= Princes Quay =

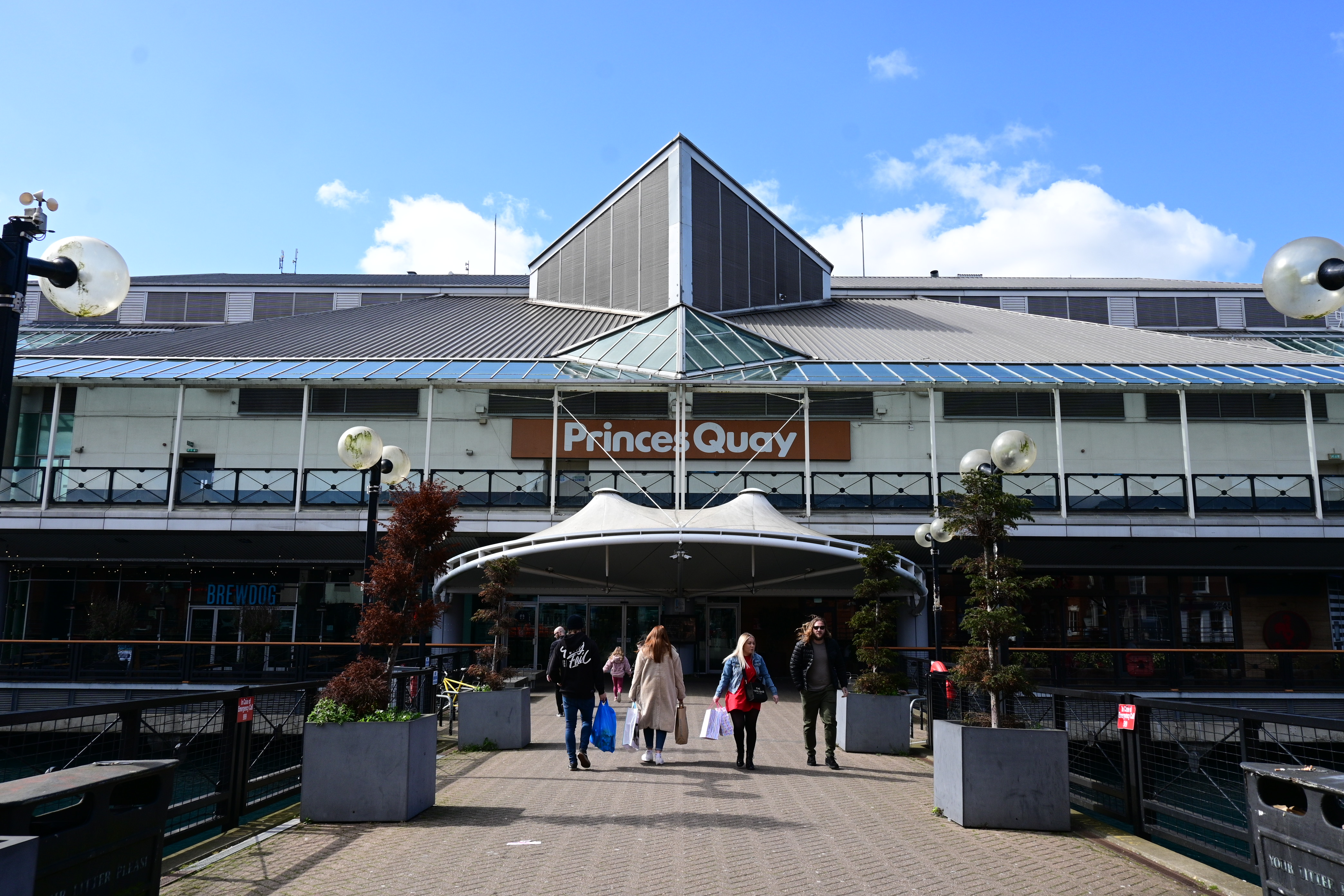
- Princes Quay Shopping Centre, Princes Quay
- Location: Kingston upon Hull, East Riding of Yorkshire, England
- Coordinates: 53.742300°N 0.338000°W
- Floors: 4
- Parking: over 920+ spaces
- Website: www.princesquay.com

Princes Quay is a shopping centre in the heart of Kingston upon Hull, East Riding of Yorkshire, England. The centre is unusual in that it is built on stilts over Prince's Dock after which it is named. It was opened in 1991.

== Description ==
To take advantage of its location the shopping centre is constructed with large windows giving visitors panoramic views of the Hull Marina and the dock. The centre also builds its image on a nautical theme, for example by calling its retail floors decks, although most shoppers still refer to them as floors.

The centre, built round a central atrium, opened to the public on 15 March 1991 and consisted of 3 decks of over 80 retail outlets. The centre includes a Food Court on the lowest deck, known as Harbour Deck. A fourth floor, known as Top Deck, was converted from retail units in 2007 into a 10-screen cinema by Vue with Europe's first digital screen.

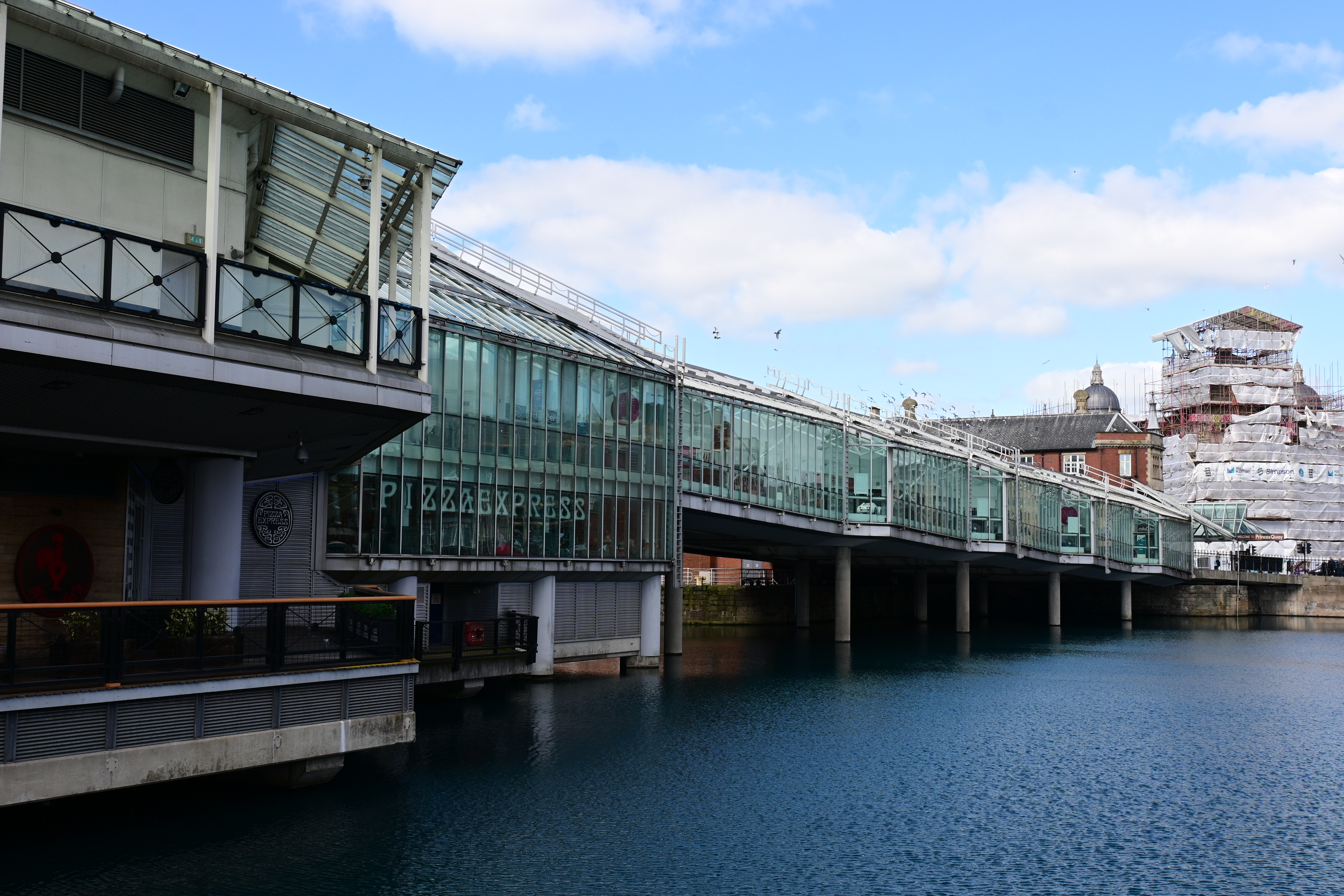
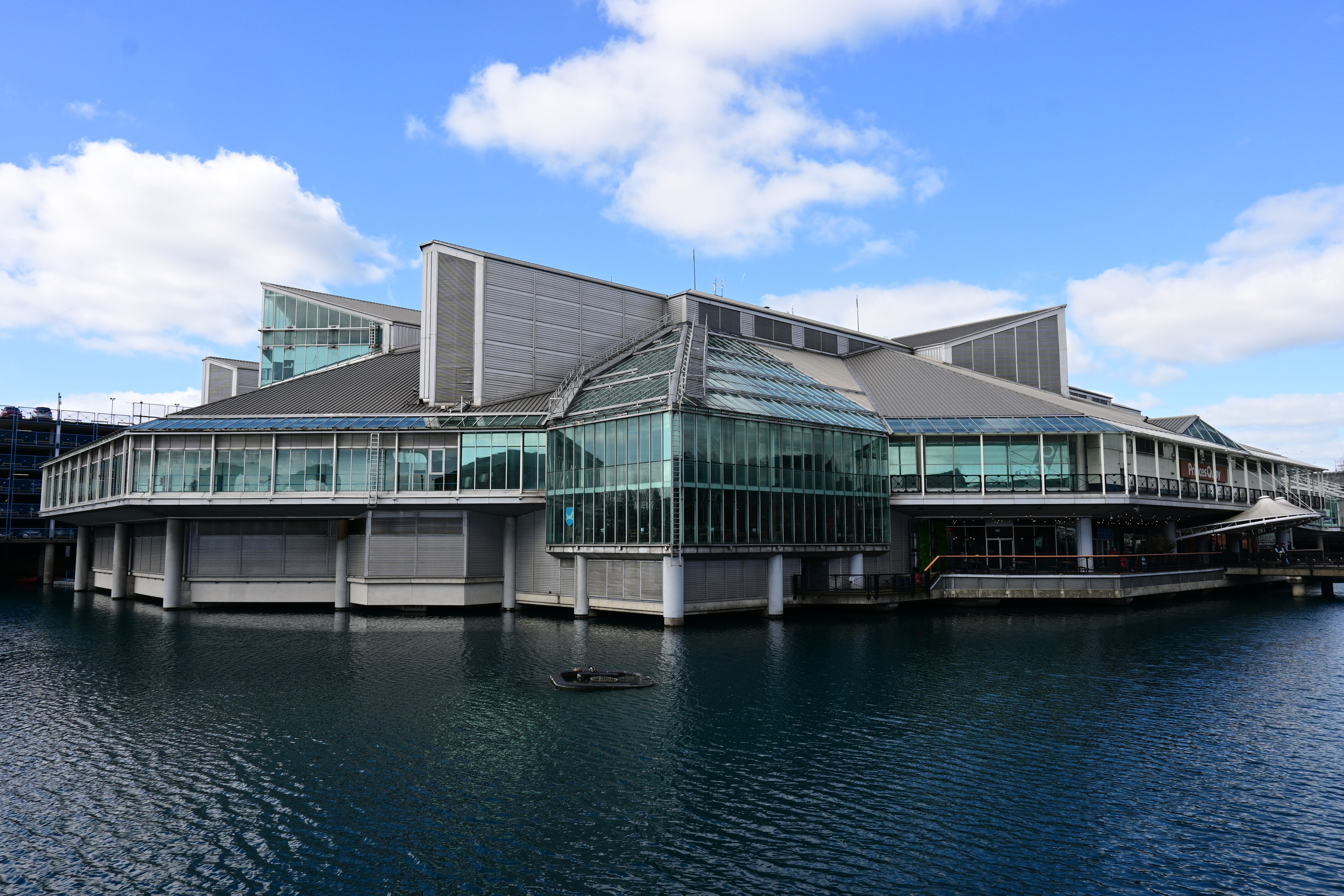
Prince's Quay Shopping Centre, built over Prince's Dock

A 1,000 place multi-storey car park is integrated with the centre and is accessed from the main A63 when travelling eastbound into the city. Princes Quay is well served by public transport with many bus routes stopping immediately outside the centre and with Hull Paragon Interchange only a few minutes' walk away. In February 2011 a plan to revamp the food court into several new casual dining restaurants, overlooking the dock commenced and has seen the return of Pizza Express to the city and has also seen Nandos open a second outlet in the city centre. The restaurants are already proving popular and add to the already increasing vibrancy of Princes Dock Street. Other major restaurant operators such as Wagamama are rumoured to be taking a place in the new food quarter.

=== Quay West expansion project ===
In December 2006, outline planning permission was granted for the western expansion of the centre. The £300 million retail development, known as Quay West, would add 500,000 sq ft (46,000 m^{2}) of shopping space, 60 shops and two department stores. It would also feature cafés and restaurants and a leisure complex comprising a health and sports club as well as a 175-bedroom hotel. The site was earmarked to open in 2011 and it was thought the development would inject an extra £42.66 million per year into the local economy. The project was cancelled in October 2010 due to a change in ownership, the economic downturn and cuts to regeneration projects.

=== Refurbishment ===
In August 2015 plans were announced to give the centre a multimillion-pound makeover. By February 2016 plans included the development of up to 28 new outlets on what has been marketed as the Outlet Deck, the ground floor food court was also to receive a facelift. By October 2016 Next was announced as the new anchor tenant for the development and that work would be starting with a completion expected for Easter 2017.

=== Trivia ===
Since 1991, the Hull International Canoe Polo tournament has been held every July on the waters surrounding the shopping centre. The tournament is organised and run by Kingston Kayak Club; a local club based at Albert Avenue Pools Complex. One of the local teams, 'Humbersiders', have always been prominent and have been crowned champions on three occasions.

== See also ==
- Tokyo Industries
