= James Oldham =

British civil engineer (1801–1890)

- Born: 23 June 1801; Kingston upon Hull, England
- Died: 10 June 1890 (aged 88)
- Occupation: Civil engineer

James Oldham (23 June 1801 – 10 June 1890) was a British civil engineer, involved in the reclamation of Sunk Island in the East Riding of Yorkshire, as well as a number of dock and other civil engineering schemes in and around Kingston upon Hull.

== Biography ==
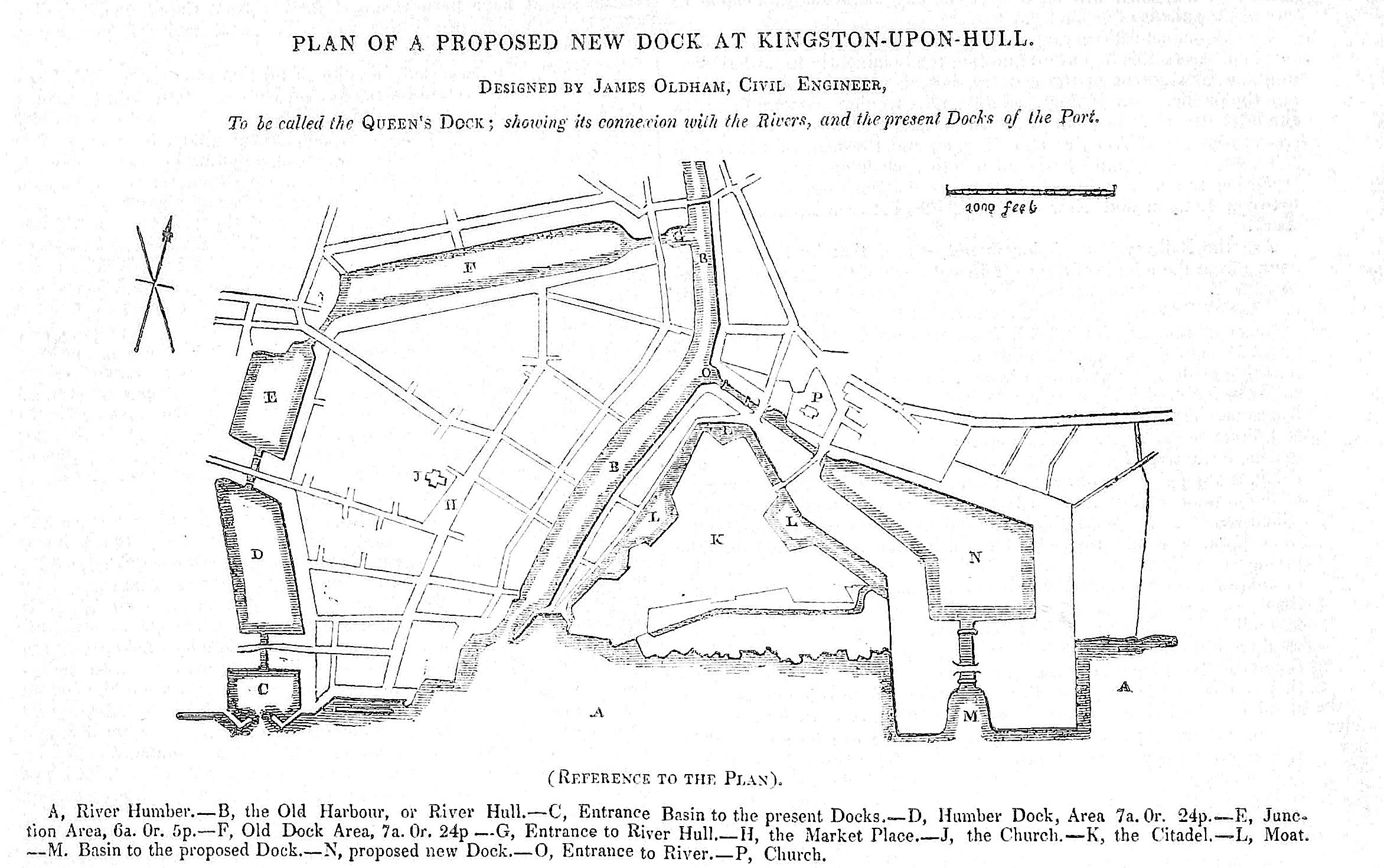
Oldham's 1838 plan for a dock in east Hull

James Oldham was born in Kingston upon Hull, England, on 23 June 1801. At the age of 14, he went to sea, spending time on ships in the Baltic; however, the life of a seaman prove too much for him and he later returned to England, and joined his father, a millwright, as apprentice, learning mechanical engineering.

One of Oldham's first contracts for was for the upgrade of the North Bridge on the River Hull in 1832, for the Hull Corporation, on which he acted as superintending engineer.

In 1835, he prepared a plan for the conversion of the Old Harbour, Hull, in 1835, a design for a West Dock for Thomas Thompson, published in 1836; and a plan for a dock in the east of Hull for the Queen's Dock Company in 1838. He also was engineer for a number of proposed railways : the Hull and Gainsborough (New Holland to Gainsborough) of 1844, the 1845 Hull and Barnsley Junction scheme, the 1866 Hull and West Yorkshire and Lancashire, and the 1884 Hull and Lincoln railway. He also was an engineer on the Hull and Leeds (1835) (Hull to Selby), and Hull and Hornsea Railways.

In 1850, he was employed by the Commissioners of Woods and Forests to reclaim the land a Sunk Island on the north bank of the Humber Estuary, and undertook surveys for reclamation of a larger area to the east of 2,000 to 3,000 acres (810 to 1,210 ha). In 1874, he entered into partnership with George Bohn; the firm acted under James Abernethy during the construction of the Alexandra Dock of the Hull and Barnsley Railway in the 1880s.

Oldhan was a founder of the Hull Mechanic's Institute, and a regular and reliable witness to Committees of the Houses of Parliament.

He died on 10 June 1890, of congestion of the lungs.

== Published works ==
- "On the Physical Features of the Humber". Report of the Twenty-Third Meeting of the British Association for the Advancement of Science. 1854. pp. 36–45.
- "On the Rise, Progress, and present Position of Steam Navigation in Hull". Report of the Twenty-Third Meeting of the British Association for the Advancement of Science. 1854. pp. 45–52.
- "Continuation of Report of the Progress of Steam Navigation in Hull". Report of the Twenty-Ninth Meeting of the British Association for the Advancement of Science. 1860. pp. 119–123.
- "On Reclaiming Land from Seas and Estuaries". Minutes of the Proceedings. 21. Institute of Civil Engineers: 454–465. 1862. doi:10.1680/imotp.1862.23406.
