= Port of Hull =

Port in Kingston upon Hull, England

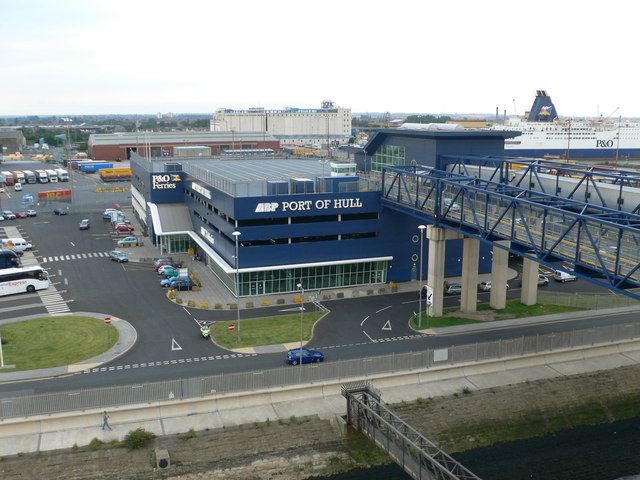
- The P&O Ferries terminal at the Port of Hull
- Interactive map of Port of Hull

Location
- Country: England
- Location: Kingston upon Hull
- Coordinates: 53.738°N 0.332°W

Details
- Operated by: Associated British Ports

The Port of Hull is a port at the confluence of the River Hull and the Humber Estuary in Kingston upon Hull, in the East Riding of Yorkshire, England.

Seaborne trade at the port can be traced to at least the 13th century, originally conducted mainly at the outfall of the River Hull, known as The Haven, or later as the Old Harbour. In 1773, the Hull Dock Company was formed and Hull's first dock built on land formerly occupied by Hull town walls. In the next half century a ring of docks was built around the Old Town on the site of the former fortifications, known as the Town Docks. The first was The Dock (1778), (or The Old Dock, known as Queen's Dock after 1855), followed by Humber Dock (1809) and Junction Dock (1829). An extension, Railway Dock (1846), was opened to serve the newly built Hull & Selby Railway.

The first dock east of the river, Victoria Dock, opened in 1850. Docks along the banks of the Humber to the west were begun in 1862 with the construction of the West Dock, later Albert Dock. The William Wright extension opened in 1880, and a dock further west, St Andrew's Dock, opened in 1883. In 1885, Alexandra Dock, a new eastern dock was built connected to a new railway line constructed by the same company, the Hull, Barnsley and West Riding Junction Railway and Dock Company. In 1914, King George Dock was built jointly by the competing railway companies, the Hull and Barnsley company and the North Eastern Railway; this was extended in 1969 by the Queen Elizabeth Dock extension. As of 2016 Alexandra is being modernised for use in wind farm construction, with a factory and estuary side quay under construction, a development known as Green Port Hull.

The Town Docks, Victoria Dock, and St Andrew's Dock fell out of use by the 1970s and were closed. Some were later infilled and redeveloped, with the Humber and Railway docks converted for leisure craft as Hull Marina.

Other facilities at the port included the Riverside Quay, built on the Humber banks at Albert Dock for passenger ferries and European trains, and the Corporation Pier, from which a Humber Ferry sailed to New Holland, Lincolnshire. Numerous industrial works were served by the River Hull, which also hosted several dry docks. To the east of Hull, Salt End near Hedon became a petroleum distribution point in the 20th century, with piers into the estuary for shipment, and later developed as a chemical works.

As of 2023, the main port is operated by Associated British Ports and is estimated to handle one million passengers per year; it is the main softwood timber importation port for the UK.

== History ==
=== Background ===
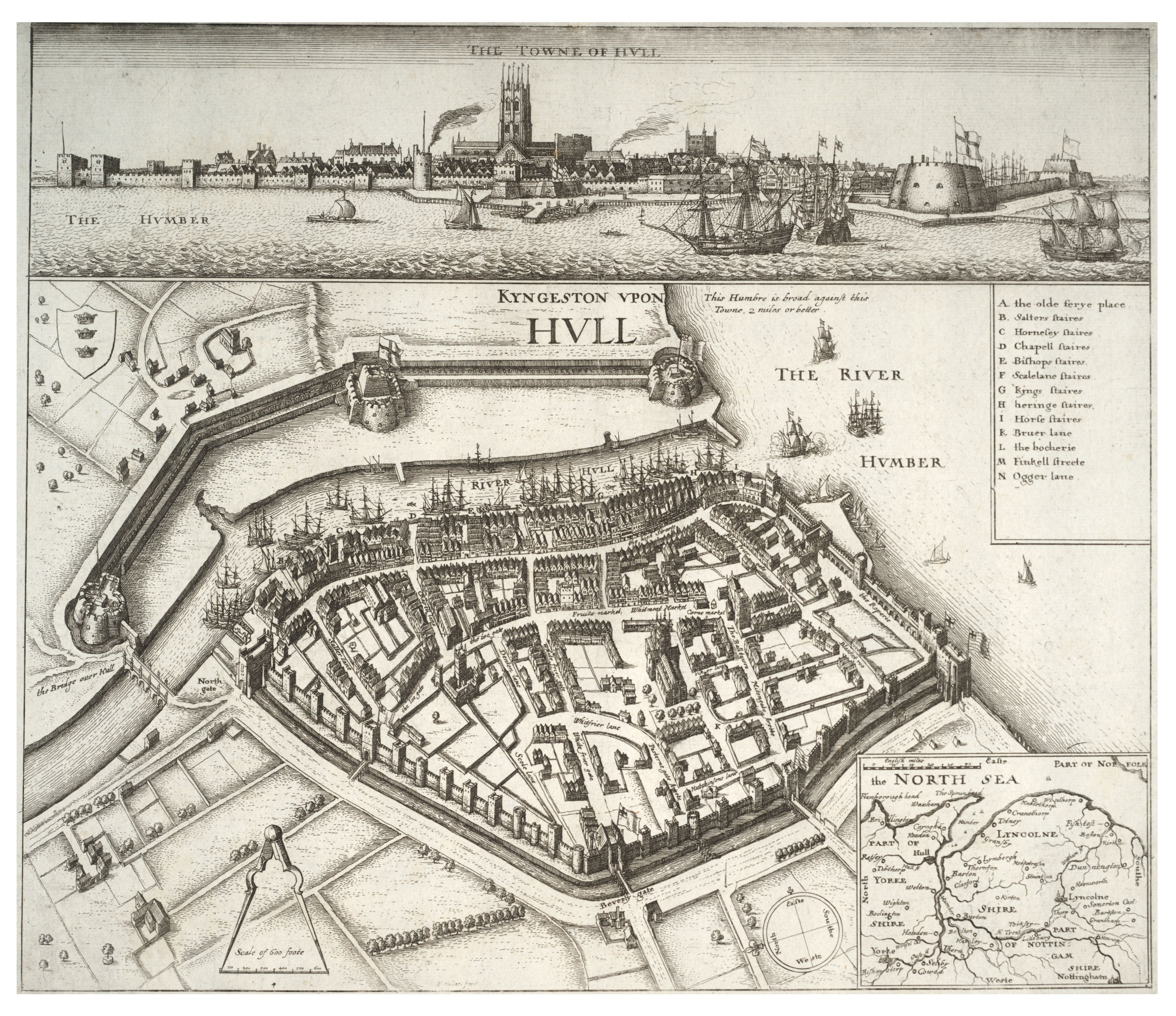
A 17th century map by Wenceslaus Hollar showing position of various staithes in the Haven and the fortifications of the City Wall.

Hull lies at a naturally advantageous position for a port on the north side of the Humber Estuary, to the west of a bend southwards giving rise to (on average) deeper water; and the River Hull flows out into the Humber at the same point. (Note: 53.738°N 0.332°W Confluence of River Hull and Humber Estuary) The initial development of a port was undertaken by wool-producing Meaux Abbey before 1200 as a route for export.

An important event in the history of Hull as a port was its acquisition by King Edward I. In 1297, it became the only port from which goods could be exported overseas from the county of Yorkshire. Thus, in the 13th and 14th centuries Hull was a major English port for the export of wool, (Note: Much of it from the North Yorkshire Moors then called Blackhower Moor, additionally wheat, corn, lead and leather were exported, and later in the 14th century also cloth.) much of it to Flanders, with wine being a major import. (Note: Also dyestuffs – Madder, Woad as well as Alum for mordant, as well as wood, iron and iron ore and a wide variety of foreign goods.) During this period the River Hull was made navigable as far as the then important town of Beverley (1269), and roads were built connecting Hull to Beverley and Holderness and to the via regia between Hessle and Beverley near to Anlaby (about 1302).

By the 15th century, trade with the Hanseatic league had become important. During the same period the growth of the English cloth industry meant that the export of cloth from Hull increased while wool exports decreased. The 16th century brought a considerable reduction in the amount of cloth traded through the port, but the export of lead increased. By the late 17th century Hull was the third port in the realm after London and Bristol, with the export of lead and cloth, and imports of flax and hemp as well as iron and tar from the Baltic.

Until 1773, trade was conducted via the Old Harbour, also known as The Haven, a series of wharves on the west bank of the River Hull, (Note: The east of the river not being developed until later) with warehouses and the merchants' houses backing on to the wharves along the High Street. (Note: The High Street still contains merchant buildings, most from a later date; Wilberforce House dates to 1660, and was once used for this purpose.)

=== Hull Dock Company ===
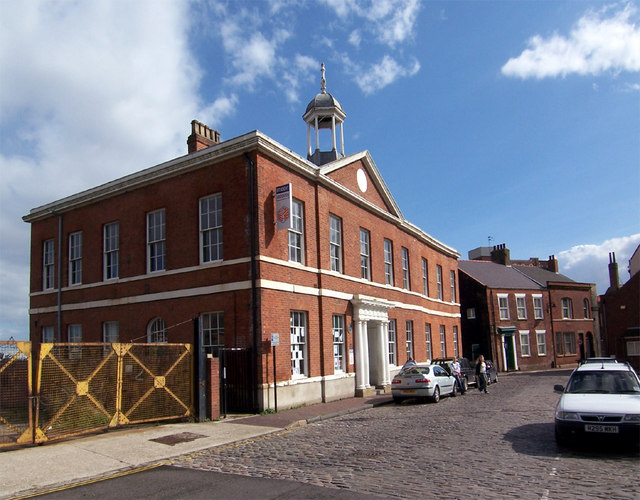
The second Hull Dock Company offices (built 1820), close to the entrance to the former Queen's Dock

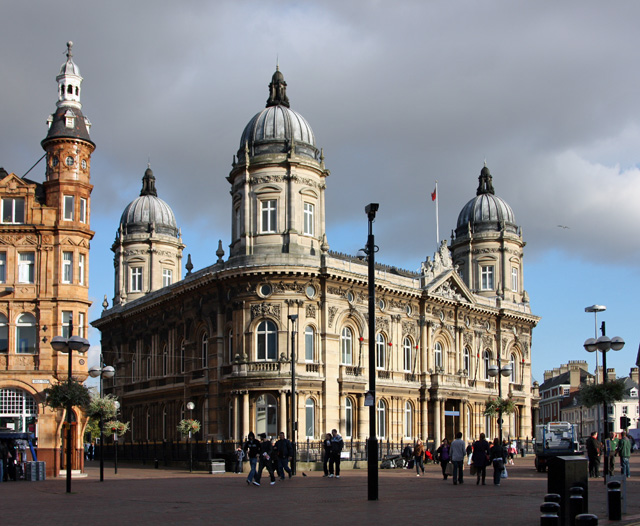
The third Hull Dock Company offices (built 1871), at the former junction between Queen's and Prince's Dock

By the 18th century it was becoming increasingly clear that the Haven was unfit for the growing amount of trade: it was not only narrow, but tidal and prone to a build up of mud from the estuary. An additional stimulus to change was the demand for a 'legal quay' on which customs officials could easily examine and weigh goods for export without causing excessive delay to shipments.

Kingston-upon-Hull Dock Act 1774
- Act of Parliament
- Parliament of Great Britain
- Long title: An Act for making and establishing publick Quays or Wharfs at Kingston upon Hull, for the better securing His Majesty's Revenues of Customs, and for the Benefit of Commerce in the Port of Kingston upon Hull; for making a Bason or Dock, with Reservoirs, Sluices, Roads, and other Works, for the Accommodation of Vessels using the said Port; and for appropriating certain Lands belonging to His Majesty, and for applying certain Sums of Money out of His Majesty's Customs at the said Port for those Purposes; and for establishing other necessary Regulations within the Town and Port of Kingston upon Hull.
- Citation: 14 Geo. 3. c. 56
- Territorial extent: Great Britain

Dates
- Royal assent: 20 May 1774
- Commencement: 13 January 1774 (Note: Start of session.)
Other legislation
Amended by	Kingston-upon-Hull Dock Act 1844; Kingston-upon-Hull Dock Act 1845; British Transport Docks Act 1967; British Transport Docks (Hull Docks) Act 1973

Status: Amended

Text of statute as originally enacted

In 1773, the Hull Corporation, Hull Trinity House and Hull merchants formed a dock company, the first statutory dock company in Britain. The Crown gave the land which contained Hull's city walls for construction of docks, and the Kingston-upon-Hull Dock Act 1774 (14 Geo. 3. c. 56) was passed allowing the dock company to raise up to £100,000 by shares and loans; thus Hull's first dock (the Old Dock) (a wet dock) began construction. Three docks, known as the Town Docks, which followed the path of the town walls, were constructed by the company between 1778 and 1829: The Old Dock, later Queen's Dock, (1778), Humber Dock (1809), and Junction Dock, later Prince's Dock, (1829). An extension of the Town Docks (Railway Dock) was built in 1846 just north of the terminus of the then recently opened Hull & Selby Railway. The first dock in Hull east of the River Hull (Victoria Dock) was constructed between 1845 and 1850; this became the main dock for timber trade and was expanded in the next two decades including the construction of large timber ponds.

In 1860, a rival company, the West Dock Company, was formed to promote and build new docks suitable for the increasing amounts of trade and the growing size of steam ships; the scheme was supported by the Hull Corporation, Hull Trinity House, the North Eastern Railway (NER) and various individuals in Hull. The site for the planned dock was on the Humber foreshore to the west of the River Hull. The Hull Dock Company then proposed a larger dock in the same position, which was sanctioned by the Hull Docks Act 1861 (24 & 25 Vict. c. lxxix) (Note: One clause of the Hull Docks Act 1861 was that the Dock Company could be converted to a municipally owned dock trust by the Hull Corporation, additionally the dividends paid by the company were restricted: the Dock Company had been created as a private "for profit" company, and was subject to widespread prejudice in the town of Hull that it better served the interests of the shareholders rather than the port itself; the shareholders were characterised as being uninterested in the development of the port.) This dock was known as the Western Dock until its opening in 1869 when it was named Albert Dock; an extension, William Wright Dock, was opened 1880. A third dock (St Andrew's Dock) on the Humber foreshore west of the William Wright Dock was opened in 1883. The three docks were ideally suited for trans-shipment by rail as they were directly south of and parallel with the Selby to Hull railway line that terminated in the centre of Hull.

North Eastern Railway (Hull Docks) Act 1893 (Note: Section 1.)
- Act of Parliament
- Parliament of the United Kingdom
- Long title: An Act for the amalgamation of the Undertaking of the Dock Company at Kingston-upon-Hull with the Undertaking of the North Eastern Railway Company and for other purposes.
- Citation: 56 & 57 Vict. c. cxcviii
- Territorial extent: United Kingdom

Dates
- Royal assent: 24 August 1893
- Commencement: 24 August 1893 (Note: The Acts of Parliament (Commencement) Act 1793.)

Status: Current legislation

Text of statute as originally enacted

In 1885, Alexandra Dock opened; it was owned and operated by the Hull, Barnsley and West Riding Junction Railway and Dock Company. This ended the dock company's monopoly on dock facilities in Hull and led to price cutting competition between the two companies for dock charges. The dock company was operating at a loss and from 1886 sought to merge the company into a larger organisation—the obvious choice being the North Eastern Railway. In 1891, the dock company approached the North Eastern for capital to improve its Albert Dock, leading to the North Eastern Railway acquiring the shares and debts of the dock company in exchange for its shares. Instead of improving Albert Dock, the North Eastern decided to expend a much greater sum on a new dock, east of Alexandra Dock; however, the proposal was opposed by both the Hull and Barnsley, and the Hull Corporation. The Hull Dock Company and NER were legally amalgamated by the North Eastern Railway (Hull Docks) Act 1893 (56 & 57 Vict. c. cxcviii); one of the clauses of the act stipulated that about £500,000 would be spent on dock improvements over the next seven years.

Clauses in the 1893 amalgamation act protecting the Hull and Barnsley company prevented the NER from creating a new deep water dock without consulting the Hull & Barnsley Railway (H&BR). This led to a joint proposal for a dock east of Alexandra Dock being submitted, and passed in the Hull Joint Dock Act 1899 (62 & 63 Vict. c. ccxlii). The new dock was opened in 1914 as the King George Dock.

=== Dock ownership (1922–) ===
The Hull and Barnsley Railway became part of the North Eastern Railway in 1922, making the docks in Hull the responsibility of a single company once again. The Railways Act 1921 led to the merger of the NER into the London and North Eastern Railway in 1923. In 1948, much of Britain's transport operations were nationalised by the Transport Act 1947 into the British Transport Commission, including the port and railway operations of the London North Eastern Railway (LNER). In 1962, the British Transport Docks Board was formed by the Transport Act 1962. In 1981, the company was privatised by the Transport Act 1981, and Associated British Ports was formed. Later that year, the docks were struck by an F0/T0 tornado on 23 November, as part of the record-breaking nationwide tornado outbreak on that day. The tornado was very weak, with damage remaining limited as a result; a second, stronger tornado struck Hull's north-eastern residential suburbs later that day.

== Docks ==
Map of the Hull docks c. 1912 (full rail network not shown)

=== The Town Docks ===
==== The Old Dock ====
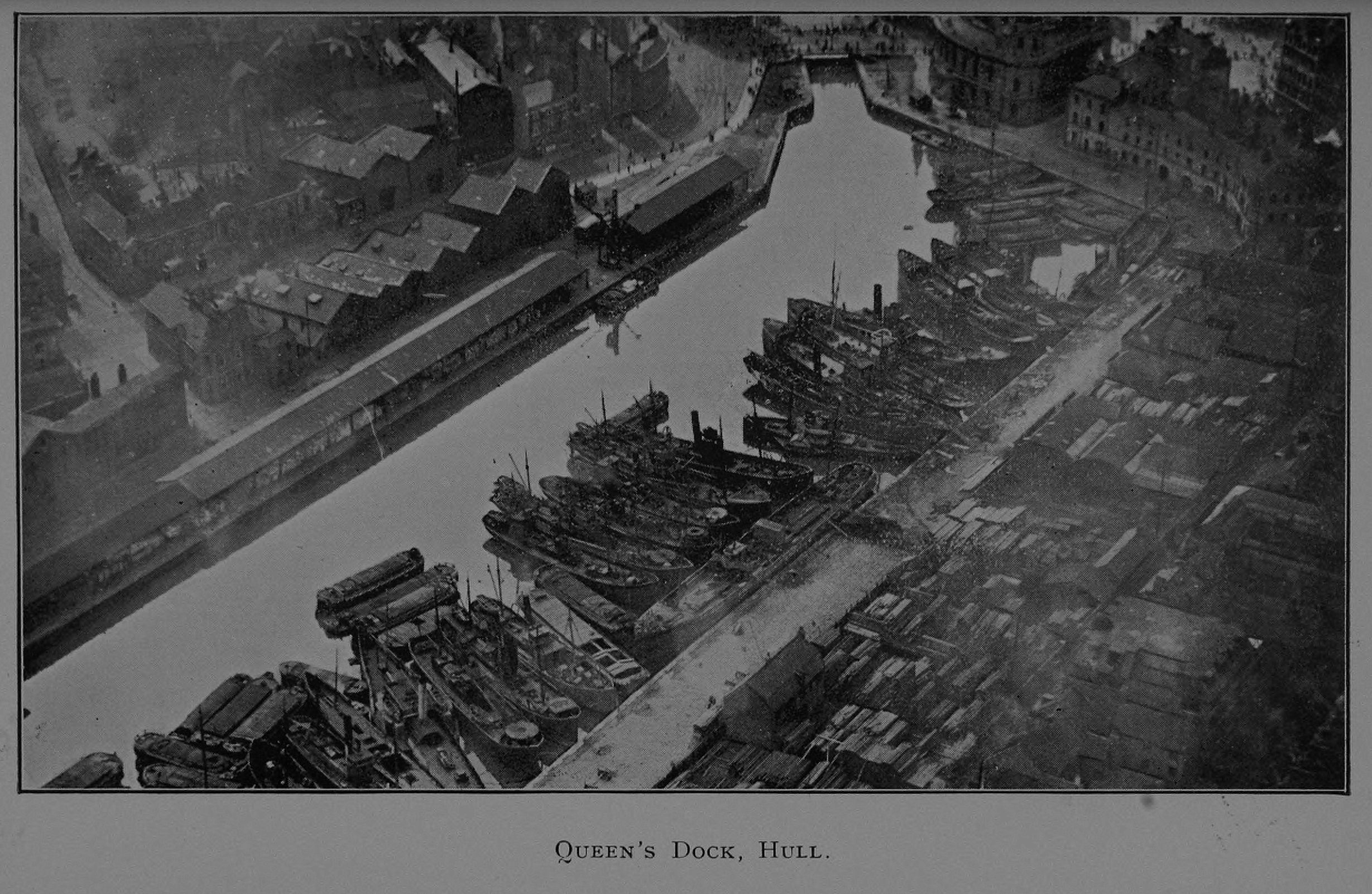
Queen's Dock, Hull in 1922

By the mid-1700s the overcrowding of ships on the River Hull, or Old Harbour, had reached such an extent that vessels were being damaged, in addition to causing delays in handling and shipping. Therefore, some tentative investigations were begun into expanding the facilities at Hull. It was not until the later 1760s that the Hull Corporation acted and employed surveyors to search for a suitable site for a new harbour. At the same time, HM Customs sought an end to the need to inspect cargoes handled at the private wharves and wanted customs procedures incorporated into a new dock or wharf—a "legal quay".

An initial survey by Robert Mylne and Joseph Robson recommended a new harbour on the east side of the River Hull. Though the established development on the east bank tended to preclude a new port there, the same interests were unwilling to see the focus of trade shift away from the west bank where they were already established. In the early 1770s, John Grundy was contracted by agriculturalists owning land reliant on the drainage of the River Hull to assess the impact of the proposed new quay on the River Hull. Grundy's report of 1772 suggested either widening the river, or using the channel behind the Hull Citadel, or the moat of the Hull town walls for both harbourage and drainage. Grundy also proposed the use of gates in the channel to afford both wet and dry docks. Reports were prepared on the cost (John Wooler) and the effect on the river (John Smeaton) of Grundy's proposal for a quay on the site of the town's moat. The dock was costed at between £55,000 and £60,000, and the quay between £11,000 and £12,000. Smeaton's report indicated no issues arising in terms of the flow of the river. After both reports had been provided in early 1773 the Corporation and Customs soon agreed to proceed with the plan. With limited opposition only on the grounds of the effect on drainage, an act for the construction was obtained in 1774.

The Old Dock, the first dock in Hull, was built between 1775 and 1778 to a design by Henry Berry and John Grundy, Jr.; Luke Holt acted as resident engineer, appointed on John Smeaton's recommendation. As built the dock was 1,703 by 254 ft (519 by 77 m) long by wide, (Note: 53.74520°N 0.33534°W Queen's Dock (Old Dock, or The Dock), now Queen's Gardens) the lock 200 by 36.5 feet (61.0 by 11.1 m) long by wide at its extremities, and 24.5 feet (7.5 m) deep, the lock river basin was 212 by 80 feet (65 by 24 m) in dimension.

The dock entrance was on the River Hull just south of North Bridge, (Note: 53.746607°N 0.32973°W Queen's Dock entrance basin, later dry dock) and the dock itself built west-south-west along the path of the North Wall as far as the Beverley Gate. (Note: The walls were demolished, but not all of the gate, which was rediscovered in the 20th century—the part occupying the gap between the constructions of Queen's and Prince's Dock.) The dock walls were of local brick, with Bramley Fall stone coping piece. Cement for the lock wall's front construction was rendered waterproof through the use of pozzolana imported from Italy. Piling for the walls consisted of piles narrowing from 12 by 9 inches (300 by 230 mm) to 3 inches (76 mm) at the bottom supporting sleepers 12 by 6 inches (300 by 150 mm) wide by deep trenailed to the piles. The alluvium excavated during the dock construction was deposited mostly on land to the north, raising the ground by 5 feet (1.5 m)—the land was later sold for building upon.

Some of the work proved inadequate, requiring reconstruction later. Issues with weak ground led to displacement bulging of the dock's walls in 1776 before the dock had been completed. Both Holt and Berry had recommended extra piling at the softer ground areas but had been over-ruled. Subsequent movement of the walls proved additional piling was necessary. By 1778 some parts of the dock walls were displaced from their proper position by 3 feet (0.9 m), exacerbated by poor wall design and its buttresses. Further issues occurred on the lock to the River Hull, and the north wall of the lock basin collapsed before construction had been completed. Despite these setbacks the dock was formally opened on 22 September 1778. The lock required rebuilding in the 1780s to prevent total collapse, and in 1814 the lock and basin were rebuilt under the guidance of John Rennie the Elder with George Miller as resident engineer.

The lock was rebuilt of brick with pozzuolana mortar, faced with Bramley Fall stone. After rebuilding the lock was 120.75 by 38 feet (36.80 by 11.58 m) long by wide, with 24.5 feet (7.5 m) height above the sills; the depth of water being between 15 and 20 ft (4.6 and 6.1 m) depending on the tide. At the entrance to the dock a double drawbridge of the Dutch type, counterbalanced for ease of use, allowed people to cross the lock. The main part of the bridge was cast iron, built by Ayden and Etwell of the Shelf Iron Works (Bradford). The lock basin was rebuilt at the same time, to the same design as used in the new Humber Dock—the new basin was 213 feet (65 m) long, narrowing from 80.5 to 71 feet (24.5 to 21.6 m) wide from top to bottom. Both the lock and the basin were re-opened on 13 November 1815.

The dock was called The Dock until the construction of further docks, when it was called The Old Dock. It was officially named the Queen's Dock in 1855. (Note: The docks were renamed in honour of the visit to Hull in 1854 by Queen Victoria and (Prince Albert), during which the Royal Party toured the docks on the steam-yacht "Fairy".) (Note: The "Queen's Dock" proposal of 1838, forerunner of the Victoria Dock, should not be confused with the original Hull Dock of 1778, named "Queen's Dock" in 1854.)

The dock closed in 1930 and was sold to the corporation for £100,000. It was subsequently infilled and converted to ornamental gardens known as Queen's Gardens.

==== Humber Dock ====
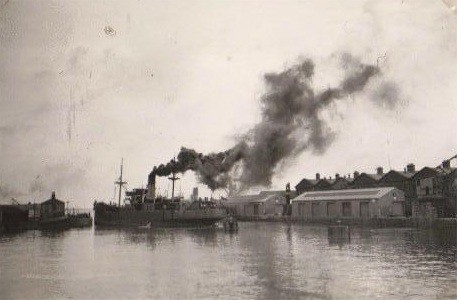
Humber Dock in 1952

Since the entrance to the Old Dock was via the River Hull, there were still problems with ships accessing the dock through the crowded river. In 1781, a canal was proposed to connect the Old Dock to the Humber. In general, sea-borne trade was still growing. Customs commissioned three independent reports from Thomas Morris, William Jessop, and Joseph Huddart on the siting of a second dock in 1793. All three considered a dock in the southern end of the ditch of the city walls, and a dock on the site of Hull Citadel, also known as the Garrison. Two reports recommended the new dock be sited in the town ditch and proposed a canal connecting the old and new dock. The dock company then commissioned John Hudson and John Longbotham to examine and cost a dock in the town ditch, as well as other improvements. There was some delay in making the new dock a reality, partly due to the lethargy of the dock company, but the Kingston-upon-Hull Dock Act 1802 was passed in Parliament for the construction of a second dock—again following the path of the City walls, this time from Hessle gate roughly northwards.

John Rennie and William Chapman were employed as engineers. They submitted an optimistic cost estimate for a dock in the town ditch with a basin onto the Humber of £84,000. Experience with the settlement and collapse of the old dock's walls led to more substantial construction of lock and dock walls, though some subsidence still occurred. The dock walls now stood on angled piled foundations, with the mass of the wall at a shallow angle to the vertical opposing the weight of earth behind. The lock base consisted of an inverted arch, a design also used on the rebuilt Old Dock lock of 1814. During the construction of the lock pit a freshwater spring was found, (Note: Underground streams forcing up through sand, with an origin in the aquifers of the Yorkshire Wolds. (See also Artesian well)) causing difficulties in construction. The spring continued to cause problems in the lock pit, with some subsidence attributed to it (1812); James Walker directed further remedial work on the lock in 1830 as a result.

John Harrap was the on site engineer. Construction began in 1803 and was completed in 1809 at a cost of £220,000. Mud from the excavations was used to make new ground on the banks of the Humber, with the upper clay stratum also used to manufacture bricks for the works. (Note: The land made was in the area of the Victoria Pier, south-east of the dock, creating Nelson Street, and to the south and west of the dock, creating Wellington Street.)

The dock entrance was from the Humber via an outer basin with piers. (Note: 53.73779°N 0.335927°W Humber Dock entrance basin) The dock itself was 914 ft (279 m) long and 342 ft (104 m) wide, the lock was 158 ft (48 m) long and 42 ft (13 m) wide. The depth of water varied from 21 to 26 ft (6.4 to 7.9 m) seasonally depending on the tides. (Note: 53.739636°N 0.337549°W Humber Dock (now part of Hull Marina)) The lock was crossed by a two leaf swing bridge, 81 feet 9 inches (24.92 m) in total length, and 8 feet 3 inches (2.51 m) wide, made of cast iron, by Ayden and Etwell, with six main ribs supporting the roadway.

The dock was first filled with water on 3 December 1808 and was formally opened on 30 June 1809. The cost of construction was split between the Dock Company, the Hull Corporation and Hull Trinity House, as set out in the text of the Kingston-upon-Hull Dock Act 1802.

Humber Dock closed in 1968, it re-opened in 1983 as the Hull Marina. The dock, lock and swing bridge over the lock (a replacement dated 1846), are now listed structures. The swing bridge (Wellington Street Bridge) was restored in 2007.

==== Junction Dock ====
Kingston-upon-Hull Dock Act 1802
- Act of Parliament
- Parliament of the United Kingdom
- Long title: An Act for amending an Act, passed in the Fourteenth Year of the Reign of His present Majesty, intituled "An Act for making and establishing public Quays or Wharf's at Kingston-upon-Hull, for the better securing His Majesty's Revenues of Customs, and for the Benefit of Commerce in the Port of Kingston-upon-Hull; for making a Bason or Dock, with Reservoirs, Sluices, Roads, and other Works, for the Accommodation of Vessels using the said Port; and for appropriating certain Lands belonging to His Majesty, and for applying certain Sums of Money out of His Majesty's Customs at the said Port, for those Purposes; and for establishing other necessary Regulations within the Town and Port of Kingston-upon-Hull;" and also for making additional Basons or Docks at Kingston-upon-Hull, with an Entrance into the same from the River Humber; and for granting certain Lands belonging to His Majesty in Aid of the said Works.
- Citation: 42 Geo. 3. c. xci
- Territorial extent: United Kingdom

Dates
- Royal assent: 22 June 1802
- Commencement: 1 January 1803
Other legislation
Amends	Kingston-upon-Hull Dock Act 1774
Amended by	Kingston-upon-Hull Dock Act 1824; Kingston-upon-Hull Dock Act 1844; Hull Docks Act 1861; British Transport Docks Act 1967; British Transport Docks Act 1973

Status: Amended

Text of statute as originally enacted

Kingston-upon-Hull Dock Act 1805
- Act of Parliament
- Parliament of the United Kingdom
- Long title: An Act for raising a further Sum of Money for carrying into Execution an Act, passed in the Forty second Year of the Reign of His present Majesty, for making additional Basons or Docks at Kingston upon Hull.
- Citation: 45 Geo. 3. c. xlii
- Territorial extent: United Kingdom

Dates
- Royal assent: 5 June 1805
- Commencement: 5 June 1805
Other legislation
Amended by	Kingston-upon-Hull Dock Act 1844; Hull Docks Act 1861; British Transport Docks Act 1973
Relates to	Kingston-upon-Hull Dock Act 1802

Status: Amended

Text of statute as originally enacted

Kingston-upon-Hull Dock Act 1824
- Act of Parliament
- Parliament of the United Kingdom
- Long title: An Act to amend so much of an Act of the Forty second Year of His late Majesty, for making additional Basons or Docks at Kingston upon Hull, as relates to certain Lands belonging to His Majesty.
- Citation: 5 Geo. 4. c. 52
- Territorial extent: United Kingdom

Dates
- Royal assent: 3 June 1824
- Commencement: 3 June 1824
Other legislation
Amends	Kingston-upon-Hull Dock Act 1802

Status: Current legislation

Text of statute as originally enacted

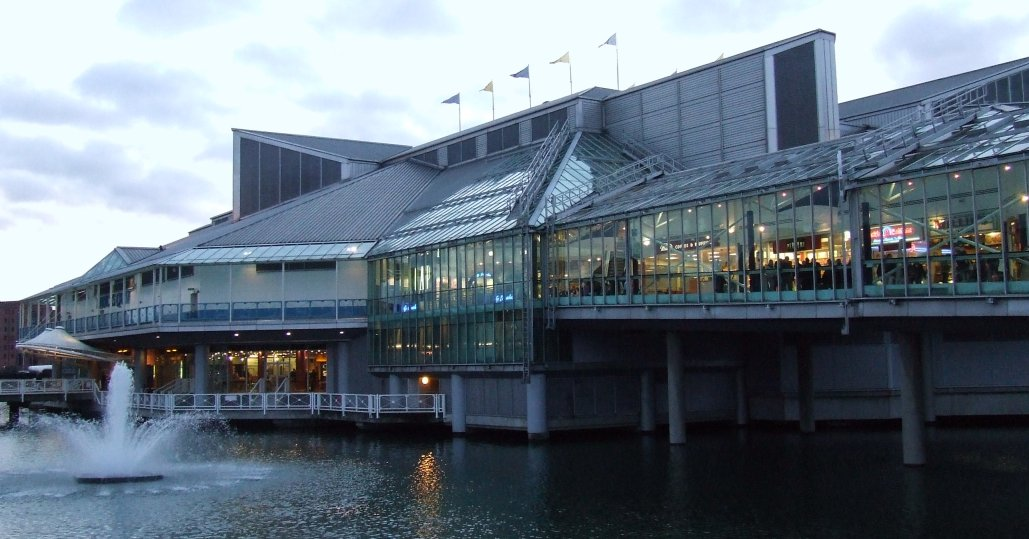
The Princes Quay shopping centre on the Junction Dock

One stipulation of the Kingston-upon-Hull Dock Act 1802 (42 Geo. 3. c. xci) for the construction of Humber Dock was that the Hull Dock Company would build a third dock between the Old and Humber docks when the average tonnage of goods unloaded at the docks reached a certain level. This condition was satisfied in 1825. The required act of Parliament had already been passed – the Kingston-upon-Hull Dock Act 1824 (5 Geo. 4. c. 52) – and construction of the third dock began in 1826.

This dock, Junction Dock, was constructed between, and connected to the Old and Humber Docks. (Note: 53.742176°N 0.338550°W Junction Dock, later Prince's Dock, now the site of the Princes Quay shopping centre) This made the old town of Hull an island bounded by the three docks, a river and an estuary, and built roughly along the lines of the old fortifications between Beverley and Myton gates, as set out in the 1802 act.

It was designed by James Walker with Thomas Thorton and later John Timperley as resident engineer. The construction cost £186,000. (Note: £165,000 in Baldwin 1973, p. 9) The dock walls were similar in design to those of Humber Dock, as were the locks, with inverted, arched bottoms. While the cofferdam used in the construction of the northern lock was being dismantled a leak caused the undermining and collapse of around 60 feet (18 m) of the Old dock wall; the removal of debris was done using a diving bell, and the wall repaired with piling.

The dock opened in 1829 and was 645 ft (197 m) long and 407 ft (124 m) wide, with a lock at each end 36 ft (11 m) wide with a bridge over each. The bridges were of the balanced lifting type; both bridges and locks were from Hunter and English (Bow, London), with iron from Alfreton, Derbyshire. In 1855, it was renamed Prince's Dock in honour of a visit by Queen Victoria and Albert, Prince Consort.

The dock closed in 1968. Part of the dock still exists but without a lock connection to Humber Dock. The Princes Quay shopping centre, opened in 1991, was built over part of the dock on stilts. The dock now features a fountain.

==== Railway Dock ====
Kingston-upon-Hull Dock Act 1844
- Act of Parliament
- Parliament of the United Kingdom
- Long title: An Act for making new Docks, and other Works connected therewith, in addition to the present Docks at Kingston-upon-Hull; and for amending the Acts relating to such last-mentioned Docks.
- Citation: 7 & 8 Vict. c. ciii
- Territorial extent: United Kingdom

Dates
- Royal assent: 6 August 1844
- Commencement: 6 August 1844
Other legislation
Amends	Kingston-upon-Hull Dock Act 1802; Kingston-upon-Hull Dock Act 1805
Amended by	Kingston-upon-Hull Dock Act 1845; Kingston-upon-Hull Dock Amendment Act 1854; Hull Docks Act 1861; Hull Docks Act 1883; North Eastern Railway (Hull Docks) Act 1893; British Transport Docks Act 1964; British Transport Docks Act 1967; British Transport Docks Act 1969; British Transport Docks Act 1973

Status: Amended

Kingston-upon-Hull Dock Act 1845
- Act of Parliament
- Parliament of the United Kingdom
- Long title: An Act for amending the Acts relating to the Docks at Kingston-upon-Hull, and for enlarging one of the said Docks
- Citation: 8 & 9 Vict. c. v
- Territorial extent: United Kingdom

Dates
- Royal assent: 8 May 1845
- Commencement: 8 May 1845
Other legislation
Amends	Kingston-upon-Hull Dock Act 1844
Amended by	British Transport Docks Act 1967; British Transport Docks (Hull Docks) Act 1973

Status: Amended

The Dock Company applied to build a new branch dock in May 1844, and obtained powers with the Kingston-upon-Hull Dock Act 1844 (7 & 8 Vict. c. ciii), which also enabled the construction of an east dock (later Victoria Dock). In late 1844, the company applied to expand the branch dock, which was enabled by the Kingston-upon-Hull Dock Act 1845 (8 & 9 Vict. c. v).

The Railway Dock was connected on the west side of the Humber Dock to the north of Kingston Street and was smaller than the other town docks. The dock of 13,130 sq ft (1,220 m^{2}), (Note: 53.739712°N 0.340856°W Railway Dock now part of Hull Marina) approximately 716 by 165 feet (218 by 50 m) was constructed at a cost of £106,000. It opened on 3 December 1846. The Dock Company's engineer was J. B. Hartley, also the engineer on the east dock.

Its primary purpose was for the transfer of goods to and from the newly built Hull and Selby Railway, which had its passenger terminus just west of Humber Dock facing onto Railway Street, and its goods sheds north of this (see Manor House Street railway station). Railway lines also ran from the goods shed to the Humber Dock.

Like Humber Dock, the dock closed in 1968 and in 1984 became part of Hull Marina.

=== Victoria Dock ===
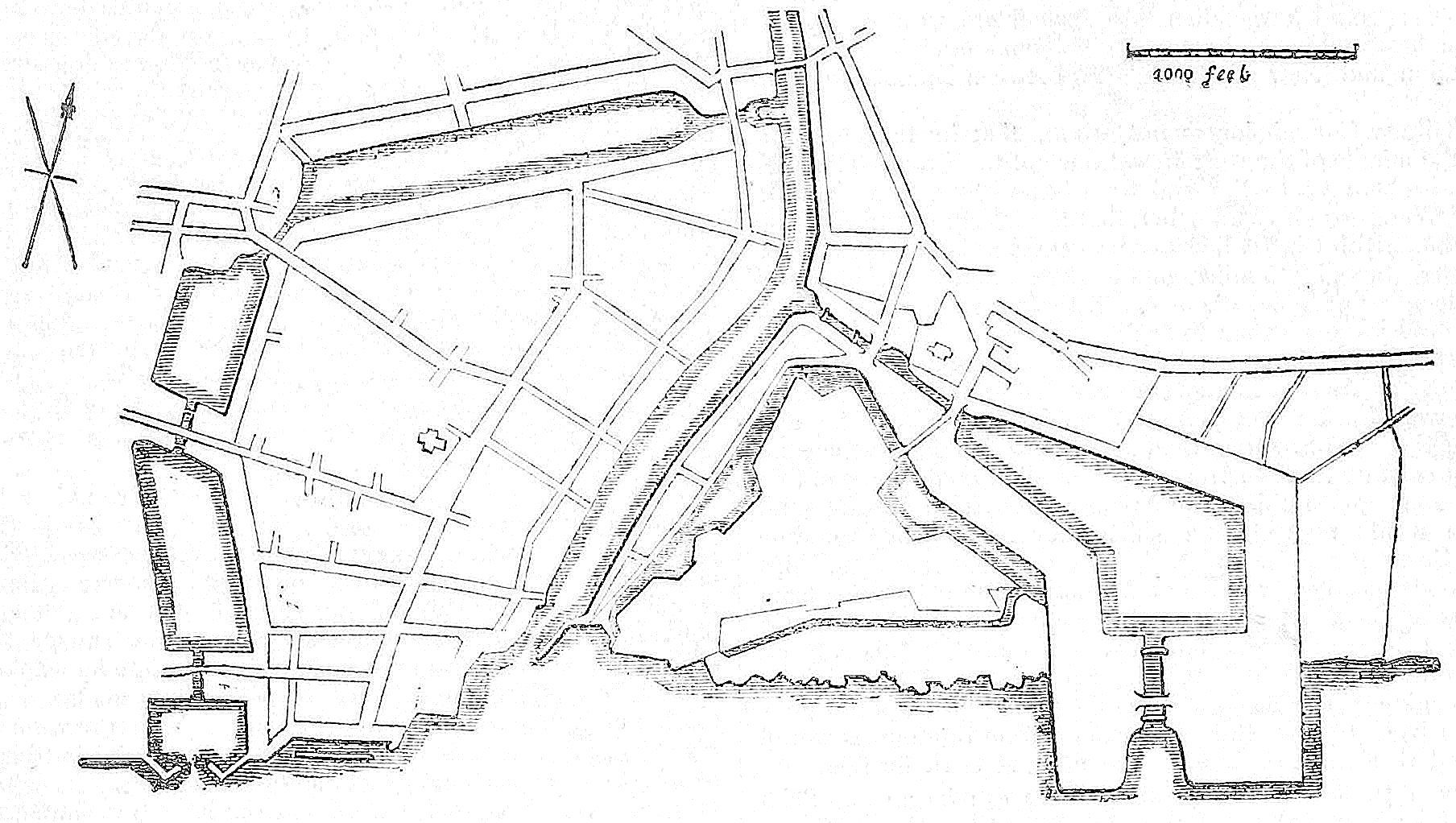
Plan of the town docks with proposed Queen's Dock to the east (1839)

After the construction of Junction Dock in 1825, the port and its trade continued to grow substantially, leading to the requirement for a new dock. In 1838, an independent company, the Queen's Dock Company, was formed to promote a new dock. The new dock, of around 12 acres (4.9 ha), to be called the Queen's Dock, was designed by James Oldham for a site of around 30 acres (12 ha) in Drypool east of the River Hull and The Citadel and near the river's confluence with the Humber. The proposed dock had entrances onto the Humber and the Hull. Capital of £180,000 was proposed for the scheme. Proceedings for a bill in Parliament were begun in 1838. (Note: See footnote in Bethell (1841, p. 27) quote "The London Gazette of 16 November, containing the notice for a bill to make the Queen's Dock, was put in.")

The Queen's Dock Company abandoned the project, after the dock company took up a similar proposal. In September 1839 James Walker was asked to design plans for a dock, and proceedings for a bill in Parliament were begun at the end of that year. The dock's main aim was to accommodate the increased timber trade, freeing up the town docks; alternative plans were also considered including a west dock, and the conversion of the Old Harbour (River Hull) into a dock. Walker's dock was broadly similar to the built dock, (Note: Walker's 1840 dock was 14 acres (5.7 ha) in area with a quay area of around 21 acres (8.5 ha). The water depths were 23 to 17 feet (7.0 to 5.2 m) (high to low tides) in 9 acres (3.6 ha) of the dock nearer to the Humber lock, with the remainder of the dock shallower with depths of 20 to 14 feet (6.1 to 4.3 m). His cost estimate was £300,000. The dock was to have a 5 acres (2.0 ha) entrance basin on the Humber, and a lock suitable for the largest paddle steamers of the day, 210 by 60 feet (64 by 18 m), and a 36 feet (11 m) wide passage onto the Old Harbour.) with entrances onto both the Humber and the River Hull. (Note: Wright (1875, p. 87) states that "it was originally intended to construct this dock [...] with an entrance from the Humber only ...", however the original notice in The London Gazette of 1839 describes a link to the Old Harbour, as do the Minutes of the June 1840 parliamentary committee examining the bill. The link to the River Hull for the built dock was not constructed until the early 1850s.) The design allowed for an extension to the east with timber ponds at a later date.

The 1840 bill was withdrawn due to local opposition. In 1844, the company returned again to Parliament with a bill for a dock in the same location, as well as other works including the Railway Dock. Permission to build the new east dock, and railway dock was granted in the Kingston-upon-Hull Dock Act 1844 (7 & 8 Vict. c. ciii); construction of this new dock began in 1845 and was completed in 1850 at a cost of £300,000. The dock company's engineer for this project was J. B. Hartley; the plan was similar in overall form to that of James Walker's design. The formal laying of the foundation stone took place on 5 November 1845, and the formal opening on 3 July 1850, with the dock given the name Victoria Dock, in honour of Queen Victoria.

The dock had an area of about 12.83 acres (5.19 ha), with the Half Tide Basin 3 acres (1.2 ha), the outer basin onto the Humber 2.75 acres (1.11 ha), and the Drypool Basin 1.125 acres (0.455 ha). (Note: Dock: 12 acres 3 rods 13 perch; Half Tide Basin: 3 acres; Victoria Dock Basin: 2 acres 3 rods; and the Drypool Basin 1 acre 20 perch. Sheahan (1864, p. 293)) In some respects the dock was of a slightly larger design than Walker's 1840 proposal. The water depth was 27.5 to 22 feet (8.4 to 6.7 m) (spring to neap tide), and the entrances to the Humber and the Hull River were 60 and 45 feet (18 and 14 m) wide respectively. There were two entrances. The larger entrance was onto the Humber. From an outer basin it led via two parallel locks to the Half Tide Basin, (Note: One lock was narrower and intended for barges.) (Note: 53.741926°N 0.319263°W Half Tide Basin, Victoria Dock) and then to the dock itself. (Note: 53.743732°N 0.320027°W Victoria Dock, defunct) The second entrance was onto the River Hull south of the entrance to the Old Dock and of Drypool Bridge; it had an outer lock which opened directly to a second locked area known as Drypool Basin. (Note: The Drypool Basin and connection to the River Hull was completed in the early 1850s; the entrance on the River Hull had not been sanctioned at the time of the formal opening (1850), it was completed soon after, being under construction by 1852.) (Note: 53.744117°N 0.325200°W Drypool Basin, Victoria Dock (defunct)) The first timber pond was added soon after the construction of the dock.

In 1845, the York, Hull and East and West Yorkshire Junction Railway proposed a railway line from York to Hull which was to terminate at the East Dock. As a consequence, the York and North Midland Railway (Y&NMR) was forced to bring forward its own scheme to connect the east dock to the railway network. The Y&NMR's Victoria Dock Branch Line was opened in 1853.

In 1863, the dock itself was expanded eastwards by 8 acres (3.2 ha), plus another timber pond (No. 2) of 12 acres (4.9 ha) east of the dock. The original timber pond (No. 1) east of the Half Tide Basin was extended through land reclaimed from the Humber. In 1875, the extent of the two ponds was 14 and 8 acres (5.7 and 3.2 ha) respectively.

The western boundary of the dock was defined by the Hull Citadel, which was sold to the Dock company and demolished in 1864. The site was then used for timber storage. Part of the former Citadel land was used by Martin Samuelson and Company (later Humber Iron Works) for shipbuilding, and later by Cook, Welton & Gemmell (from 1883 to 1902). C. & W. Earle also had shipbuilding facilities (established 1851) on the banks of the Humber adjacent to and south of Victoria Dock.

Part of the north-west corner of the eastern timber pond (No. 2) was filled in c. 1900 because of changes to the railway layout north of the dock. In the late 1930s, the London and North Eastern Railway (LNER) closed the entrance to No. 2 pond and partially filled in its south side, and expanded timber storage and sidings for the dock to the east over the site of the former shipyard of Earle's Shipbuilding, as part of wider improvements to rail connected timber handling facilities at the dock.

By the second half of the 20th century, both ponds had been filled in creating timber yards and sidings; this pattern of use was retained until closure. One major use of the dock was for the trade in timber. There were also facilities for cattle imports including abattoirs and cold storage; coal was also exported through the dock.

The Dock closed in the 1970s and was infilled. The land was used for the construction of a housing estate in the late 1980s. The entrance basin to the dock on the Humber part remains though it is permanently sealed.

=== The West Dock ===
==== Albert Dock ====
Hull Docks Act 1861
- Act of Parliament
- Parliament of the United Kingdom
- Long title: An Act for authorizing the Dock Company at Kingston-upon-Hull to make and maintain an additional Dock at Kingston-upon-Hull (to be called the Western Dock), and a Railway to connect the same with the Hull and Selby Railway; to alter a Part of the Line of the Hull and Selby Railway, and to construct other Works at Kingston-upon-Hull; for amending the Acts relating to the Company; for granting more effectual Powers for the Regulation and Management of their Docks; and for other Purposes.
- Citation: 24 & 25 Vict. c. lxxix
- Territorial extent: United Kingdom

Dates
- Royal assent: 28 June 1861
- Repealed: 28 June 1861
Other legislation
Amends	Kingston-upon-Hull Dock Act 1802; Kingston-upon-Hull Dock Act 1805; Kingston-upon-Hull Dock Act 1844
Amended by	Hull Docks Act 1866; Humber Conservancy Act 1868; Hull Docks Act 1877; Hull Docks Act 1883; North Eastern Railway (Hull Docks) Act 1893; Humber Conservancy Act 1907; North Eastern Railway Act 1911; British Transport Docks Act 1967; British Transport Docks Act 1969; British Transport Docks (Hull Docks) Act 1973; British Transport Docks Act 1974

Status: Amended

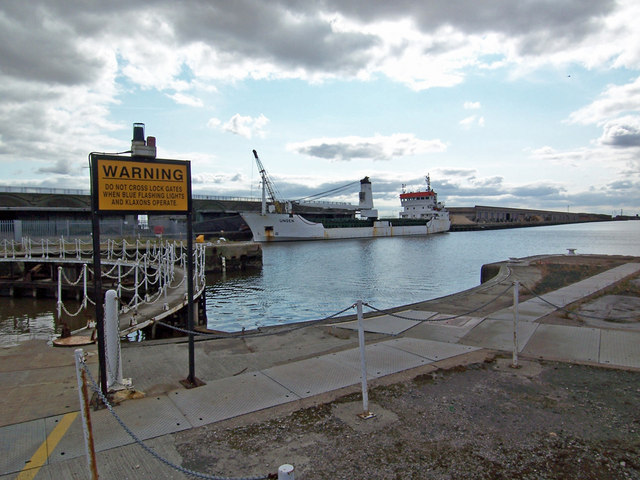
The modern Albert Dock (2007)

Alderman Thomas Thompson had promoted a dock along the banks of the Humber in West Hull as early as the 1830s. In 1860, the West Dock Company was formed to promote a dock in this location, backed by the Hull Corporation, North Eastern Railway, the Hull Trinity House and leading Hull figures. The company proposed a dock of around 1,000 yards (910 m) long and of 14 acres (5.7 ha) in area. In response, the Hull Dock Company promoted a rival scheme; both were put to Parliament and the Hull Dock Company obtained the Hull Docks Act 1861 (24 & 25 Vict. c. lxxix). (Note: See: the 1860 West Dock Company notice in The London Gazette, and the 1860 Hull Dock Company notice in The London Gazette.)

Hull Docks Act 1866
- Act of Parliament
- Parliament of the United Kingdom
- Long title: An Act to authorize the Dock Company at Kingston-upon-Hull to enlarge the Western Dock, and to raise further Sums of Money; to extend the Time for the Completion of the Works; and for other Purposes.
- Citation: 29 & 30 Vict. c. lxxvii
- Territorial extent: United Kingdom

Dates
- Royal assent: 11 June 1866
- Commencement: 11 June 1866
Other legislation
Amends	Hull Docks Act 1861
Amended by	Hull Docks Act 1883; British Transport Docks Act 1973; British Transport Docks Act 1974

Status: Amended

Hull Docks Act 1867
- Act of Parliament
- Parliament of the United Kingdom
- Long title: An Act to authorize the Dock Company at Kingston-upon-Hull further to enlarge the Works connected with the Western Dock; and to acquire additional Lands in connexion with such Dock; and for other Purposes.
- Citation: 30 & 31 Vict. c. xxv
- Territorial extent: United Kingdom

Dates
- Royal assent: 31 May 1867
- Commencement: 31 May 1867
Other legislation
Amended by	British Transport Docks Act 1973; British Transport Docks Act 1974

Status: Amended

Text of statute as originally enacted

The Hull Docks Act 1861 sanctioned the building of a new dock on the Humber foreshore. While the dock was under construction two further acts were enacted: the Hull Docks Act 1866 (29 & 30 Vict. c. lxxvii) allowed the extension of the dock westwards, and the Hull Docks Act 1867 (30 & 31 Vict. c. xxv) allowed further expansion to the west and south. (Note: The 1865 and 1866 notices in The London Gazette: "Hull Docks. (Enlargement of Western Dock and Works ..." The London Gazette (23042): 5714. 24 November 1865.; "Hull Docks; Enlargement and Extension of Works in connection with the Western Dock ..." The London Gazette (23189): 6358–6359. 23 November 1866.)The dock sanctioned in 1861 was to be 2,500 feet (760 m) long, the 1866 act increased the length to 3,350 feet (1,020 m) and the enclosed area to 22.8 acres (9.2 ha), and water depth of 29 to 24.5 feet (8.8 to 7.5 m) from high spring to neap tides. The total land area including locks, basins and reclaimed land to the west was 76 acres (31 ha). The engineer was John Hawkshaw; the site engineer was J. C. Hawkshaw.

Construction began in October 1862, with the foundation stone of the north dock wall laid by William Wright in May 1864. The southern dock walls and quays were on reclaimed land, and cofferdams were built which enclosed and split the works into three parts. Quay walls were built of sand and lime mortar with stone from Horsforth onto concrete foundations of on average 10 feet (3.0 m) thick laid on a clay strata reached by excavating down through clay and sand. During construction, on 17 September 1866 one of the south dock walls burst allowing the Humber to flood in. The breach was repaired by 13 October. During the construction of the lockpit the excavation work were troubled by "boils", which undermined the work. Boils caused a breach in the river bank on 17 September 1866, letting water into the works. In November, construction began on a dam of around 380 feet (120 m) in length from the south wall to the bank near the Humber Dock to protect the works. Boils appeared in the lockpit on 3 March 1867, and required extensive specialised remedial work to finish the foundations, taking until 20 November for the flow from the boils to be dealt with. Due to the difficulties encountered during construction, the length of the lock, originally intended to be 400 feet (120 m), was reduced to 320 feet (98 m). The width was 80 feet (24 m).

Machinery on the dock, including capstans and the lock gates, were worked by hydraulic power. The dock incorporated its own power supply, consisting of three 20 by 6 feet (6.1 by 1.8 m) (long by diameter) boilers supplying a 40 horsepower (30 kW) steam engine which powered both the hydraulic system via a hydraulic accumulator at 700 pounds per square inch (4,800 kPa), as well as being able to pump mains water around the dock. The works also required the resiting (1864) of the goods line and sidings of the North Eastern Railway's Hull and Selby Line. When completed the dock included a connection to the NER and had doubled track or wider rail sidings on both quays, with the rails crossing the lock entrance by a hydraulically operated swing girder bridge. The dock's sidings were connected to the NER's system west of the dock.

A small wharf was built outside the main dock for the shipping activities of the Manchester, Sheffield and Lincolnshire Railway (MS&LR). Both the wharf and main dock led into an entrance basin of 5 acres (2.0 ha), which was partially filled in c. 1875 to create more space for the MS&LR. (See also Railway Creek.)

The cost of the dock was £559,479 of which £113,582 was for the excavations, a similar amount for the dock walls and £88,655 for the entire lock constructions excluding the lock gates and machinery. The dock was opened in the presence of the Prince and Princess of Wales (Albert Edward, Prince of Wales, later Edward VII, and Alexandra, Princess of Wales) in 1869 and was named Albert Dock. (Note: 53.734888°N 0.346980°W Albert Dock)

Both the Albert and William Wright docks were closed to commercial vessels in 1972 and converted for use as fish docks. The Hull fish fleet moved to the docks in 1975. As of 2010, both docks remain in use for general cargo traffic, as well as being the landing point for the much reduced Hull fishing industry.

In December 2013, a North Sea storm surge and high tide (Cyclone Xaver) caused overtopping of Albert Dock from the Riverside Quay waterfront and through the lockgates, resulting in flooding in Hull city centre. As a result, a flood defence improvement scheme was brought forward by two years; work on the £6.3 million flood defence improvement including a 3,120 feet (950 m) long wall 3 feet 3 inches (1 m) high began in November 2014; the wall was completed by November 2015.

==== William Wright Dock ====
While the Albert Dock was still under construction, the dock company obtained the Hull Docks Act 1866 (29 & 30 Vict. c. lxxvii) allowing the extension of the dock westwards, and the Hull Docks Act 1867 (30 & 31 Vict. c. xxv) (Note: Allison (1969) gives an incorrect date of 1865 for the authority to build the William Wright Dock.) that allowed further expansion to the west and south.

Construction began in 1873, with R. A. Marillier as engineer and John Hawkshaw as consulting engineer. The dock was planned as an 8-acre (3.2 ha) extension of the Albert Dock accessed via a 60 foot (18 m) channel. The foundation stone was formally laid by William Wright in 1876.

The dock opened in 1880 and was named William Wright Dock after the chairman of the dock company. The dock was 5.75 acres (2.33 ha) in size. (Note: 53.7313815°N 0.358812°W William Wright Dock)

The 2013 storm surge (Cyclone Xaver) caused damage to the north-western wall of the dock—as a result Associated British Ports (ABP) sought to infill approximately 22,000 square feet (2,000 m^{2}) of the dock as a repair.

==== Riverside Quay ====
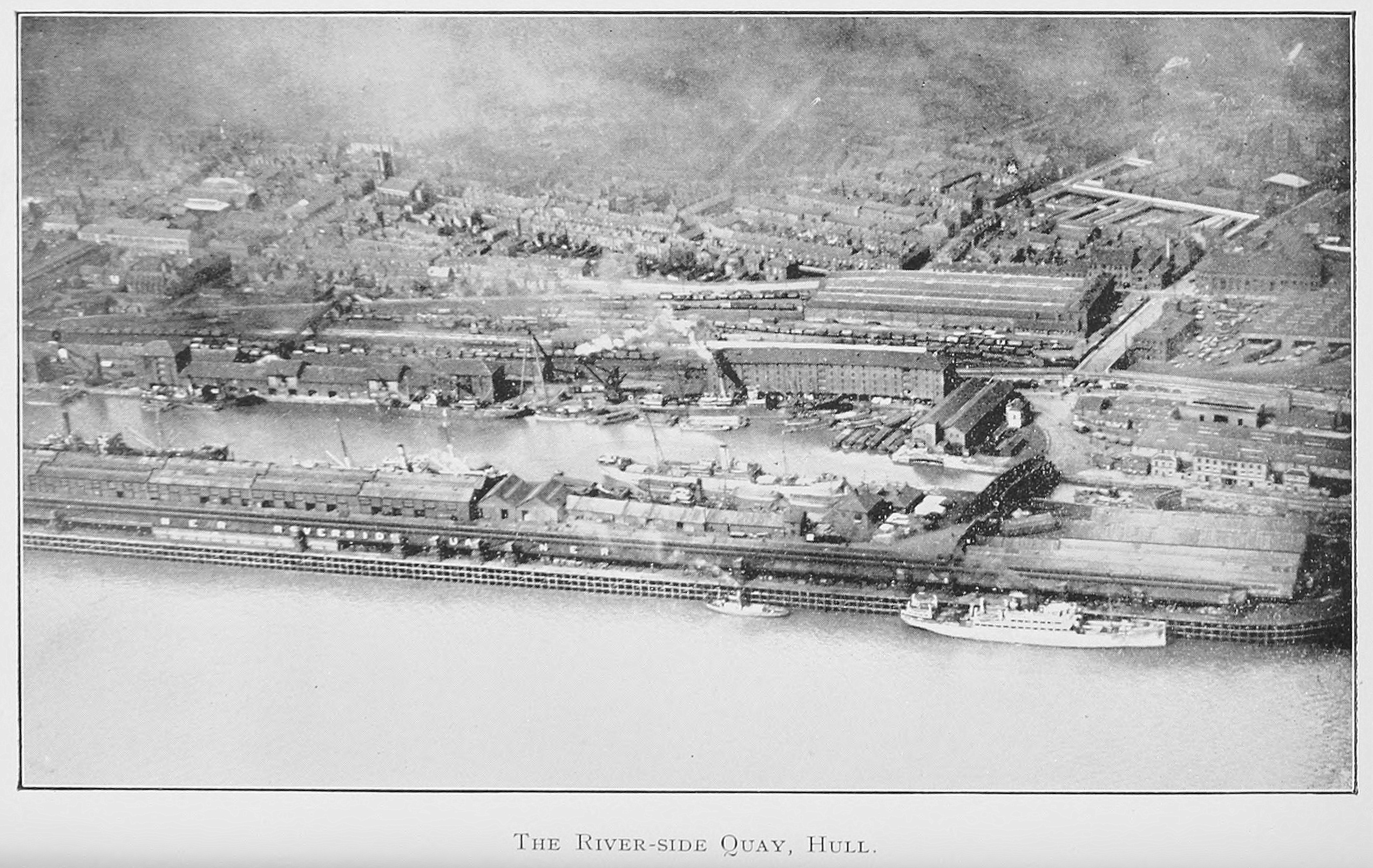
Riverside Quay in 1922

In 1904, the North Eastern Railway (NER), then the main owner of the Hull docks, applied to Parliament for powers to build a quay along the bank of the Humber Estuary, adjacent to its Albert Dock, and related works. Permission was obtained in 1905 to construct a quay of up to 5,580 feet (1,700 m) in length, and to dredge to a depth of 16 feet (4.9 m) below the low water level of ordinary spring tides.

The quay was designed as a deep water quay for foodstuffs and other goods requiring rapid handling. It avoided delays in entering locks, or having to wait for a low tide to turn. Additional works included construction of a two-storey warehouse for the fruit trade on the adjacent side of the Albert Dock, and the replacement of the single line railway swing bridge over the dock's entrance with a double track bridge.

A quay of 2,500 feet (760 m) was constructed along the timbered wharf outward from Albert Dock, extending around 90 feet (27 m) farther into the estuary. The construction consisted of a bank of Middlesbrough slag around 40 feet (12 m) in depth deposited abutting the former quay wall, with about a 45° facing slope supported at the base by sheet piling. The quay's remaining support was formed on blue gum and pitch pine timber pilings, spaced around 10 feet (3.0 m). The long blue gum piles extended above ground level to form the supports for the structure's roof. As built, the quay was equipped with hydraulically powered capstans for shunting, and electric cranes; a water supply for ship supply and fire fighting was fitted, and gas lighting used. The electrical equipment was supplied by Craven Brothers. Hydraulic power was supplied via an accumulator tower which also functioned as a clock tower but was demolished after the Second World War.

The pier also incorporated a passenger station for continental boat trains. 600 feet (180 m) of the quay was equipped for passenger traffic, with the quay decking raised 3 feet (0.91 m) to provide a platform. The station was used as a terminus for boat trains.

The quay came into use in 1907. Initial operations were by the Lancashire & Yorkshire Railway (L&YR) and NER's joint ferry to Zeebrugge, followed by ships to Norway operated by Wilson Line, and to Rotterdam by the Hull & Netherlands Steamship Company. The quay was fully completed by 1911.

In the Second World War Hull Blitz, the quay was destroyed by fires started by enemy bombing in May 1941. In the 1950s, a new 1,065-foot (325 m) long concrete quay was constructed and officially opened in 1959. The south side of Albert Dock was modernised to a similar design as the new Riverside Quay in 1964. (Note: 53.735362°N 0.341550°W Riverside Quay (1950s replacement), original quay extended twice as far west)

=== St Andrew's Dock ===
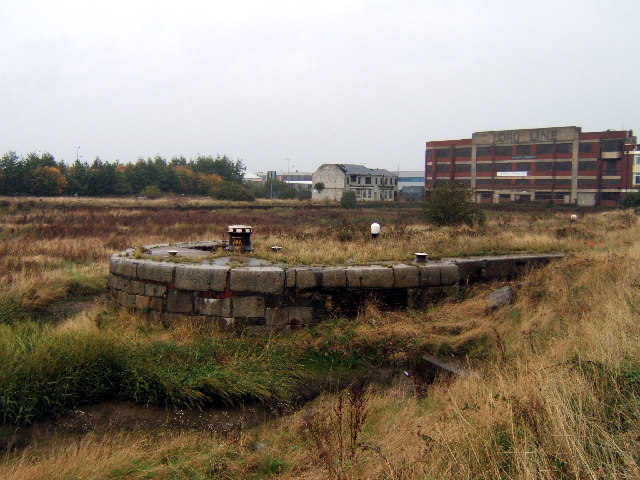
The silted dock in 2005

St Andrew's Dock was constructed at the same time as the extension of Albert Dock. The initial scheme was for a 10-acre (4.0 ha) dock, 1,802 feet (549 m) in length, entered from the Humber by a 250 by 50 feet (76 by 15 m) long by wide lock. As with the Albert Dock extension, the engineers were Marillier and Hawkshaw.

The dock was opened in 1883, directly to the west of William Wright Dock, with an area of over 10.5 acres (4.2 ha). Originally intended to be used for coal handling, it was used entirely for the fishing industry. (Note: Wright (1875, p. 90) says the dock was intended for general trade.)

The dock was extended by about 10 acres (4.0 ha) after the Hull Dock Company was taken over by the North Eastern Railway, with work beginning in 1894. This work included the construction of slipways for boat repair. The new dock, St Andrew's Dock Extension, was connected at the west end via a channel; the slipways were at the far west end. While under construction, a cofferdam at the west end burst. This resulted in practically every vessel in the dock being damaged. The £20,000 damages included the destruction of three steamers and three other vessels. The cause was thought to be underground springs released during the pile driving and excavations.

In the late 1930s, plans were made for improvements and expansion at the dock. By 1938 the major part of the plans had been postponed, with no expansion of the dock. In 1947, discussions about improvements to the dock's slipways were resumed, but no work was done.

The dock was in use until 1975 when the fishing industry was moved to Albert Dock at which point it closed. Partial filling in of the dock began in the 1980s. The western part has been redeveloped into the St Andrews Quay retail park, while the eastern part of the dock around the entrance was declared a conservation area in 1990 because of its social historic interest. The dock entrance, and some shipping company buildings remain in situ, but the remains of the dock are completely silted up. (Note: 53.729312°N 0.367407°W St Andrew's Dock (location close to eastern entrance))

In 2013, the charity St Andrew's Dock Heritage Park Action Group (STAND) selected a design for a memorial to the 6,000 Hull trawlermen who lost their lives in the fishing industry, to be sited next to the Humber at the dock.

=== Alexandra Dock ===
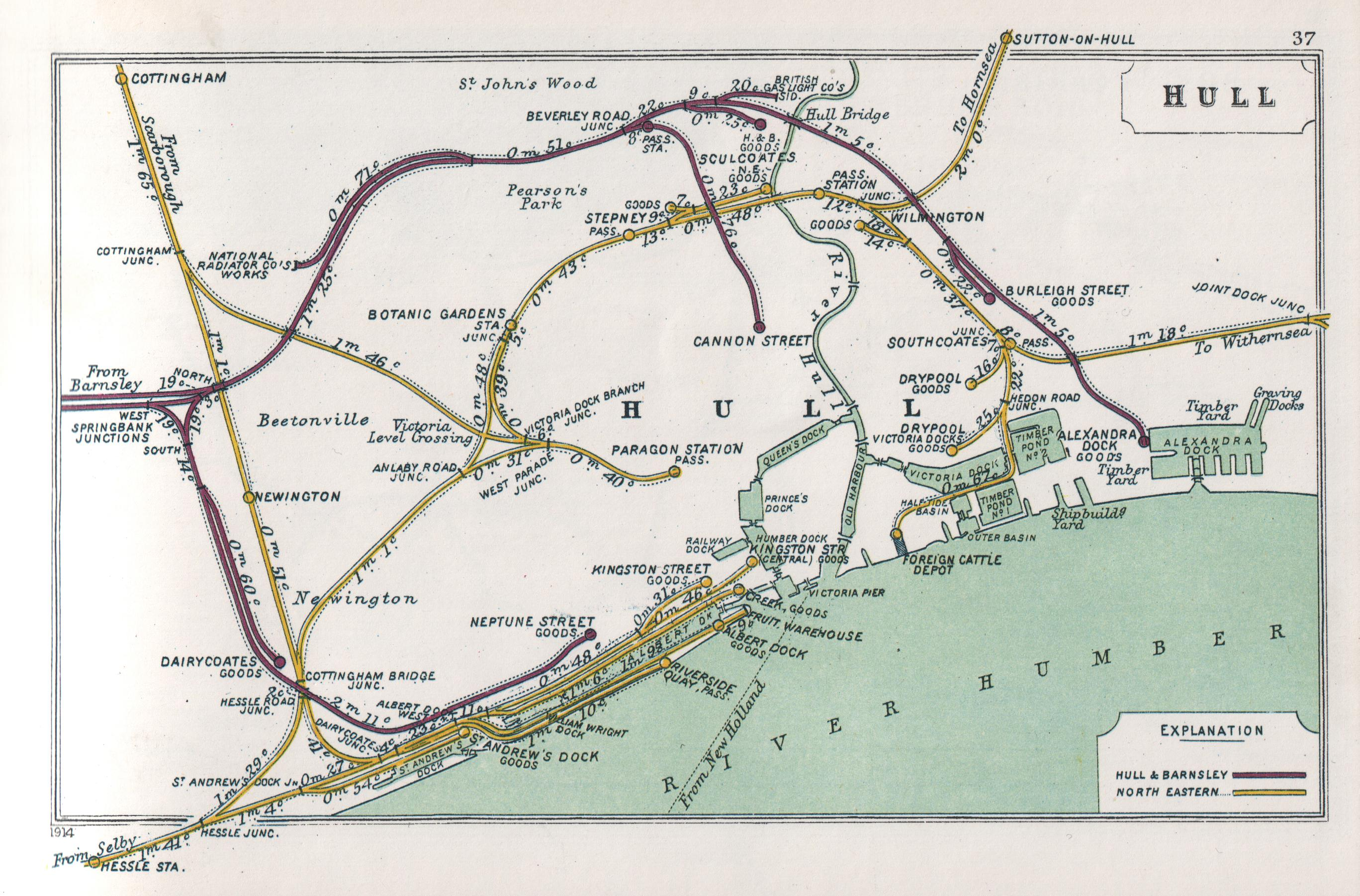
Map of 1914 showing the Alexandra Dock, extended Victoria Dock, Town and West Docks, and the rail systems of the H&BR and the NER

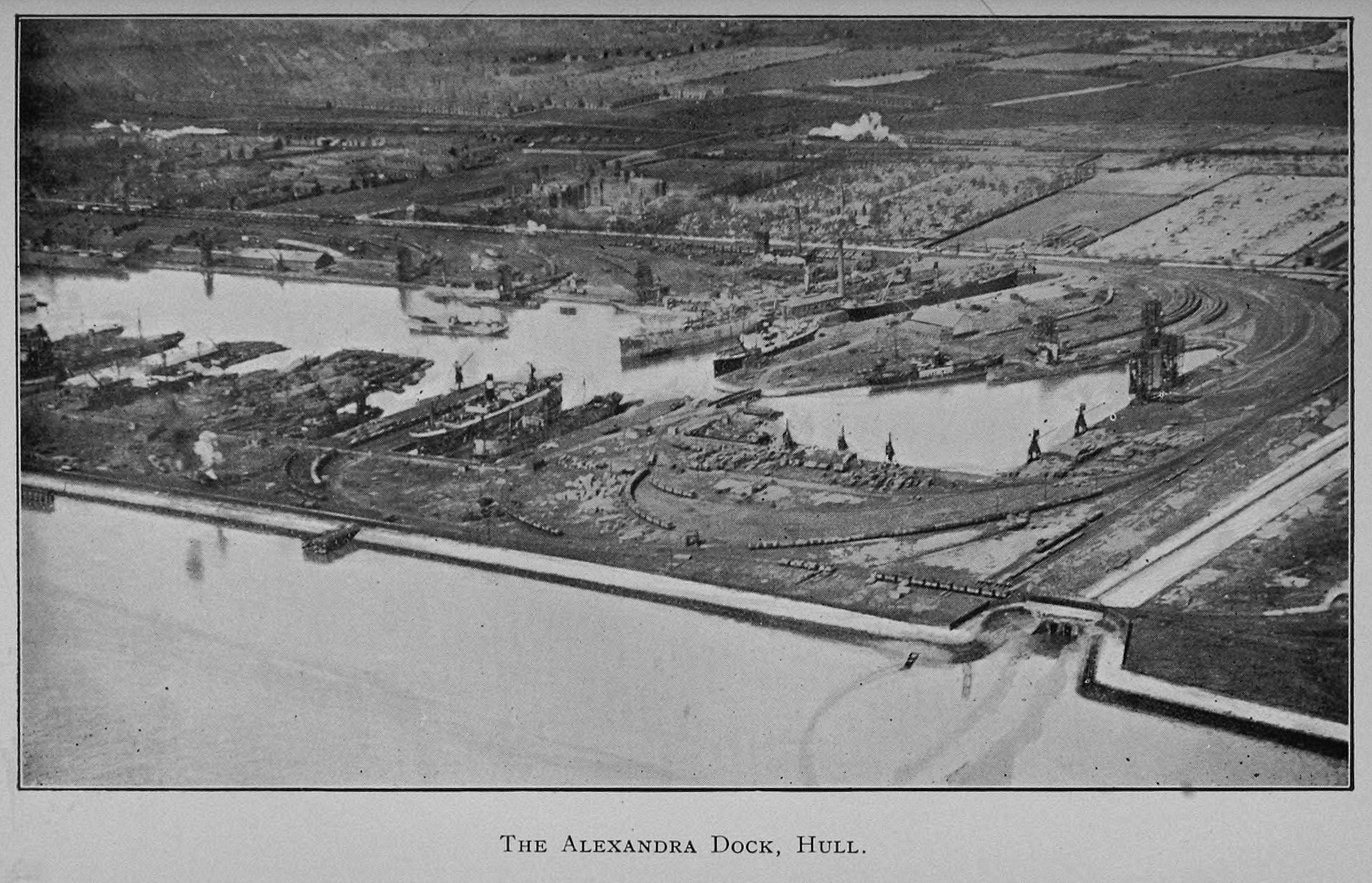
Alexandra Dock, Hull in 1922

The Alexandra Dock was built between 1881 and 1885 on land reclaimed from the Humber as part of developments built by the Hull, Barnsley and West Riding Junction Railway and Dock Company. Its design was by James Abernethy, and carried out by a partnership of engineers James Oldham and George Bohn, with A. C. Hurtzig as resident engineer. The contractors were Lucas and Aird. The dock machinery, including lock gates and unloading equipment, was hydraulically powered and supplied by Armstrong, Mitchell & Company. Pumping machines for the dry docks, and to regulate the water level of the main dock were supplied by Gwynne and Company (London)—two 400 horsepower (300 kW) high pressure condensing engines drove centrifugal pumps, the engines powered by six Lancashire boilers.

The dock was built to the east of Victoria Dock with an outlet to the Humber. Water to fill the dock came from the Holderness Drain, which was intended to minimise the silting up of the dock that would be caused by ingress of water from the Humber. The dock had an area of 46.5 acres (18.8 ha), on a site of 192 acres (78 ha) of which 152 acres (62 ha) was on land within the tidal range of the Humber, requiring the construction of a 6,000 foot (1,800 m) embankment to reclaim the land. Steam and hydraulically powered equipment was used to aid the construction of the dock. Blows (or "Boils") were encountered during the construction of the lock foundations, and at a point in the dock wall, which threatened to undermine the foundations and required remedial work. The dock walls were planned to be built of chalk rubble faced with ashlar. A strike by masons led to some lower sections of the walls being built using portland cement. The tops of the dock walls were faced with granite. Dredged material from the creation of a channel from the entrance to the deep water channel in the Humber was used to infill parts of the made walls in the dock and to embank the foreshore to the east of the dock.

The dock was opened on 16 July 1885 and named after Alexandra, Princess of Wales. The cost of the works was £1,355,392.

The entrance lock was 550 feet (170 m) long and 85 feet (26 m) wide. Two graving docks, one 500 feet (150 m) long and 60 feet (18 m) wide, the other a little larger, were built at the north-east corner of the dock. The dock's primary purpose was the export of coal. (Note: 53.744753°N 0.296448°W Alexandra Dock)

In 1899, the dock was expanded by 7 acres (2.8 ha), officially opened on 25 September 1899. The extended area added approximately 0.5 miles (0.8 km) of quayside and was built to the same depth as the earlier dock, with the dock walls now constructed of concrete. The contractor was Whitaker and Sons of Horsforth, Leeds, under R. Pawley of the H&BR. The extension was originally fitted for the handling of coal and pit props, with four coal hoists.

A pier onto the Humber Estuary (West Wharf) was added in 1911, the pier was 1,350 feet (410 m) long with an 18 feet (5.5 m) minimum depth of water at spring tides and was equipped with electric conveyors for the transportation of coal. (Note: 53.741333°N 0.302336°W Alexandra Dock west pier (West Wharf), built 1911, planned site of 'Quay 2005' expansion, and site of expansion of 'Green Port Hull' (planned 2013))

Alexandra Dock closed in 1982, at which time the connection to the rail network was removed. In 1991, the dock re-opened but without a rail connection.

In the early 1990s, part of the port land was developed as a dredged aggregate marine terminal and plant, operated as Humber Sand and Gravel Co. (est. 1993), a joint venture between Hanson (formerly ARC) and CEMEX. a concrete batching plant was built on the dock land in the late 1990s for Ready Mix Concrete Ltd. (later CEMEX UK Materials).

Associated British Ports (Hull) Harbour Revision Order 2006
- Statutory Instrument
- Parliament of the United Kingdom
- Citation: SI 2006/1135
- Territorial extent: United Kingdom

Dates
- Made: 13 April 2006
- Commencement: 25 April 2006
Other legislation
Made under	Harbours Act 1964

Status: Current legislation

Text of statute as originally enacted

In the 1990s, development of a riverside container terminal, Quay 2000, was proposed. The scheme, later named Quay 2005, was to be built at the site of the West Wharf. A public enquiry was required, due to objections from residents of the Victoria Dock Village. The inspector recommended refusal of the scheme, but the decision was over-ruled by the Department of Transport, and the project gained approved in December 2005. The Associated British Ports (Hull) Harbour Revision Order 2006 (SI 2006/1135) allowing the work came into effect in 2006. Construction of the facility, renamed Hull Riverside Container Terminal, was initially planned to be complete by 2008; construction of the terminal was delayed, and the scheme was later adapted to attract an offshore wind power business to the port. (See § Green Port Hull.)

As of 2010 the dock handled cargoes including aggregates, bulk agricultural products, bulk chemicals and wood, and also had a Ro-Ro terminal.

==== Green Port Hull ====
In January 2011, Siemens and Associated British Ports signed a memorandum of understanding (MOU) concerning the construction of wind energy machine manufacturing plant at Alexandra Dock. Infrastructure for the proposed development would also make use of the planned Quay 2005 riverside facilities, which had already gained planning consent, and had an extant environmental mitigation at Chowder Ness. The site was favoured because of its relative proximity to planned large-scale wind farms in the North Sea (Dogger Bank, Hornsea, and East Anglia Array wind farms), and the presence of existing port infrastructure.

The Quay 2005 scheme included reclamation of 19 acres (7.5 ha) of land west of the dock entrance, on the banks of the Humber Estuary. In the original scheme the reclaimed area was roughly a right trapezoid which projected well over 330 feet (100 m) into the Humber, with a south facing front of over 1,300 feet (400 m); (Note: Roughly approximating to the outline of the 1911 "West Wharf".) the instrument also allowed dredging of the quay and approaches of up to 38 feet (11.5 m) below chart datum.

The development, Green Port Hull, included the Quay 2005 estuary wharf, repurposed as a facility for wind turbine logistics. It also required the infilling of the dock west of the lock gates with about 28,000,000 cu ft (780,000 m^{3}) of material to create additional land for operations. The initial plan included a nacelle factory of up to 380,000 square feet (35,000 m^{2}), plus office, warehousing, and external storage areas, as well as a helipad and a wind turbine of up to 6 MW. The works were to take up most of the dock area except for land around, and including, dry dock facilities in the north-east corner. Businesses located in the dock were to be relocated, primarily to other sites within the Port of Hull. (Note: Hull City Council planning applications: "(11/01178/PAAD) Infilling of parts of Alexandra Dock (7.68 Ha; 19 Acres), construction of 2 roll on-roll off ramps within the Dock, and refurbishment of existing eastern lead in jetty to Alexandra Dock [...]". Hull City Council. 14 December 2011.; "(11/01180/LBC) Listed Building Consent Application for works associated with the Green Port Hull development involving [...]". Hull City Council. 14 December 2011.; "(11/01177/OUT) Development of land at Alexandra Dock, including the demolition of existing buildings (excluding the listed hydraulic engine house and tower and adjacent unlisted chimney), for use as a facility for the manufacture, assembly, storage, handling and testing of wind turbine components for the offshore power industry [...]". Hull City Council. 14 December 2011.; "(11/01176/S73) Green Port Hull: Application under section 73 of the Town and Country Planning Act 1990 to carry out works authorised by The Associated British Ports (Hull) Harbour Revision Order 2006 [...]". Hull City Council. 14 December 2011.; "(11/01179/FULL) Demolition of existing building and full planning permission for the erection of a 3 MW operational wind turbine [...]". Hull City Council. 15 December 2011.)

Initial expectations were for construction to begin in 2012 and the facility to be operational by 2014. The conclusion of the agreement was delayed because of planning issues and uncertainties over the UK's renewable energy policy. Relocation of existing businesses had taken place by 2012.

The Siemens and ABP 2011 MOU agreement was finalised in March 2014. (Note: An additional site near Paull, East Riding of Yorkshire, east of King George Dock, Hull was added to the plans, intended to manufacture rotor blades for turbines.) In late 2014 modified plans combined the two production facilities at Alexandra Dock. ABP investment in the port facilities was estimated at £150 million, and Siemens investment at £160 million across the two sites. The facility was expected to become operational between 2016 and 2017. Plans for the turbine factory were submitted and approved in 2014. (Note: Hull City Council planning application: "(14/00777/FULL) Demolition/partial demolition of existing buildings; erection of buildings (including a single building of 22.991m high) [...]". Hull City Council. 19 June 2014.; "(14/00778/FULL) Demolition of existing buildings and erection of service and logistics building [...]". Hull City Council. 19 June 2014. Archived from the original on 24 December 2014.; "(14/00776/FULL) Erection of 6 x electricity sub stations [...]". Hull City Council. 19 June 2014. Archived from the original on 15 May 2015.) The contract (about £100 million) for dock civil engineering work was awarded to a joint venture of GRAHAM and Lagan Construction Group, with CH2M Hill as consulting engineers. Official groundbreaking took place in January 2015. Revised plans for the site submitted in April 2015 included only a blade manufacturing factory at the site, together with storage and other logistics facilities for wind farm installation work, with no nacelle production. VolkerFitzpatrick was awarded the contract to construct the blade factory in July 2015. Clugston Group was contracted to construct an associated service and logistics building in September 2015.

As part of the development, the Dead Bod graffiti, painted by Captain Len (Pongo) Rood in the 1960s on one of the West Wharf buildings, which had become a landmark to Humber shipping, was removed and saved for posterity. In early 2017, after restoration, the Dead Bod was temporarily removed to the Humber Street Gallery in Hull as part of the City of Culture 2017 celebrations.

The blade factory was formally inaugurated in the presence of Secretary of State for Business, Energy and Industrial Strategy, Greg Clark on 1 December 2016. The factory scheme has an expected lifespan of around 30 years, after which the site would be returned to general port use.

In August 2021, Siemans announced that a £186 million investment would be made in doubling the size of blade factory to handle larger blade sizes in excess of 330 feet (100 m) in length. The scheme was expected for completion by 2023.

=== Hull Joint Dock ===
Hull Joint Dock Act 1899
- Act of Parliament
- Parliament of the United Kingdom
- Long title: An Act for enabling the North Eastern Railway Company and the Hull Barnsley and West Riding Junction Railway and Dock Company to make a dock and railways at Hull and for other purposes.
- Citation: 62 & 63 Vict. c. ccxlii
- Territorial extent: United Kingdom

Dates
- Royal assent: 9 August 1899
- Commencement: 9 August 1899
Other legislation
Amended by	Hull Joint Dock Act 1906; Fylde Water Board Act 1910; Fylde Water Board Act 1912; Hull and Barnsley Railway Act 1914; Fylde Water Board Order 1960; British Transport Docks Act 1966; British Transport Docks Act 1973; County of Lancashire Act 1984; Associated British Ports (Hull) Act 1989

Status: Amended

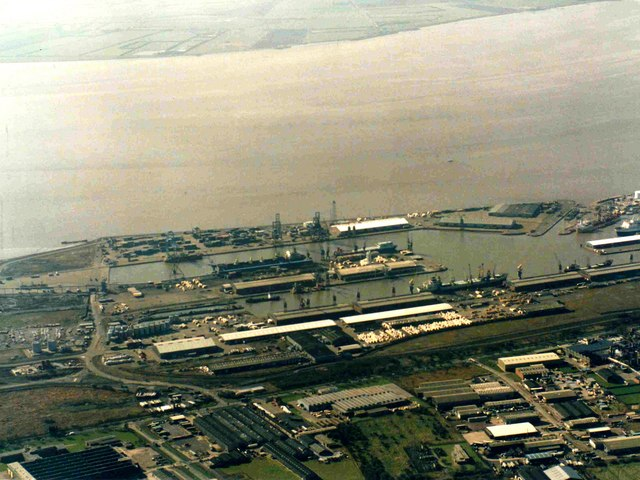
Aerial view of King George and Queen Elizabeth docks (1995)

The NER began planning for a rival dock east of Alexandra Dock in the 1890s. This led eventually to a joint agreement between the NER and the Hull and Barnsley Railway (HBR), and the Hull Dock Company, the Hull Joint Dock Act 1899 (62 & 63 Vict. c. ccxlii). Construction of the dock was delayed until 1906 and was completed in 1914, at which point the new dock became officially known as the King George Dock. An extension arm of the dock to the south-east, sharing the same lock, was opened as the Queen Elizabeth Dock in 1969. In 1993, the dock gained a terminal outside the lock gates, on the banks of the Humber, known as River Terminal 1. It is now known as Rotterdam Terminal, used by North Sea Ferries.

==== King George Dock (1914–) ====
By the early 1890s further expansion of the port facilities at Hull were required, in particular dock and handling facilities for large coal carrying vessels, as well as facilities for the new steam trawlers. The NER had been in discussion with the Hull Dock Company regarding investment and working arrangements, this led to a takeover of the Dock Company by the NER.

In 1892, the board of the NER had decided that a greater investment of around £1,000,000 in a new dock east of Alexandra Dock would be better spent than expending a smaller sum, of around £22,000, on expanding the entrance to the Dock Company's Albert Dock. It put bills before Parliament for the amalgamation of the Dock Company, and for a new dock. (Note: The dock proposals were submitted as part of a wider number of schemes. See "North Eastern Railway. Additional Powers with reference to new and existing Railways, Dock, Roads, Footpaths, and other Works and Lands in Northumberland, Newcastle-upon-Tyne, Durham, York (North East and West Ridings), and Kingston-upon-Hull; [...]". The London Gazette (26226). pp. 6270–71, § 8–12. 23 November 1891.) Both bills were rejected; the amalgamation bill was resubmitted in 1893, with clauses protecting the interests of the Hull and Barnsley Railway (HBR), which feared the possibility of a rival dock adjacent to their own Alexandra Dock. As such, the bill contained clauses requiring the NER to inform the HBR of any planned dock to the east and allow them the option to join as partners in any such development. The North Eastern Railway (Hull Docks) Act 1893 (56 & 57 Vict. c. cxcviii) was passed, and the amalgamation took place in 1893. The NER submitted bills for extensive dock improvements in Hull in 1897, (Note: Submitted as part of a wider number of schemes, see "North-Eastern Railway. Power to make Dock Works at Kingston-upon-Hull and Middlesbrough; Additional Powers with reference to new and existing Railways, Roads, Footpaths and other Works [...]". The London Gazette (26797). p. 6724, § 1–10; p. 6725, §A-C. 24 November 1896.) and again in 1898 with an expanded improvement scheme, (Note: Submitted as part of a wider number of schemes, see "North Eastern Railway. Power to make Dock Works at Kingston-upon-Hull; Additional Powers with reference to new and existing Railways, Roads, Footpaths, and other Works, [...]". The London Gazette (26913). pp. 6704–05, §1–14. 23 November 1897.) both of which were abandoned over responsibilities regarding dredging the river. The following year the NER submitted a bill for a new dock east of Alexandra, jointly with the HBR, including new connecting rail lines (Note: See "North Eastern and Hull and Barnsley Railways (Joint Dock). Power to the North Eastern Railway Company and the Hull, Barnsley and West Riding Junction Railway and Dock Company, Jointly and Separately, to Make a New Dock Railways and Works at Kingston-upon-Hull; Constitution of Joint Committee; Running Powers to North Eastern Railway Company over part of Hull and Barnsley Railway; Agreements between the said Companies; Additional Capital Powers for the said Companies; Application of Funds and Amendment of Acts". The London Gazette (27025): 7252–55. 22 November 1898., also "Harbours and Waterways" (PDF). The Engineer. Vol. 85. 15 April 1898. p. 348.)—this was passed as the Hull Joint Dock Act 1899.

Hull Joint Dock Act 1906
- Act of Parliament
- Parliament of the United Kingdom
- Long title: An Act to confer additional powers upon the Hull Joint Dock Committee for the construction of dock works and upon the North Eastern Railway Company for the construction of new railways and for other purposes.
- Citation: 6 Edw. 7. c. xlvi
- Territorial extent: United Kingdom

Dates
- Royal assent: 20 July 1906
- Commencement: 20 July 1906
Other legislation
Amends	Hull Joint Dock Act 1899

Status: Current legislation

Text of statute as originally enacted

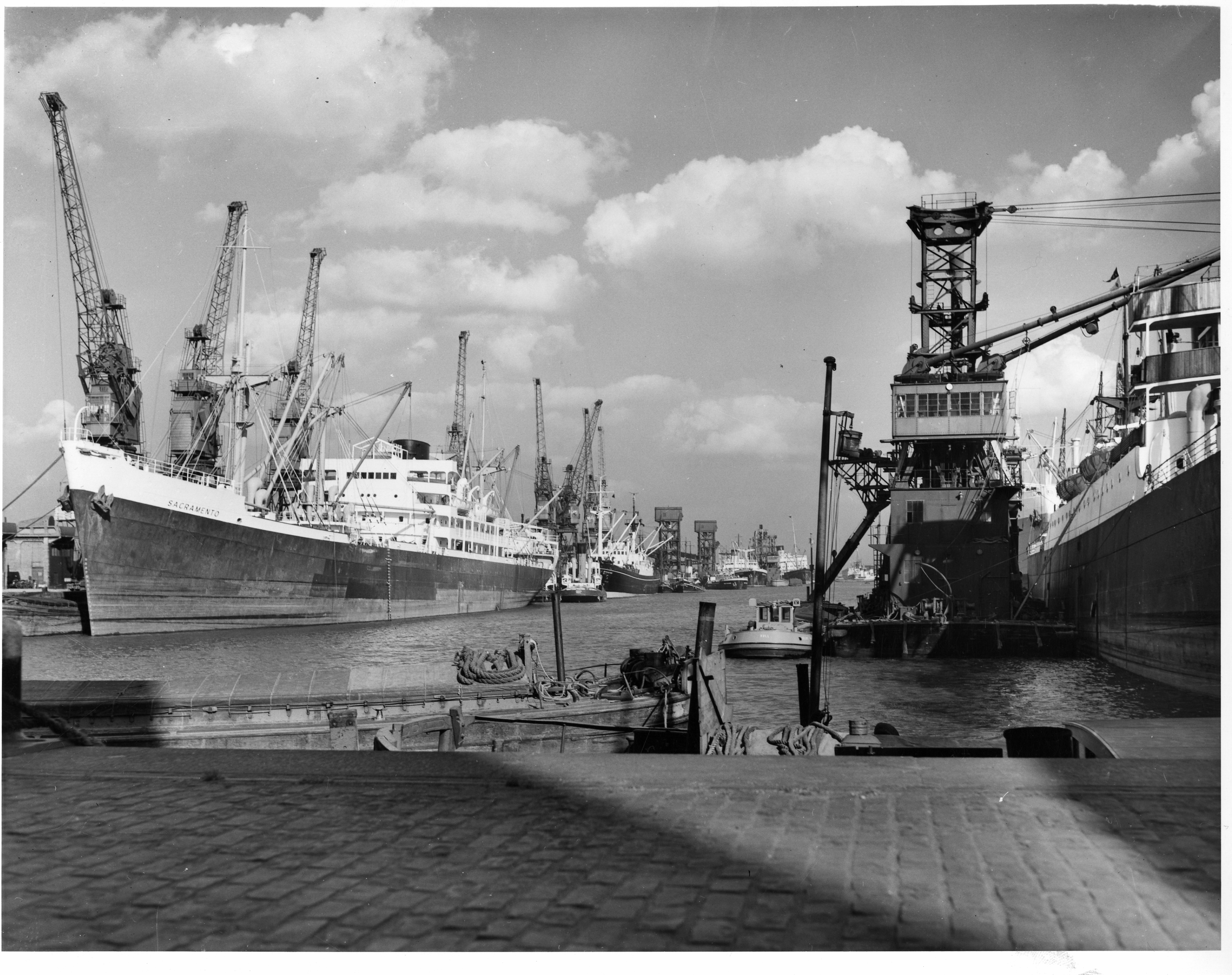
King George Dock in 1956

The two companies estimated (1899) the cost of the development at £1,419,555, of which the dock and lock were estimated at £1,194,160; the scheme was expected to take seven years to complete. The act had specified a dock of 60 acres (24 ha) which was expected to have been completed by 1906. The initial construction was reduced to 32 acres (13 ha) due to the high cost of the tenders received for the original design. The Hull Joint Dock Act 1906 (6 Edw. 7. c. xlvi) made minor modifications to the original scheme, and extended the time for the construction of the dock. (Note: See "Hull Joint Dock. Power to the Hull Joint Dock Committee to make an Alteration of the authorized River Wall and Dock Works at Kingston-upon-Hull; Extension of Time for completion of authorized Dock Works and Railways; Power to North Eastern Railway Company to make new Railways and Works at Kingston-Upon-Hull and to abandon part of Victoria Dock Branch; Agreements with Corporation of Kingston-upon-Hull; Acquisition of Lands; Application of Funds; and Amendment of Acts". The London Gazette (27855): 7717–18. 17 November 1905.)

Construction of the dock was contracted to S. Pearson & Son in 1906, with an estimated value of £850,000. At the same time, the Great Central Railway's rival, Immingham Dock, was under construction on the south bank of the Humber. Most of the dock site was beyond the bank of the Humber as it then existed, requiring reclamation of ground from the Humber foreshore. Two temporary banks were constructed, enclosing 30 and 50 acres (12 and 20 ha), plus a timber dam beyond the southernmost bank closing off the soon-to-be-constructed lock. Due to underground water pressure, the underlying glacial geology of the Humber was weak, containing strata of quicksand. By early 1911 the embankments enclosing the new dock area were nearly complete. as were most of the excavations for the dock itself, and the dock's walls. The dock's lock required insertion of steel sheet piles as far as 47 feet (14 m) below the bottom of the lock to create a watertight surround for the construction, as a result of water containing gravel in the underlying geology. The dock walls were of concrete, faced and coped with Staffordshire blue bricks and granite. Some dock walls were built as sloped constructions, with blue gum timber wharfing, due to poor ground conditions preventing satisfactory foundations.

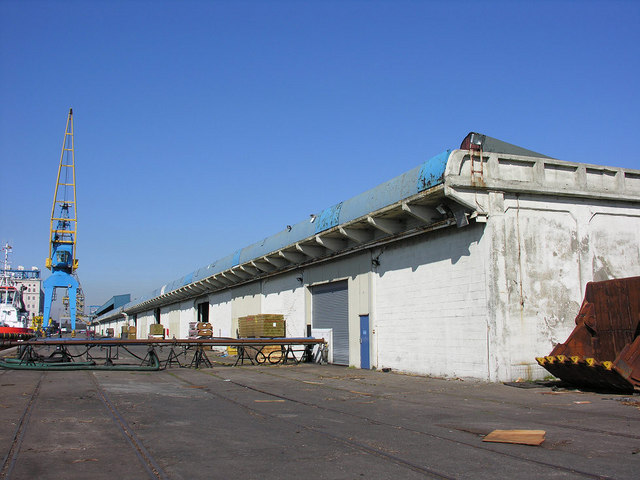
1914 single storey ferro-concrete storage shed, north-western arm, north quay (2007). (Note: Three 375 by 90 feet (114 by 27 m) single-storey on the north side, and three 375 by 70 feet (114 by 21 m) two-storey ferro-concrete warehouses on the south side, each with flat roof areas also usable for storage.)

As built in 1914, the dock had a water area of 53 acres (21 ha) and consisted of a central area of around 1,000 by 1,050 feet (300 by 320 m) connected to the river by a lock running north-east to south-west. Two main arms to the north-east and north-west were initially constructed, both around 1,350 feet (410 m) long. The western arm had warehousing facilities, while the central and eastern part of the northernmost quay had six coaling berths designed to allow ships to dock diagonally at the dockside. The main lock was itself 750 by 85 feet (229 by 26 m) long divided into two sections of 500 and 250 feet (152 and 76 m) by another set of gates. (Note: 53.741214°N 0.271790°W King George Dock (entrance lock)) Water depth in the lock would be between 19.75 and 42.25 feet (6.02 and 12.88 m) between low water and high spring tides, while the dock itself was to be maintained at a minimum depth of 32 feet 8 inches (9.96 m). The design allowed for expansion through two further arms to the south-east and south-west, giving a potential ultimate area of around 85 acres (34 ha). Two graving docks were sited at the eastern end of the north-eastern arm of 550 by 66 feet (168 by 20 m) and 450 by 72 feet (137 by 22 m), each with a water depth of up to 22 feet (6.7 m).

Much of the dock equipment was operated by electricity, supplied at 440 V from Hull Corporation, including electric coal conveyors, cranes, and dock lighting, as well as powering pumps used to supply hydraulic power. Hydraulic equipment (from Hathorn Davey of Leeds) was used for lock and dry dock gates, and for the coal tippers. Cranes were supplied by Royce Limited (Manchester), Craven Brothers, and a floating crane by Werfo Gusto (A. F. Smulders); coal handling equipment was from Head Wrightson. The machinery and mechanism for the lock gates were manufactured by the Hydraulic Engineering Company (Chester); the centrifugal pumps and electric motors for draining the dry docks were made by W. H. Allen of Bedford.

On 26 June 1914, King George V visited Hull and formally opened the Hull Joint Dock. The dock was subsequently named King George Dock in his honour. The dock's design was undertaken by Sir Benjamin Baker and Sir John Wolfe-Barry. Its construction was supervised by T. M. Newell and R. Pawley, with W. Ebdon as resident engineer, and T. L. Norfolk as superintendent of equipment construction. Architectural design of the dock's offices was by the NER's architect William Bell.

The dock was home, for a period of time, to the NER's Pals Battalion, the 17th Battalion Northumberland Fusiliers. The battalion arrived for training at the dock on 22 September 1914. In November 1914, the battalion moved to stations along the East Yorkshire coast, with the headquarters remaining at the docks. On 20 June 1915, the battalion left the docks for Catterick.

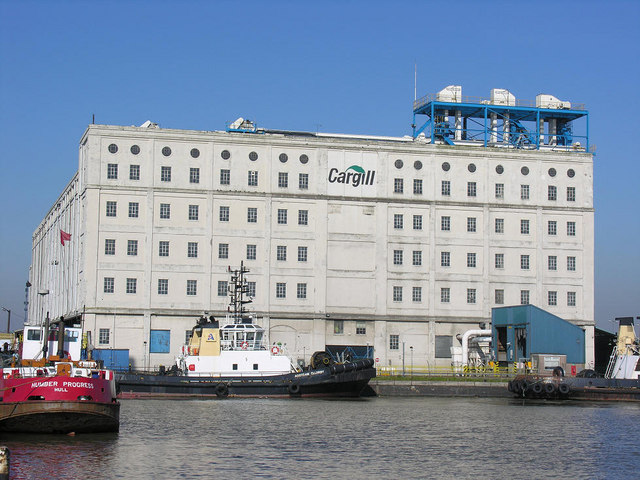
1919 Grain Silo (2007)

A 40,000 t (39,000 long tons; 44,000 short tons) ferro-concrete grain silo was under construction in 1914 at the end of the north-western quay and was complete by 1919. The main building consisted of two blocks 96 by 241 feet (29 by 73 m) wide by long, each holding 144 storage bins each 12 feet (3.7 m) square and 50 feet (15 m) deep. Each building block was connected to either the north or south quays of the north-west quay via a receiving house with weighing equipment, and by subways under the quayside, extending for 900 feet (270 m). The foundations for the building and the quay subways were constructed by the dock contractors (S. Pearson), the main building was built by the British Reinforced Concrete Engineering Company, and the grain handling equipment supplied by Henry Simon Limited (Manchester).

In 1959, the British Transport Commission authorised a £4,750,000 improvement scheme for the dock. The largest part of the scheme (£2,000,000) was the extension of the north quay by the total removal of coal loading equipment, and conversion of the echelon (diagonal) berthing arrangement on the far north and north-east dock walls into standard straight dockside. Other improvements included replacement of timber quay structures with concrete ones (specifically the south-west arm), over 400,000 square feet (37,000 m^{2}) of storage in single-storey sheds, new electric cranes, and additional grain handling equipment, as well as investment in mobile mechanical handling equipment including fork lift trucks and mobile cranes. Also included in the works were expansion of the grain silo capacity and an impounding station designed to maintain the dock water at a high level.

In 1965, the creation of berths for use by roll-on roll-off ferries began, increasing use of the dock for unit freight transport.

==== Queen Elizabeth Dock extension (1969–) ====
In 1968, work on a 28 acres (11 ha) extension to King George Dock built on reclaimed land to the south-east of the dock was begun. The extension was officially opened in August 1969 by Queen Elizabeth II and named Queen Elizabeth Dock. (Note: 53.739606°N 0.261192°W Queen Elizabeth Dock (extension to King George Dock))

==== Recent history (1970–) ====
A container terminal was opened in 1971 at Queen Elizabeth Dock. Two roll on-roll off terminals were opened in 1973 and by 1975 there were six such terminals in the two docks.

In 1984, Anglia Oils (now AarhusKarlshamn) opened an automated vegetable oil refinery on the King George Dock estate.

PD Ports (originally Humberside Sea and Land Services) began operating the Hull Container Terminal in 1990. By the mid-2000s throughput was over 100,000 TEU per annum, with Samskip as the primary customer.

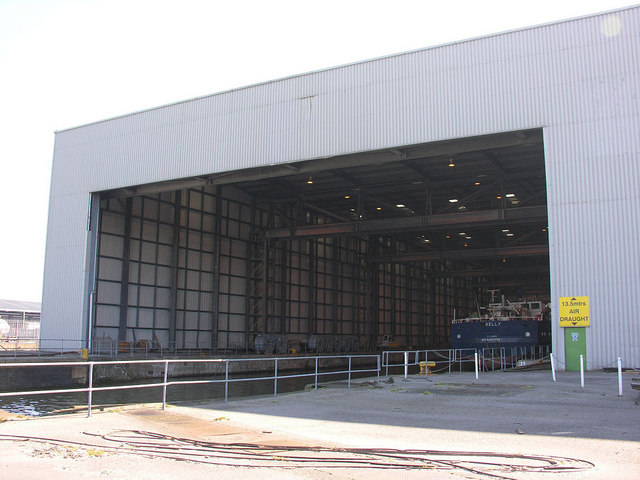
"Hull All Weather Terminal" (2007). (Note: The terminal was built over the unlocked former dry dock. (Note: 53.74163°N 0.25743°W, "Hull All Weather terminal", built over former southern dry dock, north-eastern dock arm, King George Dock))

In 1993, River Terminal 1, a terminal for large roll-on roll-off vessels, constructed at a cost of £12 million, opened on the banks of the Humber Estuary south of the King George Dock. (Note: 53.741081°N 0.282001°W River Terminal 1, ro-ro terminal) A covered terminal was opened in 1997, initially built for steel handling for British Steel Corporation. It was renamed Hull All-Weather Terminal in 2009, and the facilities were expanded to allow the handling of other weather sensitive goods, including dry bulks, paper, and agribulks (fertiliser). A covered shed for paper products (Finland Terminal), opened in 2000, had expanded to 70,000 sq ft (6,500 m^{2}) by 2006.

In 2001, new facilities were inaugurated on the banks of the Humber. The Rotterdam Terminal (on the site of the 1993 River Terminal 1), was built at a cost of £14.3 million to serve the P&O North Sea Ferries' new ships, the Pride of Rotterdam and Pride of Hull, used on the Hull-Rotterdam route.

The 1919 grain silo was demolished in 2010–11.

As of 2010, other facilities at the two docks included a 850,000 cu ft (24,000 m^{3}) cold store and passenger services to Zeebrugge. The company AarhusKarlshamn operates a large vegetable-based oil products processing plant at the dock, and the Kingston Terminal at the south-east of Queen Elizabeth Dock is used for import of coal products. In 2010, there were ten roll on-roll off berths within the two docks.

In 2013, a 1,000,000 t (980,000 long tons; 1,100,000 short tons) per year capacity sea to rail biomass facility, with a 164 foot (50 m) silo was constructed to supply Drax power station. The facility was officially opened by Councillor Mary Glew, Lord Mayor of Hull, in December 2014. A 160 by 390 foot (50 by 120 m) specialised biomass dry bulk warehouse was opened in late 2015.

== Other facilities ==
=== Dry docks ===
In addition to the dry docks in King George, Alexandra, and William Wright Docks, there were dry docks on the sides of the River Hull. Hull Central Dry Dock (also known as South End Dock) on the west bank of the River Hull near to its outfall onto the Humber Estuary (Note: 53.738960°N 0.332687°W Hull Central Dry Dock (disused)) was the largest, being 345 feet (105 m) long with an entrance of 51 feet (16 m), the dock having been extended several times. Built in 1843 and later extended, the dock has been disused since 1992 and is now a Grade II listed structure. In September 2013 the City Council approved plans by Watergate Developments Ltd to turn the dock into an open-air entertainment venue. This is part of an adjacent office space development, known as the Centre for Digital Innovation (C4Di), developed by Wykeland as @TheDock. Construction work on the C4Di building began late 2014. In December 2014, construction began on a concrete dam wall permanently sealing the dock.

On the east bank of the River Hull were Crown Dry Dock, (Note: 53.742867°N 0.328809°W Crown Dry Dock, no longer extant, but lock gates remain as frontage onto the River Hull as of 2010) 104 by 21 feet (31.7 by 6.4 m) halfway between the river outfall and the entrance to Victoria Dock's Drypool Basin. Farther upstream was Union Dock, 214 by 48.5 feet (65.2 by 14.8 m), opposite the entrance to Queen's Dock, (Note: 53.746528°N 0.328345°W Union Dry Dock, as of 2010 still extant but completely silted, the entrance to the dock is crossed by steel footbridge along the River Hull east bank footpath) dating to the first half of the 1800s, and a third dock farther upstream. (Note: 53.749218°N 0.330899°W Dry Dock, (defunct))

On the west bank of the River Hull, there were ship repair facilities just within the city walls at North Gate on the river dating back as far as the 15th century, with slipways by the 18th century. The entrance to Queen's Dock was later built in this area, and two dry docks remain: North Bridge Dry Dock and No. 1 Dry Dock to the north and south of Queen's Dock basin, respectively. North Bridge Dry Dock (Note: 53.746981°N 0.330007°W North Bridge Dry Dock) and No. 1 Dry Dock (Note: 53.746252°N 0.329402°W No. 1 Dry Dock) were smaller dry docks of around 150 feet (46 m) long and with entrances less than 40 feet (12 m) wide. Both were extended in the latter part of the 19th century. The northernmost of the two docks is a Grade II listed structure. Additionally, the former Queen's Dock basin was converted to an enclosed dock after the main dock was infilled.

=== Quays, wharfs and piers ===
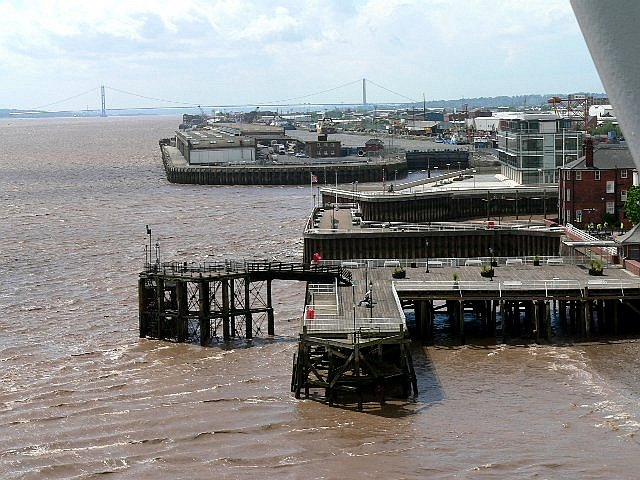
Victoria Pier, Minerva Pier behind, Albert Dock entrance lock and Riverside Quay in distance

In addition to the Riverside Quay at Albert Dock, the former pier at Alexandra Dock, and the roll-on roll-off river terminal at King George Dock, there are other water side berths at the port, both on the Humber and on the River Hull.

The Corporation Jetty (or Old Corporation Pier, also known as Brownlow's Jetty) was between Limekiln Creek and the Humber Dock west pier. (Note: 53.73662°N 0.34006°W Corporation Jetty (or Pier) also known as Brownlow's Jetty. Demolished c. 1860s) The construction of the West Dock necessitated the demolition of the old pier. The Hull and Selby Railway (1840) had a wharf at Limekiln Creek, a small north–south running harbour. This was also used by the Manchester, Sheffield and Lincolnshire Railway (MS&LR) which operated a lighter service from it. (Note: 53.7368°N 0.3424°W Hull and Selby Railway, Limekiln Creek warehouse) The Creek was stopped up as a result of the building of the West Dock in the 1860s. As a provision of the Hull Docks Act 1861 replacement facilities were provided for the railway companies, at a place called Railway Creek. The Railway Creek was constructed as part of the works for the new West Dock (Albert Dock); beginning in 1863, a new harbour was formed east of Limekiln Creek; the Limekiln Creek was kept open until the alternative provision for the NER and MS&LR companies had been made. Following the completion of the works, the small east–west running Railway Creek harbour connected at its east end to the Albert Dock basin. (Note: 53.73718°N 0.34075°W Railway Creek) In 1873, the NER had a warehouse built at the site, designed by Thomas Prosser and modified by Benjamin Burley, both NER architects. (Note: The Railway Creek was filled in c. 1906s. (Ordnance Survey 1:10000 1970))

Corporation Pier, constructed in 1810, was parallel to the mainland but not directly connected to it; it was converted to a T-shaped pier in 1847. It was used as the terminus of the Hull to New Holland ferry, initially run by the MS&LR and later by the LNER and British Rail, until the service ended in 1981 because of the opening of the Humber Bridge. It was renamed Victoria Pier in 1854, (Note: 53.737703°N 0.333852°W Corporation or Victoria Pier) but both names were commonly used. A railway booking office latterly named Hull Victoria Pier was established here c. 1849 by the MS&LR, and closed on 25 June 1981 with the cessation of the ferry service. The pier has been altered several times. A floating pontoon was added in 1877 and removed in 1980; an upper Promenade was added in 1882, and removed in the mid-20th century. As of 2026, the primary wooden structure is L-shaped and, after being closed to the public in 2022, is set to be removed and replaced by Hull City Council due to serious structural deterioration and rot.

To the west of Victoria Pier were the L-shaped piers enclosing the Humber Dock basin, The Humber Dock piers were modified from a diagonal arrangement (NE/SW) to a pier square to the dock (N/S) in around 1840. (Note: See also Ordnance Survey Town Plans 1:1056 c. 1850.) The West Pier became defunct c. 1875 when the entrance basin of the Albert Dock was partially filled to provide more accommodation for the MS&LR, creating Island Wharf. Island Wharf was separated from the mainland by a channel known as Albert Channel which was filled-in during the 1960s. In 2004, construction began on an office development known as Humber Quays on the site. The first building was completed in 2006, a second office building was completed in 2007.

The eastern pier was a wooden structure, from the 1920s known as the 'Minerva Pier'; it was replaced by a steel walled pier in the latter part of the 20th century.

As of 2010, the remaining piers are still used to harbour vessels, but are not used for cargo handling.

The River Hull had extensive staithes, wharfs and warehouses along its length; the Old Harbour could accommodate vessels up to 200 feet (61 m), the river being navigable for vessels up to 180 feet (55 m) for 2 miles (3.2 km). As of 2010, cargo handling has mostly ceased in the Old Harbour. Barges are still used for transportation of vegetable and mineral oils farther upstream within the boundaries of Hull including to J. R. Rix & Sons Ltd, the Croda chemicals vegetable oil chemical processing plant and to the Cargill vegetable oil plant in Stoneferry.

=== Salt End jetties ===
At Salt End, a jetty (No. 1 Oil Jetty) for the importation of bulk mineral oil was constructed in 1914 by the North Eastern and Hull & Barnsley railway companies, connected to a tank farm at Salt End. The jetty was constructed extending 1,500 feet (460 m) into the Humber, giving a water depth of 30 ft (9.1 m) at low spring tides. Chemical industrial development fed by the oil imports would develop into the chemical site at Salt End, now known as BP Saltend.

No. 2 Jetty was constructed in 1928 westward of No. 1, and a reinforced concrete structure, No. 3 Jetty, was built in 1958. The original No. 1 jetty was demolished and replaced with a new structure in 1959. No. 2 jetty was demolished in 1977. As of 2010, both Nos. 1 and 3 jetties remain in use. (Note: 53.72727°N 0.24766°W Salt End jetties (approximate location 2012))

=== Port welfare ===
Seafarers arriving at the port are provided with practical and welfare support via the services of a port chaplain.

== Disasters, accidents and war damage ==
=== Explosion of the PS Union ===
In 1837 the packet steamer Union exploded in the Humber Dock basin, resulting in the death of over twenty people including bystanders on the dock side, and many injuries; the vessel itself sank.

=== R38 airship disaster ===
In 1921, an R38-class airship broke apart while performing a sharp turn near Victoria Pier. It then exploded, and the flaming wreckage crashed into the Humber near the Victoria Pier, killing 45 of the 49 passengers on board.

=== Second World War ===
During the Second World War, the Hull docks were actively targeted. In addition to mines in the Humber, the docks in Hull were bombed. All of them were damaged. The wooden Riverside Quay at Albert Dock was totally destroyed in 1941.

=== Fires ===
Major fires destroyed the fish market at St Andrews Dock in 1929, and a general cargo shed at Humber Dock in 1951. In 1970, a vehicle carrying liquefied gas struck the top of a road subway leading to the William Wright and St Andrew's docks, resulting in a gas explosion and fire. The incident caused two deaths and 17 serious injuries.

=== Acid leak ===
On 18 September 2017, emergency crews attended a large-scale acid leak which had caused a vapour cloud to form over King George Dock. Humberside Fire and Rescue Service warned nearby residents to close doors and windows as a precautionary measure, after a tank containing 580 t (570 long tons; 640 short tons) of hydrochloric acid sprang a leak at the dock late in the day. By the early hours of 19 September 2017, firefighters confirmed that wind was blowing the vapour away from houses near the United Molasses site, where the leak occurred and declared the area near the dock safe.

However, within 24 hours emergency crews had returned to the site following a change in wind direction. A number of emergency service vehicles, including an ambulance could be seen waiting on standby nearby. The acid was later transferred on to tankers to be taken away safely. Eight people reported feeling unwell as a result of the incident. Four were assessed at the scene and discharged immediately and four were taken to hospital for further assessment. All were ultimately discharged after showing no further symptoms. The Environment Agency confirmed that there appeared to be no leakage into the Humber or any other environmental impact.

== See also ==
Museums in Hull with exhibits relevant to the port

- Arctic Corsair
- Hull Maritime Museum
- Spurn Lightship
- Streetlife Museum of Transport
- Lagoon Hull

== Acts and legislation ==
- 14 Geo. 3. c. 56 (1774), Kingston-upon-Hull Dock Act: Creation of the Hull dock company; creation of a dock (later Queen's dock); establishment of a legal quay; other rights and responsibilities.

Hull Market Place and Dock Improvement Act 1801
- Act of Parliament
- Parliament of the United Kingdom
- Long title: An Act for enlarging and improving the Market-Place of the town of Kingston-Upon-Hull, and for making a commodious Street from thence to the river Humber, with a Dock and Wharf or Landing Place for the Ferry and Market Boats belonging and resorting to the said town.
- Citation: 41 Geo. 3. (U.K.) c. lxv
- Territorial extent: United Kingdom

Dates
- Royal assent: 20 June 1801
- Commencement: 20 June 1801

Status: Current legislation

Text of statute as originally enacted

- 41 Geo. 3. (U.K.) c. lxv (1801), An Act for enlarging and improving the Market-Place of the town of Kingston-Upon-Hull, and for making a commodious Street from thence to the river Humber, with a Dock and Wharf or Landing Place for the Ferry and Market Boats belonging and resorting to the said town.: Containing clauses relating to the establishment of a ferry boat dock on land near Humber Street.
- 42 Geo. 3. c. 91 (1802), Kingston-upon-Hull Dock Act: Further docks and basin to be named Humber Dock; a third dock between Myton and Beverley gates (later Junction Dock); transfer of the Garrison Ground excluding the Citadel from the Crown to town.
  - 5 Geo. 4. c. 52 (1824), Kingston-Upon-Hull Dock Act: Amendment of Hull Dock Act of 1802; transfer of part of Garrison Ground from the town of Hull to the Royal Ordnance.
- 45 Geo. 3. c. 42 (1805), Kingston-upon-Hull Dock Act: Raising of additional funds for the construction of the docks mentioned in Hull Dock Act, 1802.
- 7 & 8 Vict. c. 103 (1844), Kingston-upon-Hull Dock Act: A fourth dock with timber pond (later Victoria Dock); and a fifth dock (Railway Dock); plus additional setting out of authorities in the port
- 8 & 9 Vict. c. 5 (1845), Kingston-upon-Hull Dock Act: Enlargement of the Railway dock
- 10 & 11 Vict. c. 283 (1847), Kingston-upon-Hull Dock Act; 12 & 13 Vict. c. 69 (1849), Kingston-upon-Hull Dock Act; 17 & 18 Vict. c. 13 (1854), Kingston-upon-Hull Dock Amendment Act: Clarity as to land purchases; raising of funds; further financial arrangements
- 15 & 16 Vict. c. 136 (1852), Hull Dues Act: Relating to the Hull Dock Company; 15 & 16 Vict. c. 130 (1852), Humber Conservancy Act; 17 & 18 Vict. c. 101 (1854), Kingston-upon-Hull Improvement Act
- 24 & 25 Vict. c. 79 (1861), Hull Docks Act: Construction of a sixth dock (later Albert Dock), and alterations and connections to the Hull and Selby Railway line.
- 27 & 28 Vict. c. 2 (1864), Hull Docks Act: Raising of capital for expansion of Victoria Dock
- 29 & 30 Vict. c. 77 (1866), Hull Docks Act: Enlargement of the western dock; 30 & 31 Vict. c. 25 (31 May 1867), Hull Docks Act: further extension of the western dock
- 43 & 44 Vict. c. 199 (1880), Hull, Barnsley, and West Riding Junction Railway and Dock Act: Construction of a railway and dock (Alexandra Dock)
- 55 & 56 Vict. c. 198 (1893), North Eastern Railway (Hull Docks) Act: Acquisition of the Hull Dock company by the NER
- 62 & 63 Vict. c. 242 (1899), Hull Joint Dock Act; 6 Edw. 7. c. 46 (1906), Hull Joint Dock Act: Construction of a joint dock (later King George Dock) by the NER and H&BR
- British Transport Docks (Hull Docks) 1973 (c.xxviii)
- Associated British Ports (Hull) 1989 (c.x)
- "The Associated British Ports (Hull) Harbour Revision Order 2006". The National Archives. 2006.
