= Spurn Lightship =

British lightvessel

Coordinates: 53°44′26.3″N 000°20′17.39″W

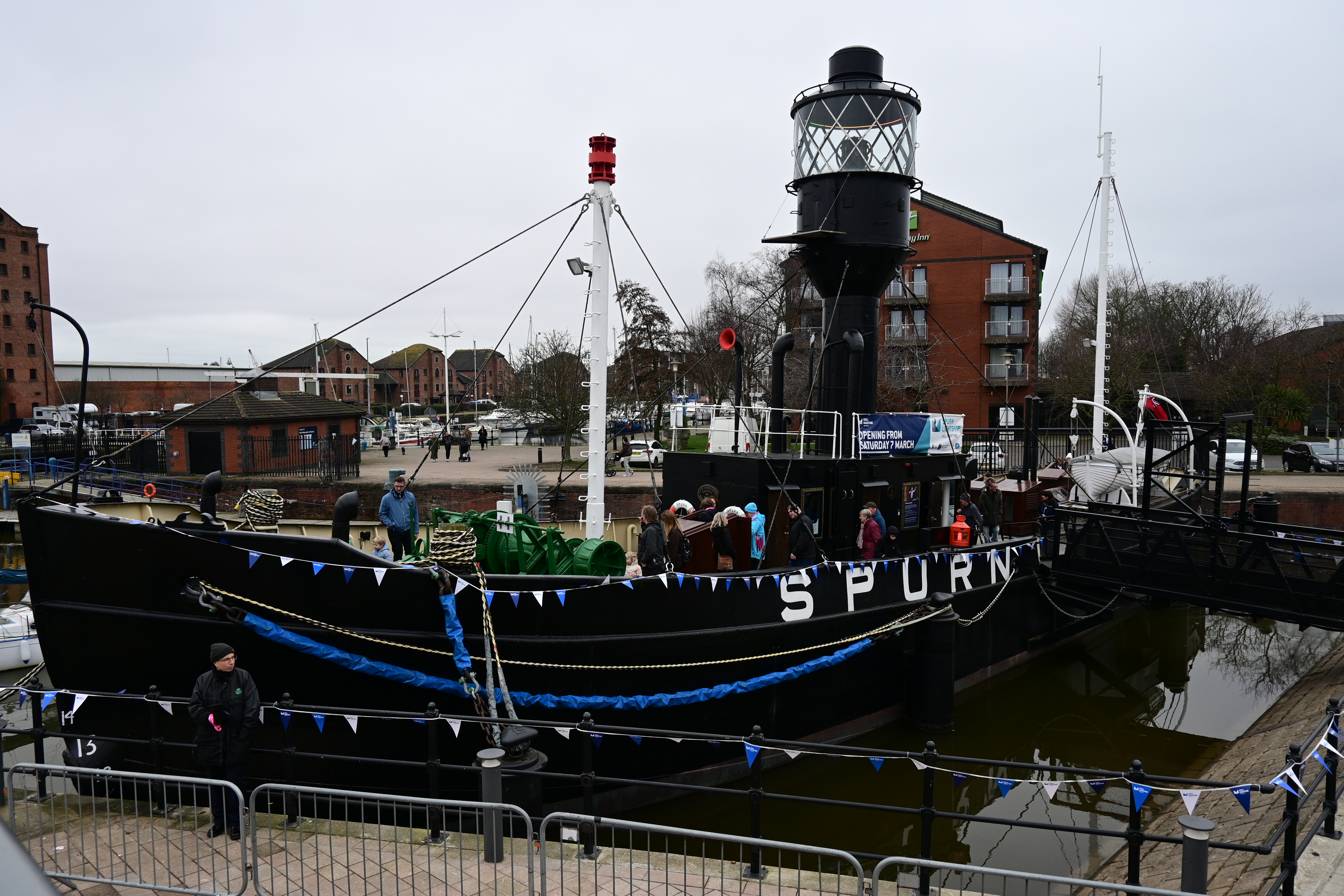
- Spurn docked in Kingston upon Hull, England

History

United Kingdom
- Name: Spurn
- Owner: Hull City Council
- Builder: Goole Shipbuilding and Repairing Co Ltd, Goole
- Launched: 1927
- Completed: 1927
- Out of service: 1975
- Status: Museum ship

General characteristics
- Type: Lightvessel
- Tonnage: 200 GT
- Length: 100 ft (30 m)
- Beam: 24 ft (7.3 m)
- Draught: 10 ft (3.0 m)
- Depth: 14.5 ft (4.4 m)

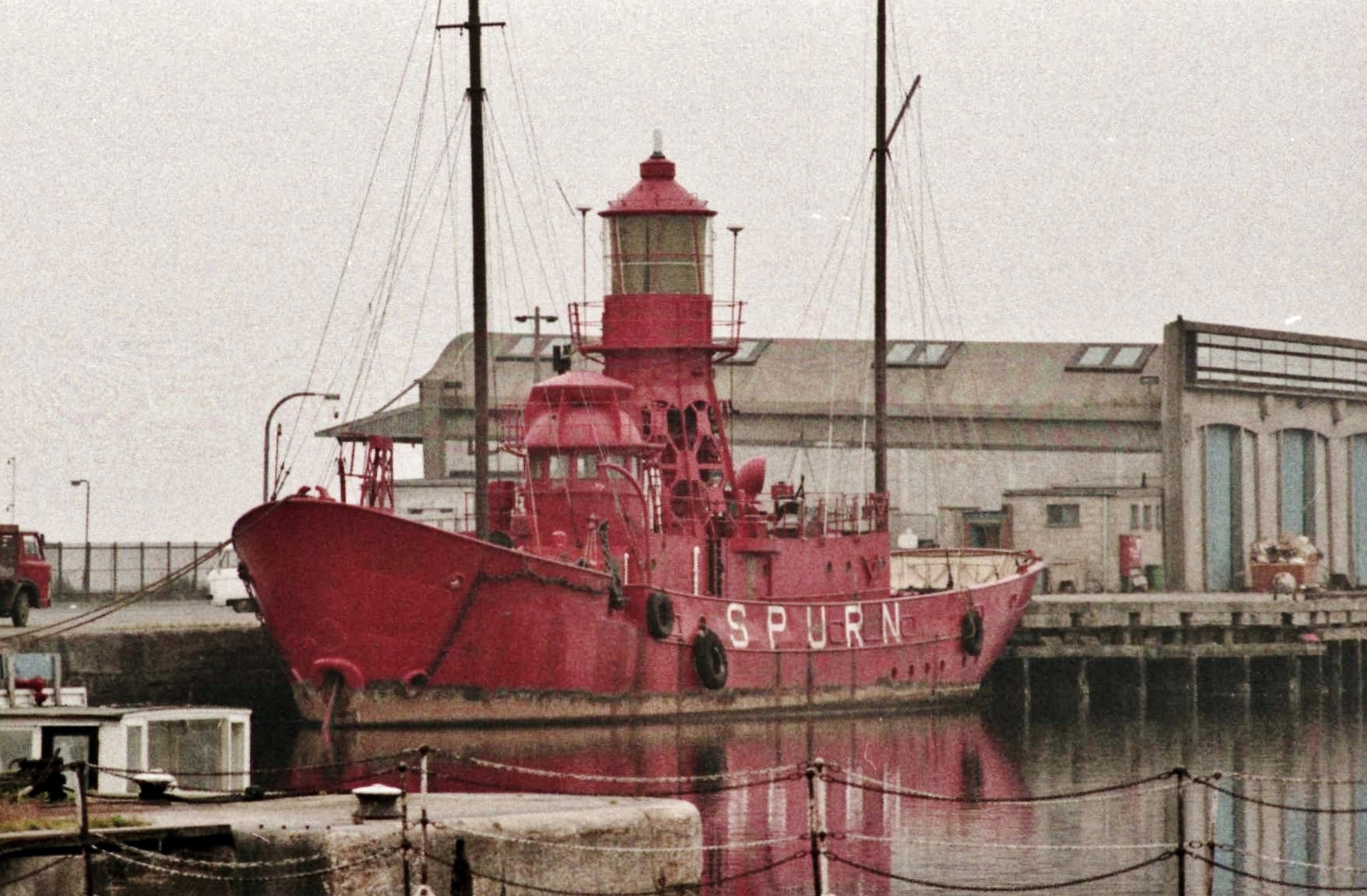
Spurn in Albert Dock in July 1983

The Spurn Lightship (LV No. 12) is a lightvessel (i.e. a ship used as a lighthouse), previously anchored in Hull Marina in the British city of Kingston upon Hull, England. It was relocated to a shipyard in October 2021 for restoration, prior to becoming a display together with the Arctic Corsair.

The ship was built in 1927 and served for 48 years as a navigation aid in the approaches of the Humber Estuary, where it was stationed 4 1/2 miles (7.2 km) east of Spurn Point.

The lightship was decommissioned in 1975 and bought/restored by Hull City Council in 1983 before being moved to Hull Marina as a museum in 1987. The museum closed in June 2018, in preparation for the vessel being relocated in September, to facilitate a footbridge being constructed over the adjacent A63. Initially it was expected that the museum would reopen in 2021 after undergoing conservation work and a relocation to a new position on the marina.

== Restoration ==
The ship was moved to a private shipyard in October 2021 for restoration, having been static for 34 years. Part of a £30 million project, after renovation in a dry dock with completion anticipated for 2023, it will be displayed together with the Arctic Corsair trawler. Following restoration it was returned to the marina on 9 March 2023. It was relocated in February 2024 to a newly constructed mooring in the marina near to Murdoch's Connection footbridge, and following the completion of footpath works leading to the vessel, was reopened to the public on 7 March 2026.
