= Hull Marina =

Marina in Hull, England

Coordinates: 53.739700°N 0.337820°W

Humber Dock Marina

Hull Marina is a marina for pleasure boats situated in the English city of Kingston upon Hull. It was opened in 1983 on the site of the former Railway Dock and Humber Dock and is managed by British Waterways Marinas Limited (BWML).

The marina is home to 270 berths, spread across Humber Dock and Railway Dock, as well as a boat yard serviced by a 50-tonne boat hoist. Access through the lock to the Humber estuary is possible at high water ±3 hours. The basin outside the lock has a "waiting wall" for vessels to tie up to while waiting to enter the lock, although this dries out at low water.

Railway Dock and Humber Dock are separated by a lifting pedestrian bridge, which is lifted to allow access for watercraft.

== Attractions and events ==
The Spurn Lightship moored in the marina acts as a museum. The area immediately around the marina has also played host to the City's Folk & Maritime Festival and Humber Street Sesh.
