= Ulceby Aerodrome Platform railway station =

Former railway station in England

Ulceby Aerodrome Platform
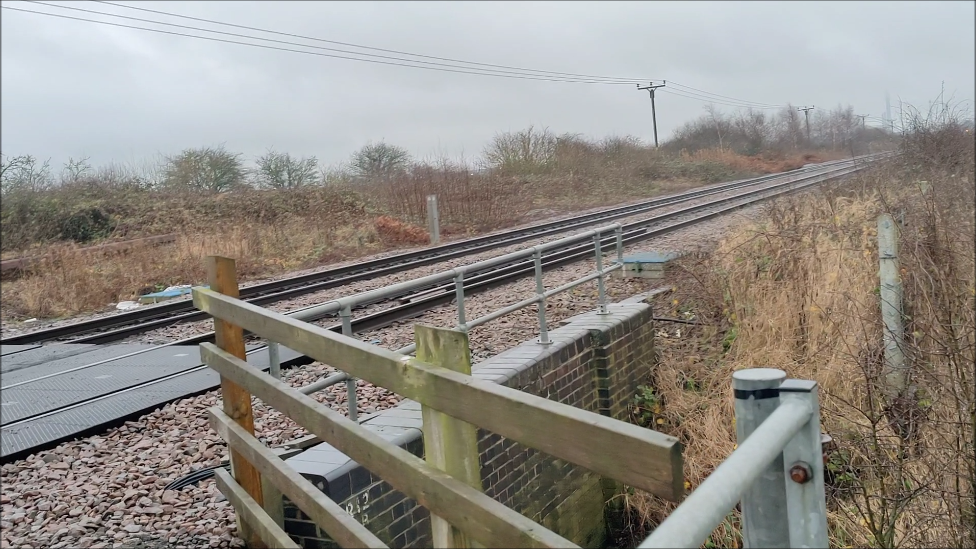

General information
- Location: North Killingholme, North East Lincolnshire; England
- Coordinates: 53.6299°N 0.2895°W
- Grid reference: TA132161
- Platforms: 2 (probable)

Other information
- Status: Disused

History
- Post-grouping: London and North Eastern Railway

Key dates
- by June 1943: Station opened by the LNER
- by June 1947: Station closed
Location

Ulceby Aerodrome Platform railway station was situated 74 chains (1.5 km) northeast of Ulceby North Junction between Ulceby and the village of South Killingholme, Lincolnshire, England. It was opened by LNER to serve the Second World War airfield RAF North Killingholme, whose southern perimeter lay a short distance to the north.

A workman's ticket to the station, issued at Cleethorpes on 26 June 1943, indicates its latest possible opening date. Construction of the airfield started on 23 September 1942; it went on to close operationally on 31 October 1945, being used for some time thereafter for ordnance storage.

The use of the word "Platform" in an LNER station name usually indicated an unstaffed halt.

The line through the station was, and in 2015 remained, the main goods line to and from Immingham Dock. Up to the outbreak of the Second World War the only passenger traffic along the line was occasional ocean liner specials to Immingham Eastern Jetty. Unadvertised workmen's services using the line, plying between Cleethorpes and Immingham Dock via Habrough, are known to have run from at least 1954 to 1963, becoming an advertised service until cessation in 1969. It is not known whether this service started well before 1954 or a special service for Ulceby Aerodrome workers and military personnel was provided for the period the station was open.

By 2015 no trace of the station remained.

Preceding station	Disused railways	Following station
Ulceby; Line closed, station open	London and North Eastern Railway	Immingham Western Jetty; Line and station closed
