= Immingham Dock railway station =

Former railway station in England

Immingham Dock
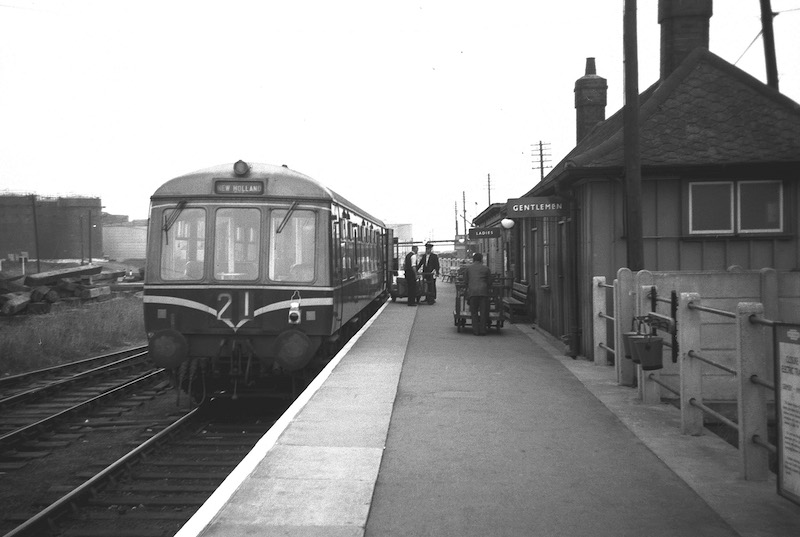
- July 1960

General information
- Location: Immingham, North East Lincolnshire; England
- Coordinates: 53.6313°N 0.1896°W
- Grid reference: TA198164
- Platforms: 1

Other information
- Status: Disused

History
- Original company: Great Central Railway
- Pre-grouping: Great Central Railway
- Post-grouping: London and North Eastern Railway

Key dates
- 17 November 1913: opened
- 17 June 1963: Barton and Immingham Light Railway closed
- 6 October 1969: closed
Location

Immingham Dock railway station served the dock at Immingham, Lincolnshire, England.

== History ==
Immingham Dock was opened on 17 November 1913 by the Great Central Railway at a point where the deep water channel came close to the Lincolnshire bank of the River Humber.

In order to get their workers from Kingston upon Hull, Barton upon Humber, New Holland and surrounding villages to the dock the company built the Barton and Immingham Light Railway, which terminated at the temporary Immingham Western Jetty railway station near to the curving embankment which carried trains up to the Western Jetty itself.

The temporary station lasted for some years. The July 1922 Bradshaw's Guide shows Immingham Western jetty as the line's terminus, whilst a photograph of a locomotive in Great Central livery using the permanent replacement Immingham Dock station suggests the handover took place around 1922. The new station was nearer the dock gates.

Dock workers from the Grimsby direction were catered for by the Grimsby and Immingham Electric Railway, an inter-urban tram system which also terminated at a station named Immingham Dock. Trains and trams at the two stations faced each other from opposite sides of the dock's entrance lock gates

The station had a single curving platform with a run round facility and a small pagoda - style station building which housed the usual facilities. The platform was constructed in wood, later rebuilt with concrete supports. Services were provided from New Holland, leaving what is now the Barton Line south of Goxhill, passing through East Halton and Killingholme stations before reaching Immingham.

The station escaped closure when passenger services were withdrawn from the branch on 17 June 1963 because a service which had been provided since at least 1954 via Ulceby was upgraded from unadvertised workmen's trains to publicly timetabled passenger trains. These ran from Cleethorpes, calling at New Clee, Grimsby Docks and Grimsby Town then non-stop via Habrough, at times coinciding with dock workers' shift changes. This service was withdrawn on 6 October 1969 when the station finally closed.

On 7 October 1967 a RCTS railtour visited the station.

By 2015 no trace of the station remained.

Former Services

Preceding station	Disused railways	Following station
Killingholme	Great Central Railway; Barton and Immingham Light Railway; 1913 - 1963	Terminus
Grimsby Town; Non-stop via Ulceby	British Railways; 1954 - 1969	Terminus
