= Immingham Western Jetty railway station =

Former railway station in England

Immingham Western Jetty

General information
- Location: Immingham, North East Lincolnshire; England
- Coordinates: 53.6317°N 0.1917°W
- Grid reference: TA196165
- Platforms: 1

Other information
- Status: Disused

History
- Original company: Barton and Immingham Light Railway
- Pre-grouping: Great Central Railway

Key dates
- 1 May 1911: Station opened
- 1922: Station replaced by Immingham Dock station
Location

Immingham Western Jetty railway station was the first railway station which served the dock in Immingham, Lincolnshire, England. It was replaced by Immingham Dock.

== History ==
Immingham Dock was opened on 22 July 1912 by the Great Central Railway at a point where the deep water channel came close to the Lincolnshire bank of the Humber.

To get their workers from Kingston-upon-Hull, Barton upon Humber, New Holland, and surrounding villages to the dock the company built the Barton and Immingham Light Railway, which initially terminated at Immingham Western Jetty station, situated next to the ramp carrying lines onto the jetty itself.

Workers coming from Grimsby and surrounds were catered for by the Grimsby and Immingham Electric Railway, an inter-urban tram system running from Grimsby which had its own terminus named Immingham Dock. This stood on the opposite side of the dock's entrance lock gates.

Immingham Western Jetty station had a single platform station built of wood. It had none of the usual facilities. The only structure other than the platform and fence was a wooden ticket collector's hut not dissimilar to those found at modern car parks.

Services were provided from New Holland, leaving what is now the Barton Line south of Goxhill, calling at East Halton and Killingholme stations before reaching Immingham. The July 1922 Bradshaw shows the station still in use.

At some point in or after 1922 the station was closed and replaced by the altogether more solid and permanent Immingham Dock station a short distance southeast, within sight of the dock's entrance locks. A photo of a locomotive at Immingham Dock station in Great Central Railway livery suggests that the handover took place in the early 1920s.

Former Services

Preceding station	Disused railways	Following station
Killingholme; Line and station closed	Great Central Railway; Barton and Immingham Light Railway	Terminus

Preceding station	Disused railways	Following station
Killingholme	Great Central Railway; Barton and Immingham Light Railway	Terminus
