= Thornton Curtis railway station =

Former railway station in Lincolnshire, England

Thornton Curtis

General information
- Location: Thornton Curtis, North Lincolnshire; England
- Coordinates: 53.6476°N 0.3188°W
- Grid reference: TA112181
- Platforms: 2 (probable)

Other information
- Status: Disused

History
- Original company: Manchester, Sheffield and Lincolnshire Railway

Key dates
- by June 1848: Station opened
- by November 1848: Station closed, to be replaced by Thornton Abbey station
Location

Thornton Curtis railway station was a temporary structure provided by the Manchester, Sheffield and Lincolnshire Railway until it opened Thornton Abbey station 42 chains (840 m) to the north.

The station was situated south west of College Farm in what in 2015 was still open country with no road access. The line through the station opened on 2 April 1848, with Thornton Curtis opening "a little later". It appeared in Bradshaw from June to November 1848 inclusive. The station's permanent successor first appeared in Bradshaw in August 1849.

By 2015 the only suggestion that a station might ever have existed at the site was a slight widening of the cutting.

Preceding station	Disused railways	Following station
Goxhill; Line and station open	Manchester, Sheffield and Lincolnshire Railway; Barton line	Ulceby; Line and station open
