= South Humberside Main Line =

Railway line in the UK

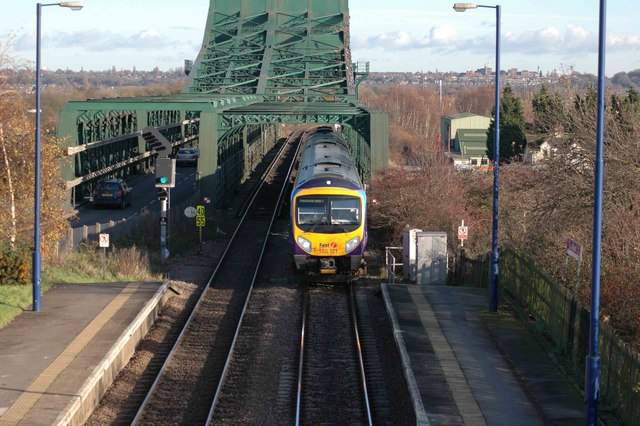
- SHML crosses the River Trent at Keadby Bridge

Overview
- Status: Operational
- Owner: Network Rail
- Locale: Yorkshire and the Humber
- Termini: Cleethorpes; Doncaster

Service
- Type: Heavy rail
- System: National Rail
- Operator(s): TransPennine Express; East Midlands Railway; Northern Trains

Technical
- Number of tracks: Mostly Double Track, with a Single Track section between Grimsby Town and Cleethorpes.
- Track gauge: 4 ft 8 1/2 in (1,435 mm) standard gauge
Route map
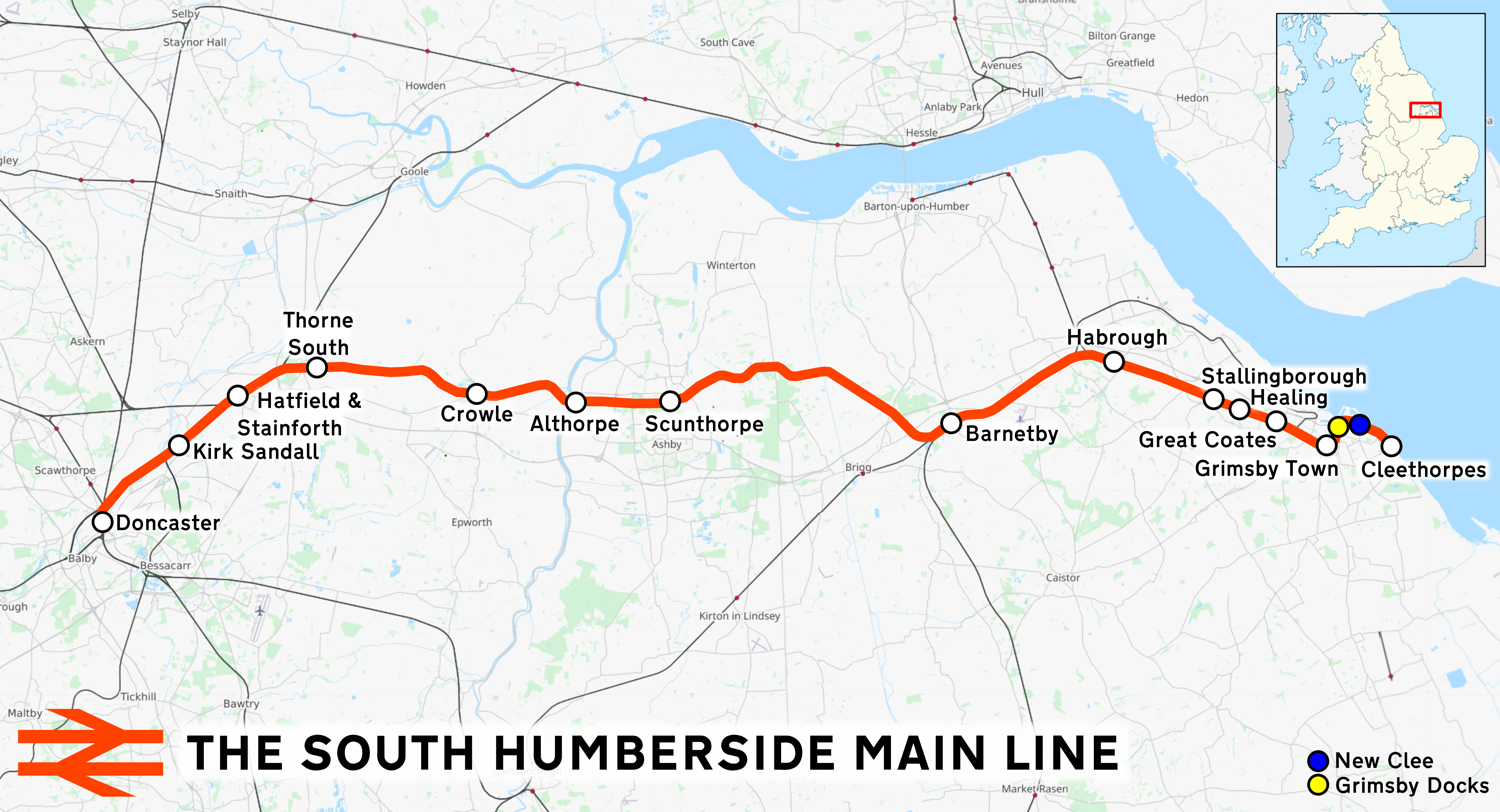
(Click to expand)

The South Humberside Main Line runs from Doncaster on the East Coast Main Line to Thorne where it diverges from the Sheffield to Hull Line. It then runs eastwards to Scunthorpe and the Humber ports of Immingham and Grimsby, with the coastal resort of Cleethorpes as terminus.

== Route ==
From Doncaster the line forms a joint route with the Sheffield–Hull line to Hatfield, passing Hatfield Colliery where the lines diverge at Thorne Junction. The line runs across Thorne and Hatfield Moors to run along the Stainforth and Keadby Canal toward the River Trent. Close to Keadby Power Station the route turns around Keadby and crosses the river Trent at Keadby Bridge. The line then climbs and passes over the M181 motorway and on viaduct to cross the Lincoln Edge at Scunthorpe. Through Scunthorpe, the line passes through the steelworks into the Ancholme Valley before crossing under the M180 motorway. To the west of Barnetby the line branches further at Wrawby Junction with the Grimsby–Lincoln–Newark line turning south towards Market Rasen, and the Kirton Lindsey line, (formerly a continuation of the Sheffield to Lincoln Line). After Barnetby railway station the line crosses the Lincolnshire Wolds passing quarries at Melton Ross and passes close to Humberside Airport near to where it diverges with the Barton Line and a branch which serves Immingham Docks close to Ulceby. The main line continues to Grimsby roughly parallel with the A180 road though Habrough railway station, Stallingborough railway station, Great Coates railway station to Grimsby railway station. The route then passes Grimsby Docks railway station which is open only during daylight hours, towards Grimsby Docks, and then on to New Clee railway station running along the humber bank/sea wall to Cleethorpes railway station.

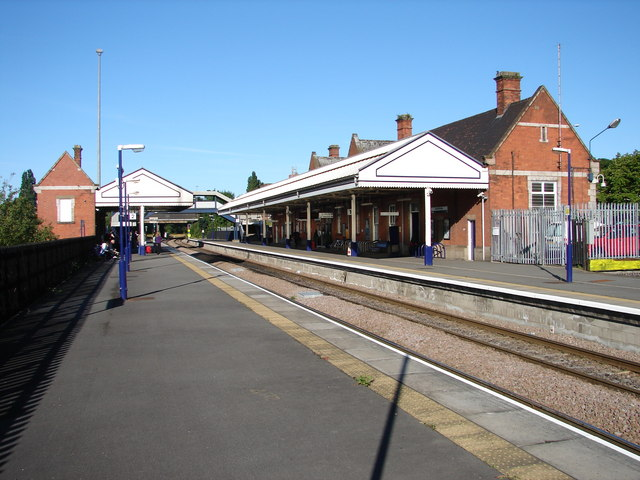
Scunthorpe Railway Station

== Passenger services ==
The population in station catchments of the line is 470,000.

The East Midlands Railway service between Cleethorpes and Barton on Humber uses the line until taking the Barton Line branch.

Northern operate a service between Scunthorpe and Sheffield, calling at intermediate stations.

The Barton Line forms a branch to this line from Ulceby Junction, to Barton upon Humber. Passenger services on the line were provided by EMR.

=== Service patterns ===
- One train per hour Northern Rail, Sheffield-Doncaster-Scunthorpe.
- One train per hour TransPennine Express service, Liverpool Lime Street–Doncaster–Cleethorpes.
- One train per two hours East Midlands service, Barton-on-Humber–Cleethorpes.
- One train per two hours East Midlands service, Nottingham–Lincoln–Grimsby Town.

== Freight ==
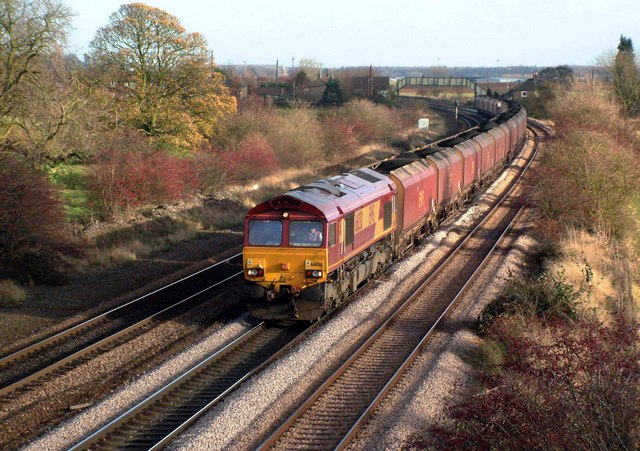
Imported Coal transported from Immingham passes through Melton Ross

The South Humberside Main Line is one of eight national Seven Day Railway Routes, which target the routes with the strongest business case for investment. The port of Immingham is located at the end of the South Humberside Main Line from Doncaster. This generates around one fifth of the total UK freight tonnage with potential for significantly more. This line is therefore a very important route for freight and extra capacity is needed to allow rail to grow with the port. Humber International Terminal stage 2 was completed in 2006 which has doubled the amount of coal the port can handle.

The route from Doncaster to Immingham via Scunthorpe is a key artery for rail freight services conveying approximately 20% of the total rail freight volume moved in the UK, it includes:

- Steel to/from Scunthorpe Steelworks which is normally 10 trains per day
- Waste to Scunthorpe Roxby Gullet which is normally 6 trains per day
- Coal from Immingham to various Power Stations in the Aire and Trent Valley which is normally 40 trains per day
- Petroleum from Humber and Lindsey Oil Refineries which is normally 8 trains per day
- Petrochemical traffic from Immingham to Preston and Stalybridge which is normally 2 trains per day
- Steel from Immingham to Avesta Works Sheffield (Outokumpu) which is normally 2 trains per day*

Services on the Doncaster to Goole/Hull via Thorne line, which normally amount to eight trains per day, are also affected by these trains.

Totals: 68 freight trains per day, journey each way = 136 paths

There are three tracks between Brocklesby and Wrawby, two in the Doncaster direction and one in the Immingham direction. The line speed also restricts capacity, between Ulceby and Doncaster the line speed is predominantly 55 mph, with Wrawby Junction only 30 mph. The line speed between Immingham and Ulceby is mainly 30 mph. Loaded freight trains generally run at 60 mph on other lines, with some modern unloaded trains being capable of 75 mph.

== History ==
The line was initially part of the Manchester, Sheffield and Lincolnshire Railway until the company changed name to the Great Central Railway in 1897. In 1916 the section of route between Wrawby and Brocklesby was quadrupled to cope with the growing amount of freight traffic heading for the docks at Immingham and Grimsby.

In 1985, the section between Grimsby and Cleethorpes was singled and Fish Dock Road and Cleethorpes signal boxes were closed, as control fell under Pasture Street with its new NX panel.

In September 1993, Pasture Street gained control of the line west up to Marsh Junction when Garden Street, Wellowgate, Friargate and Littlefield Lane were closed.

In April 2019, a level crossing over the line at Suggitt's Lane in Cleethorpes was closed due to safety concerns. In 2022, Suggitt's Lane Bridge was opened, replacing the level crossing.

=== Incidents ===
- In February 2013, a spoil heap (from the now closed Hatfield Colliery) that was weakened by rainfall, caused a landslip and pushed the lines and trackbed up into the air. The line was closed for five months, with trains being diverted through Brigg and Market Rasen before it was re-opened in July 2013.
- 7 August 2015 a freight train derailed at Foreign Ore junction, Santon near Scunthorpe closing the line. A train previously derailed in this area in 2008.
