= East Halton railway station =

Former railway station in Lincolnshire, England

East Halton
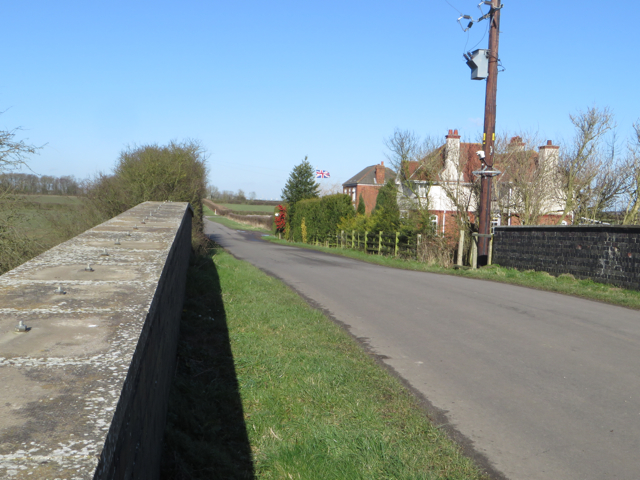

General information
- Location: East Halton, North East Lincolnshire; England
- Coordinates: 53.6691°N 0.2752°W
- Grid reference: TA140205
- Platforms: 2

Other information
- Status: Disused

History
- Original company: Barton and Immingham Light Railway
- Pre-grouping: Great Central Railway
- Post-grouping: London and North Eastern Railway

Key dates
- 1 May 1911: Station opened
- July 1956: Station became an unstaffed halt
- 17 June 1963: Station closed
Location

East Halton railway station was located on Skitter Road north of East Halton, Lincolnshire, England.

The station was built by the Barton and Immingham Light Railway under the auspices of the Great Central Railway. The line's primary purpose was to enable workers to get to and from Immingham Dock which was being built at the time the line was opened. The typical journey time to the dock was fifteen minutes.

The station was the only one on the line built with two brick faced platforms, though the second track and platform were removed in later years. In 1954 the platform facilities consisted of a seat, a corrugated iron shelter a station sign reading East Halton Halt and two lamps.

Shortly after closure the track was lifted for about 100 yards from the junction at Goxhill, leaving the line through the station as a long siding which was sometimes used to store redundant wagons. Some time later the track was lifted through the station almost to Killingholme Admiralty Platform. In 2015 the line of route was still plain to see.

Preceding station	Disused railways	Following station
Goxhill; Line closed, station open	Great Central Railway; Barton and Immingham Light Railway	Killingholme Admiralty Platform; Line and station closed
