= Thornton Abbey railway station =

Railway station in North Lincolnshire, England

Thornton Abbey
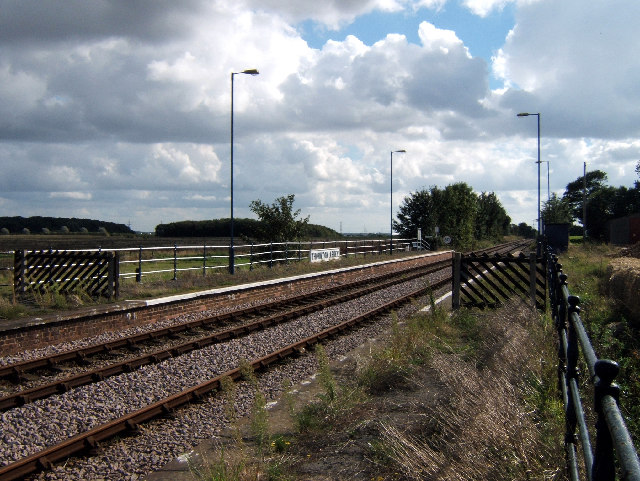

General information
- Location: Thornton Abbey, North Lincolnshire; England
- Coordinates: 53.6545°N 0.3231°W
- Grid reference: TA109188
- Manager: East Midlands Railway
- Platforms: 2

Other information
- Station code: TNA

History
- Original company: Great Grimsby and Sheffield Junction Railway
- Pre-grouping: Great Central Railway
- Post-grouping: LNER

Key dates
- August 1849: opened

Passengers
- 2021/22: ▲754
- 2022/23: ▲1,134
- 2023/24: ▼946
- 2024/25: ▼724
- 2025/26: ▲742
Location
Notes
- Passenger statistics from the Office of Rail and Road

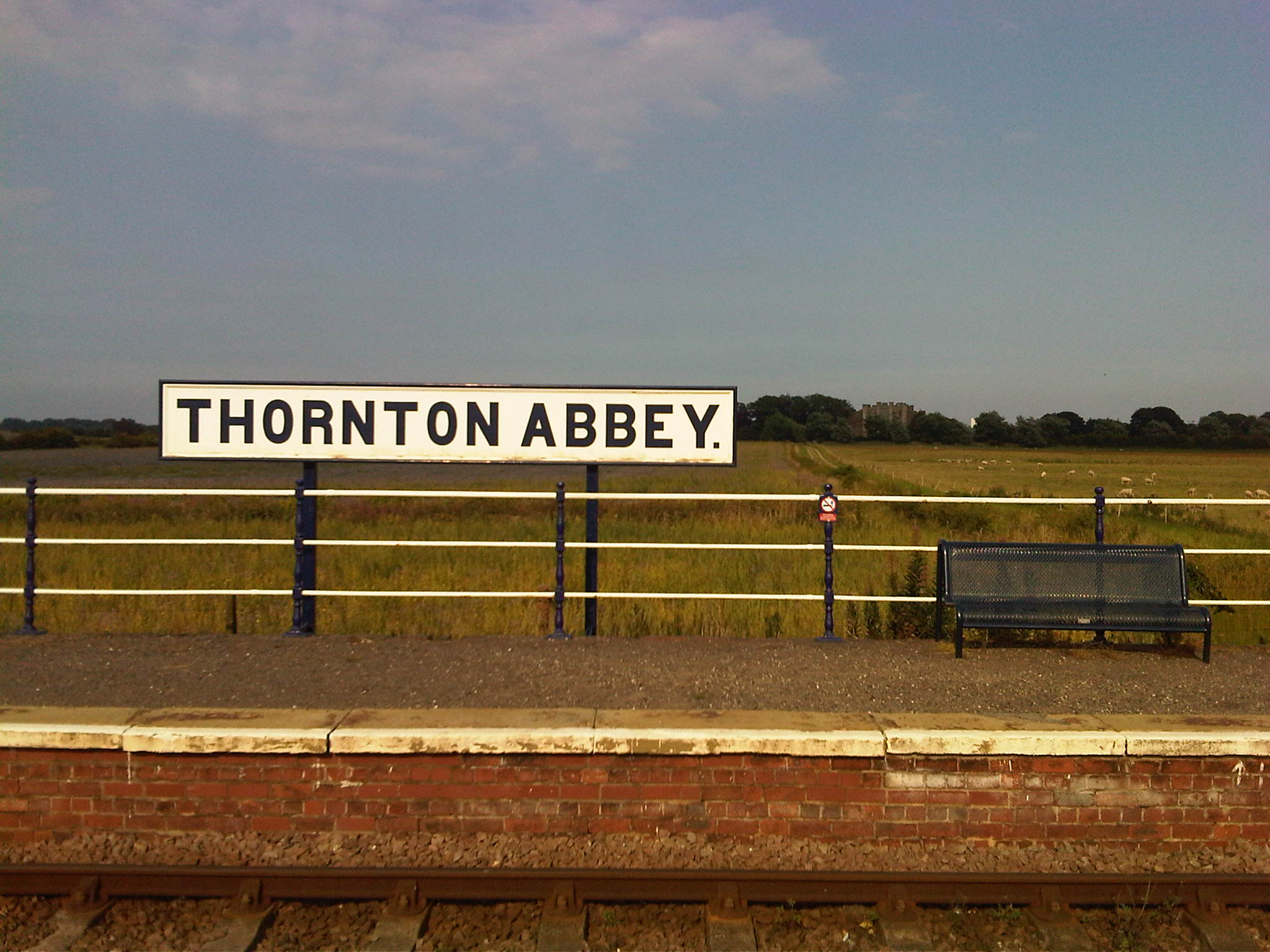
Station with Thornton Abbey gatehouse visible in background.

Thornton Abbey railway station is close to the site of Thornton Abbey in North Lincolnshire, England.

It was built by the Great Grimsby and Sheffield Junction Railway in 1849, replacing a temporary one at Thornton Curtis. It also serves the village of Thornton Curtis and is managed by East Midlands Railway.

== Services ==
All services at Thornton Abbey are operated by East Midlands Railway using Class 170 DMUs.

The typical off-peak service is one train every two hours in each direction between Cleethorpes and Barton-on-Humber.

On Sundays, the station is served by four trains per day in each direction during the summer months only. No services call at the station on Sundays during the winter months.

Preceding station	National Rail	Following station
Goxhill	East Midlands Railway Barton Line	Ulceby
