= Healing railway station =

Railway station in Lincolnshire, England

Healing
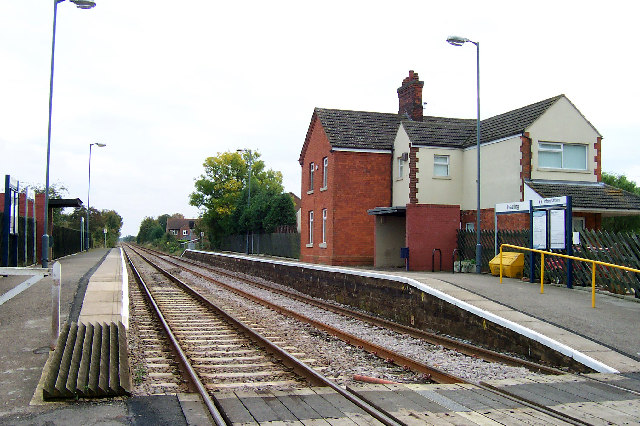

General information
- Location: Healing, North East Lincolnshire; England
- Coordinates: 53.5819°N 0.1604°W
- Grid reference: TA218110
- Manager: East Midlands Railway
- Platforms: 2

Other information
- Station code: HLI
- Classification: DfT category F2

History
- Original company: Manchester, Sheffield and Lincolnshire Railway
- Pre-grouping: Great Central Railway
- Post-grouping: LNER

Key dates
- 1 April 1881: Station opened

Passengers
- 2021/22: ▲4,808
- 2022/23: ▲5,932
- 2023/24: ▲7,048
- 2024/25: ▼6,680
- 2025/26: ▲7,558
Location
Notes
- Passenger statistics from the Office of Rail and Road

Healing railway station serves the village of Healing in North East Lincolnshire, England. It was opened on 1 April 1881 by the Manchester, Sheffield and Lincolnshire Railway. The station, and all trains serving it, are operated by East Midlands Railway.

== Services ==
All services at Healing are operated by East Midlands Railway using Class 170 DMUs.

The typical off-peak service is one train every two hours in each direction between Cleethorpes and Barton-on-Humber.

On Sundays, the station is served by four trains per day in each direction during the summer months only. No services call at the station on Sundays during the winter months.

Preceding station	National Rail	Following station
Stallingborough	East Midlands Railway Barton Line	Great Coates
