= Great Coates railway station =

Railway station in Lincolnshire, England

Great Coates
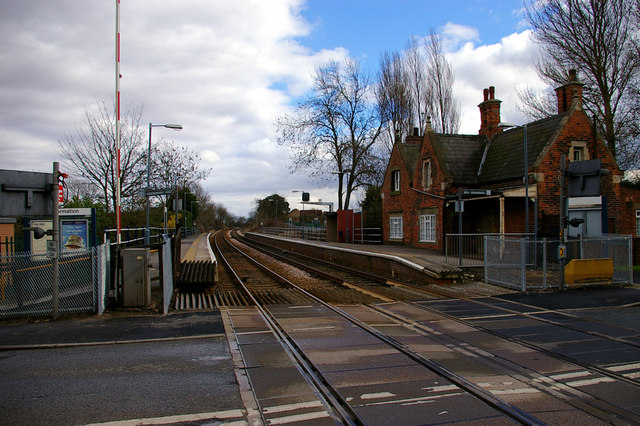

General information
- Location: Great Coates, North East Lincolnshire; England
- Coordinates: 53.57581°N 0.13007°W
- Grid reference: TA239104
- Manager: East Midlands Railway
- Platforms: 2

Other information
- Station code: GCT
- Classification: DfT category F2

History
- Original company: Great Grimsby and Sheffield Junction Railway
- Pre-grouping: Great Central Railway
- Post-grouping: LNER

Key dates
- 1 March 1848: opened

Passengers
- 2021/22: ▲4,606
- 2022/23: ▼4,438
- 2023/24: ▲5,350
- 2024/25: ▲6,340
- 2025/26: ▲7,016
Location
Notes
- Passenger statistics from the Office of Rail and Road

Great Coates railway station serves the village of Great Coates in North East Lincolnshire, England. It was built by the Great Grimsby and Sheffield Junction Railway in 1848. The station, and all trains serving it, are operated by East Midlands Railway.

== Services ==
All services at Great Coates are operated by East Midlands Railway using Class 170 DMUs.

The typical off-peak service is one train every two hours in each direction between Cleethorpes and Barton-on-Humber.

On Sundays, the station is served by four trains per day in each direction during the summer months only. No services call at the station on Sundays during the winter months.

Preceding station	National Rail	Following station
Healing	East Midlands Railway Barton Line	Grimsby Town
