= Suggitt's Lane Bridge =

- Coordinates: 53.5681°N 0.0384°W
- Crosses: South Humberside Main Line
- Locale: Cleethorpes
- Owner: North East Lincolnshire Council

Characteristics
- Total length: 11 metres (36 ft)

History
- Opened: 18 March 2022

Suggitt's Lane Bridge is a footbridge in Cleethorpes that crosses the South Humberside Main Line. It opened in 2022 and replaced a level crossing.

== Background ==
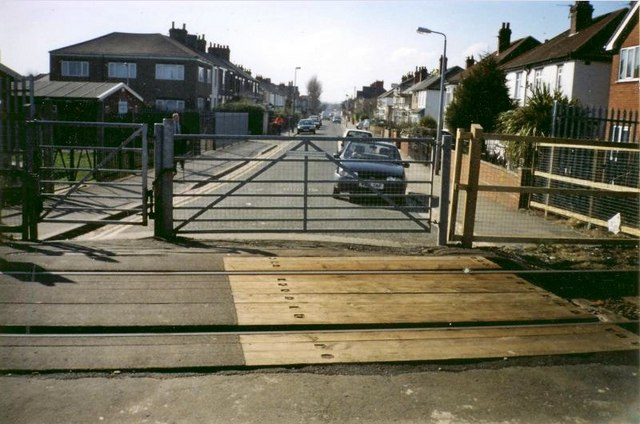
The former Suggitt's Lane level crossing

Suggitt's Lane level crossing was closed by Network Rail in April 2019 due to safety concerns following fifteen near misses in ten years. The company cited both intentional and unintentional misuse. In June 2019, Boris Johnson pledged to reopen the level crossing if he became prime minister. Following the closure, Network Rail stated that the level crossing could not be reopened and that it had entered into discussions with local councillors on how an alternative crossing could be created. On 14 October 2020 while being questioned in parliament, Johnson announced that a replacement bridge had been given the go-ahead.

The design of the bridge was revealed in March 2021.

== Funding ==
The bridge cost £3.6 million, with Network Rail providing £2 million and the Department for Transport providing £1.6 million. North East Lincolnshire Council own the bridge and are responsible for its maintenance.

== Construction ==
Construction began in June 2021. The bridge had been expected to be completed before Christmas, but was delayed due to strong winds during Storm Arwen and Storm Barra which prevented the safe operation of a crane. The bridge opened on 18 March 2022.

== Specification ==
The bridge deck is 11 metres (36 feet) long, and allows enough space for the line between Grimsby and Cleethorpes be re-doubled. It is accessible on both sides via stairs or ramps. It is lit and covered by CCTV.
