= Killingholme railway station =

Former railway station in Scotland

Killingholme
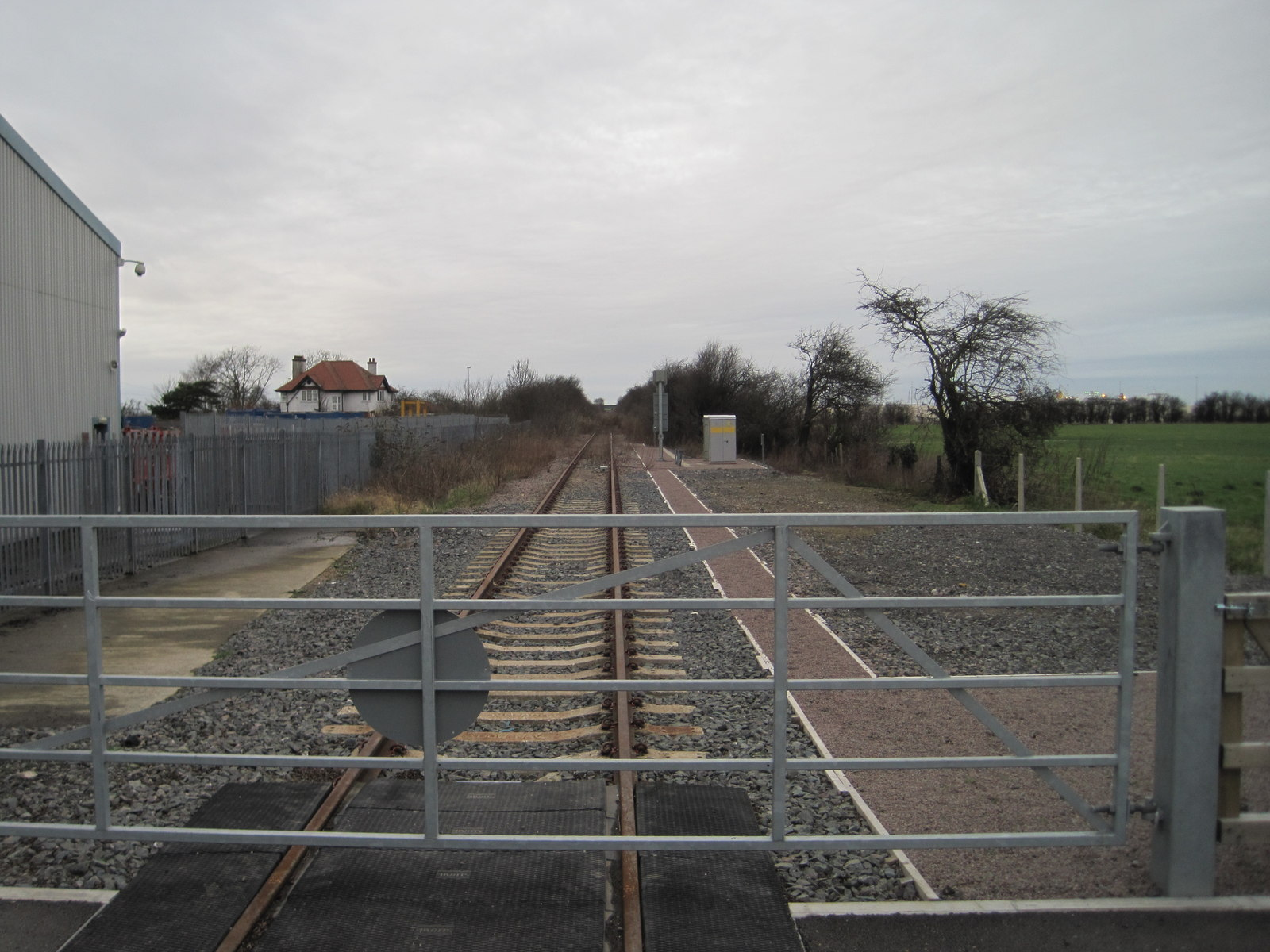

General information
- Location: North and South Killingholme, North East Lincolnshire; England
- Coordinates: 53.6482°N 0.2255°W
- Grid reference: TA173183
- Platforms: 1

Other information
- Status: Disused

History
- Original company: Barton and Immingham Light Railway
- Pre-grouping: Great Central Railway
- Post-grouping: London and North Eastern Railway

Key dates
- 1 May 1911: Station opened
- July 1956: Station became an unstaffed halt
- 17 June 1963: Station closed to passengers
- 4 January 1965: Station closed completely
Location

Killingholme railway station was located on Killingholme Marsh in the parish of South Killingholme, Lincolnshire, England, equidistant from the villages of North and South Killingholme.

The station was built by the Barton and Immingham Light Railway under the auspices of the Great Central Railway. The line's primary purpose was to enable workers to get to and from Immingham Dock which was being built at the time the line was opened. The typical journey time to the dock was six minutes.

The station had a single straight wooden platform bearing a small wooden station building with minimal facilities. Early maps show that the station was situated on a passing loop, but no second platform was ever built.

When the line and station were built the area was rural and very thinly populated. By 2015 the area had become industrial but remained thinly populated. A single track still ran through the site, now carrying modern produce.

On 7 October 1967 a RCTS railtour passed through the station.

Preceding station	Disused railways	Following station
Killingholme Admiralty Platform; Line and station closed	Great Central Railway; Barton and Immingham Light Railway	Immingham Western Jetty; Line and station closed 1911-about 1922
Killingholme Admiralty Platform; Line and station closed	Great Central Railway; Barton and Immingham Light Railway	Immingham Dock; Line and station closed About 1922-1963
