= Stallingborough railway station =

Railway station in Lincolnshire, England

Stallingborough
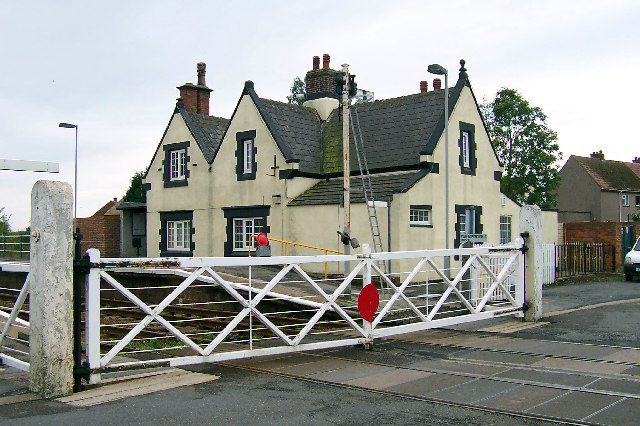

General information
- Location: Stallingborough, North East Lincolnshire; England
- Coordinates: 53.58713°N 0.18357°W
- Grid reference: TA203115
- Manager: East Midlands Railway
- Platforms: 2

Other information
- Station code: SLL
- Classification: DfT category F2

History
- Original company: Great Grimsby and Sheffield Junction Railway
- Pre-grouping: Great Central Railway
- Post-grouping: LNER

Key dates
- 1 March 1848: opened

Passengers
- 2021/22: ▲4,306
- 2022/23: ▼4,268
- 2023/24: ▲5,342
- 2024/25: ▲6,166
- 2025/26: ▼6,018
Location
Notes
- Passenger statistics from the Office of Rail and Road

Stallingborough railway station serves the village of Stallingborough in North East Lincolnshire, England. It was built by the Great Grimsby and Sheffield Junction Railway in 1848.

The station, and all trains serving it, are operated by East Midlands Railway. The manually operated level crossing gates seen in the photo and the wooden Great Central Railway signal box that operated them have both since been replaced by a modern brick structure and lifting barriers respectively - the new signal box is on northside of the line, and is one of a few little boxes to be built in recent years. The station building is a private house now, but there are shelters on both platforms.

== Services ==
All services at Stallingborough are operated by East Midlands Railway using Class 170 DMUs.

The typical off-peak service is one train every two hours in each direction between Cleethorpes and Barton-on-Humber.

On Sundays, the station is served by four trains per day in each direction during the summer months only. No services call at the station on Sundays during the winter months.

Preceding station	National Rail	Following station
Habrough	East Midlands Railway Barton Line	Healing
