= Goxhill railway station =

Railway station in Lincolnshire, England

Goxhill
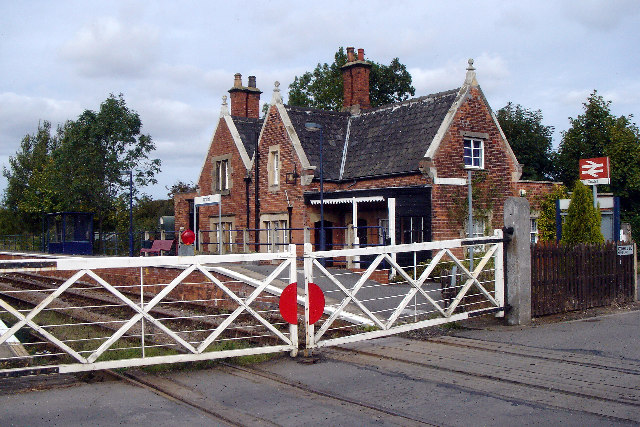

General information
- Location: Goxhill, North Lincolnshire; England
- Coordinates: 53.67668°N 0.33734°W
- Grid reference: TA099213
- Manager: East Midlands Railway
- Platforms: 2

Other information
- Station code: GOX
- Classification: DfT category F2

History
- Original company: Great Grimsby and Sheffield Junction Railway
- Pre-grouping: Great Central Railway
- Post-grouping: LNER

Key dates
- 1 March 1848: opened

Passengers
- 2021/22: ▲7,728
- 2022/23: ▲9,828
- 2023/24: ▲10,360
- 2024/25: ▲10,864
- 2025/26: ▲11,040
Location
Notes
- Passenger statistics from the Office of Rail and Road

Goxhill railway station serves the village of Goxhill in North Lincolnshire, England. It was built by the Great Grimsby and Sheffield Junction Railway in 1848. The station is on the Barton Line 17 miles (27 km) north west of Cleethorpes and all trains serving it are operated by East Midlands Railway.

It is the last station, when travelling from Cleethorpes towards Barton, to still have two platforms and the original station buildings. The buildings are no longer in railway use (the station has been unstaffed since 1969) and are in private ownership. The station signal box controls a nearby level crossing that still (as of summer 2016) has manually-wound wooden gates rather than modern lifting barriers. Since the main line was re-signalled in January 2016, the box has become the 'fringe' on this route to the York Rail Operating Centre.

Between 1911 and 1963, it was also the junction for the Barton & Immingham Light Railway line to Immingham Dock via Killingholme. This route was single line throughout and left the present route just south of the station.

== Facilities ==
The station is unstaffed and has only basic amenities – a single shelter on the southbound platform, a payphone and timetable poster boards on each side. Tickets must be purchased prior to travel or on the train. Step-free access is available to each side via the level crossing.

Goxhill Station was notable for being the last operational British Rail railway station to retain original Eastern Region of British Railways enamelled "totem" signs on the platform lamp-posts – one or two of these were dark-reddish/maroon rather than Eastern Region ultramarine dark blue, the reason for this being unclear. These totems were finally replaced with more modern-style signage towards the end of 1988.

== Services ==
All services at Goxhill are operated by East Midlands Railway using Class 170 DMUs.

The typical off-peak service is one train every two hours in each direction between Cleethorpes and Barton-on-Humber.

On Sundays, the station is served by four trains per day in each direction during the summer months only. No services call at the station on Sundays during the winter months.

Preceding station	National Rail	Following station
New Holland	East Midlands Railway Barton Line	Thornton Abbey
Historical railways
New Holland Town Line and station closed	Great Central Railway Barton and Immingham Light Railway	East Halton Line and station closed
New Holland Town Line and station closed	Great Central Railway Great Grimsby and Sheffield Junction Railway	Thornton Abbey Line and station open
