= Ulceby railway station =

Railway station in North Lincolnshire, England

Ulceby
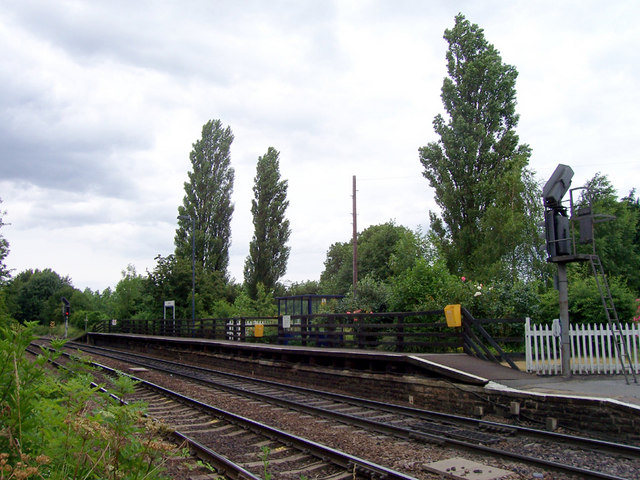

General information
- Location: Ulceby, North Lincolnshire; England
- Coordinates: 53.61930°N 0.30079°W
- Grid reference: TA124149
- Manager: East Midlands Railway
- Platforms: 1

Other information
- Station code: ULC
- Classification: DfT category F2

History
- Original company: Great Grimsby and Sheffield Junction Railway
- Pre-grouping: Great Central Railway
- Post-grouping: LNER

Key dates
- 1 March 1848: opened

Passengers
- 2021/22: ▲2,720
- 2022/23: ▲2,860
- 2023/24: ▲3,212
- 2024/25: ▲4,480
- 2025/26: ▼3,732
Location
Notes
- Passenger statistics from the Office of Rail and Road

Ulceby railway station serves the village of Ulceby in North East Lincolnshire, England. It was built by the Great Grimsby and Sheffield Junction Railway in 1848 and is located at Ulceby Skitter.

It is managed by East Midlands Railway and served by its trains on the Barton line between Cleethorpes and Barton-on-Humber.

The station layout is somewhat unusual in that all passenger trains use a single platform, even though the station is located on a double track line. There are junctions at either end of the station, as the branch line from Habrough to Barton-on-Humber meets and then diverges from the busy freight-only line from Brocklesby to Immingham Dock. These junctions, and the adjacent level crossing were controlled from Ulceby Junction signal box at the southern end of the station, however this was demolished in January 2016 when the crossing and signals were automated. The station originally had two platforms, but this was reduced to a single wooden platform when the line was resignalled in the 1980s.

== Services ==
All services at Ulceby are operated by East Midlands Railway using Class 170 DMUs.

The typical off-peak service is one train every two hours in each direction between Cleethorpes and Barton-on-Humber.

On Sundays, the station is served by four trains per day in each direction during the summer months only. No services call at the station on Sundays during the winter months.

Preceding station	National Rail	Following station
Thornton Abbey	East Midlands Railway Barton Line	Habrough
Historical railways
Brocklesby Line open, station closed	Great Central Railway Barton and Immingham Light Railway	Immingham Dock Line open, station closed
