= Killingholme Admiralty Platform railway station =

Former railway station in England

Killingholme Admiralty Platform
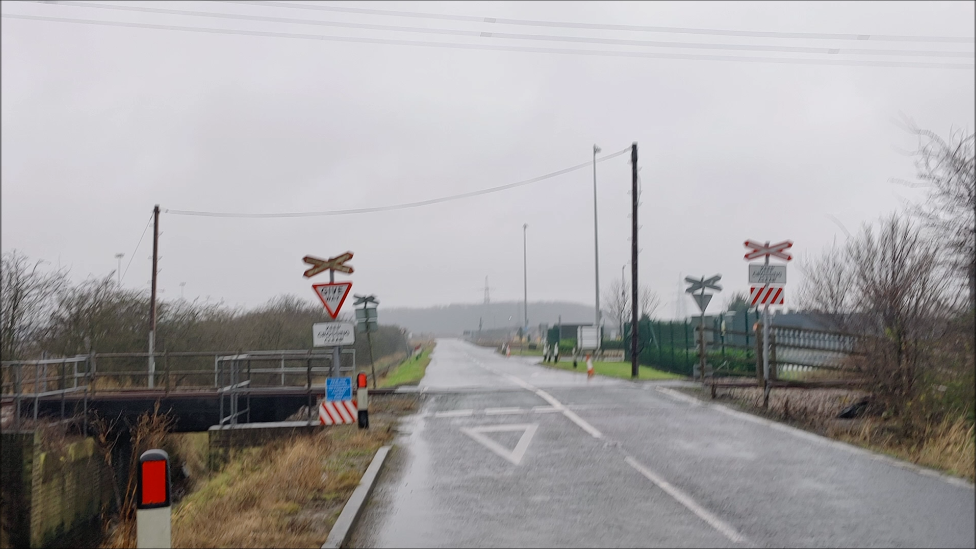

General information
- Location: North Killingholme, North East Lincolnshire; England
- Coordinates: 53.6648°N 0.2475°W
- Grid reference: TA158201
- Platforms: 1

Other information
- Status: Disused

History
- Pre-grouping: Great Central Railway
- Post-grouping: London and North Eastern Railway

Key dates
- 17 March 1913: opened
- 17 June 1963: Station closed
Location

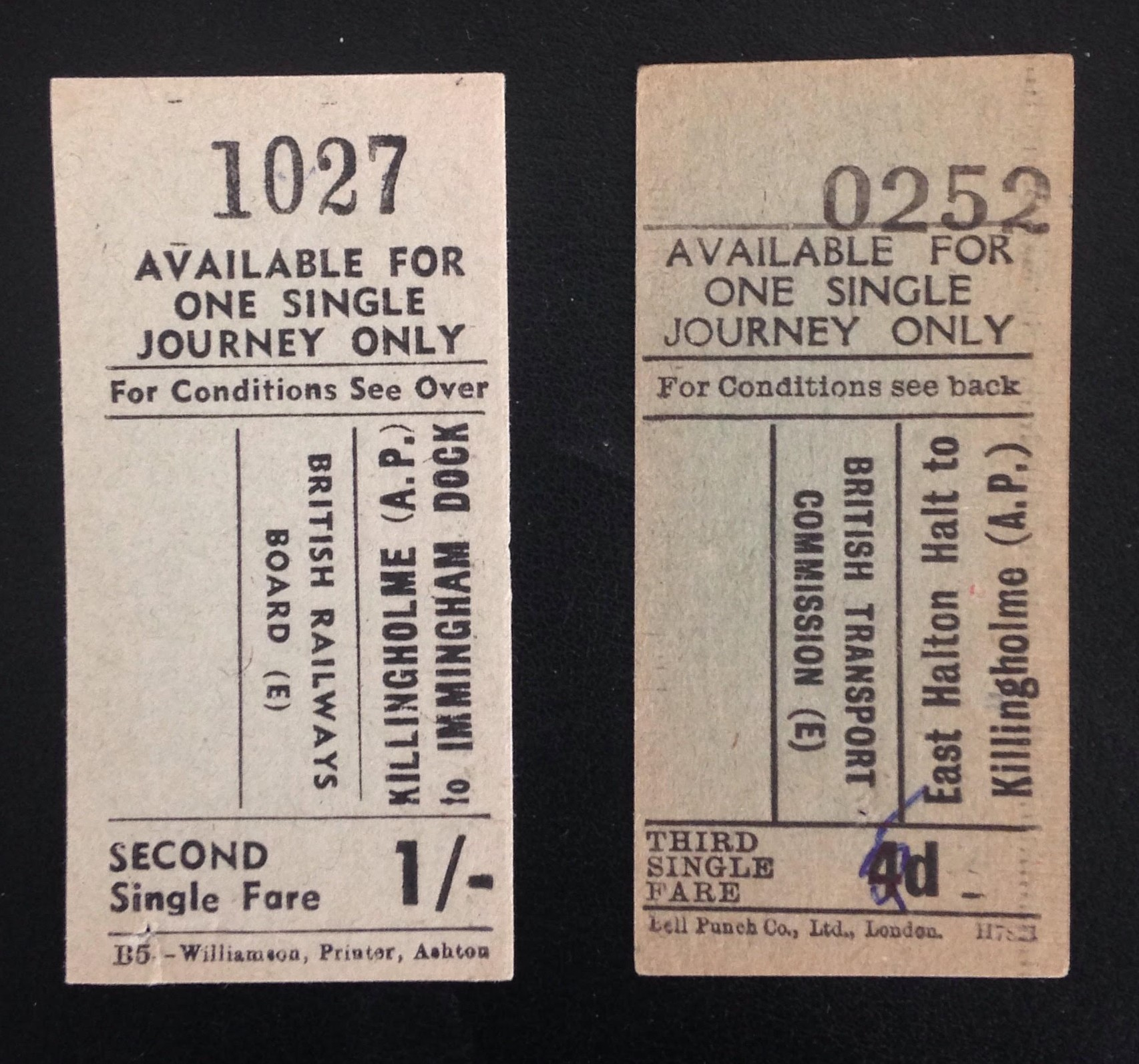
Tickets to and from Killingholme (Admiralty Platform) station

Killingholme Admiralty Platform railway station, known locally as Admiralty Platform, was near North Killingholme Haven, Lincolnshire, England.

The station was opened by the Great Central Railway in 1913 a later addition to the branch line from Goxhill to Immingham Dock, near both the former seaplane base at RNAS Killingholme and the Admiralty oil terminal at North Killingholme Haven.

Like its neighbour Killingholme, Admiralty Platform had a single, straight, wooden platform with minimal facilities. These were still intact when a RCTS Special called four years after closure on 7 October 1967.

The station was unusual in several respects:

- although opened primarily to serve a naval base it was a public station, at least outside wartime;
- it evaded maps, including OS maps;
- it evaded timetables;
- it evaded Signalling Record Society records.

and

- no tickets were thought to survive which show the station as a starting point, but an example has now been found, (see picture).

The station closed on 17 June 1963 along with the other stations on the line.

When the line and station opened the area was rural and thinly populated. By 2015 the area round the former station had become industrial but remained thinly populated. The track through the station site was still in use for freight.

Preceding station	Disused railways	Following station
East Halton; Line and station closed	London and North Eastern Railway	Killingholme; Line and station closed
