= Great Grimsby and Sheffield Junction Railway =

Overview
- Headquarters: Grimsby, England
- Dates of operation: 1845–1847
- Predecessor: Grimsby Docks Company
- Successor: Manchester, Sheffield and Lincolnshire Railway

Technical
- Track gauge: 4 ft 8 1/2 in (1,435 mm)

The Great Grimsby and Sheffield Junction Railway was an early British railway company which existed between 1845 and 1847 with the intention of providing rail services between Grimsby, New Holland and Gainsborough in the county of Lincolnshire. It amalgamated with the Sheffield, Ashton-Under-Lyne and Manchester Railway and the Sheffield and Lincolnshire Junction Railway, the three being renamed the Manchester, Sheffield and Lincolnshire Railway in 1847.

== History ==
=== The company ===
As a company, it was the oldest of the three, having begun in 1796 as the Grimsby Haven Company, when the harbour was enlarged. When new fishing grounds were discovered on the Dogger Bank trade increased and in 1845 the Grimsby Haven became part of the Grimsby Docks Company. Five of its directors were also on the board of the proposed Great Grimsby and Sheffield Junction Railway, intended to connect with the proposed Sheffield and Lincolnshire line. The decision was taken to amalgamate the two undertakings.

Great Grimsby and Sheffield Junction Railway Act 1845
- Act of Parliament
- Parliament of the United Kingdom
- Long title: An Act for making a Railway from a Place in the Parish of Bole in the County of Nottingham, near to the Town and Port of Gainsborough, to the Town and Port of Great Grimsby in the Parts of Lindsey in the County of Lincoln, with Branches to the District or Place called New Holland, and to the Town of Market Rasen, to be called "The Great Grimsby and Sheffield Junction Railway."
- Citation: 8 & 9 Vict. c. l

Dates
- Royal assent: 30 June 1845

Other legislation
- Repealed by: Manchester, Sheffield and Lincolnshire Railway Act 1849

Status: Repealed

Both the SA&MR and the S&LJR were well represented on the board and it was the latter's engineer who had carried out the survey in 1844. He offered three alternatives, via Brigg, via Caistor or via Market Rasen. Of the three, the first was chosen, with a branch from Brigg to Market Rasen. The Great Grimsby and Sheffield Junction Railway Act 1845 (8 & 9 Vict. c. l) received royal assent at the same time as the Grimsby Docks Company was approved in 1845. The ferries on the Humber were also purchased and a branch would be built to New Holland. In 1846 permission was gained for line from Market Rasen to Lincoln.

=== Lines and stations ===
The first board meeting of the amalgamated Manchester, Sheffield and Lincolnshire Railway took place on 6 January 1847. Work concentrated on the section between Grimsby and New Holland Pier, which opened on 1 March 1848 concurrently the East Lincolnshire Railway from Grimsby to Louth (now part of the Great Northern). There were stations at Goxhill, Ulceby, Habrough, Stallingborough, Healing and Great Coates. The station at Thornton Abbey was built in 1849 replacing one at Thornton Curtis. The line from Ulceby to Brigg opened a few months later, followed by that to Market Rasen and thence to Lincoln. The first included stations at Brocklesby and Barnetby. The latter had stations at Moortown, Holton Le Moor, Usselby, Wickenby, Langworth and Reepham. The section between Brigg and Gainsborough opened in 1849, with stations at Scawby and Hibaldstow, Kirton Lindsey, Northorpe and Blyton.

== Officers ==
- Charles Anderson-Pelham, 1st Earl of Yarborough (chairman)
- Michael Ellison (deputy chairman)
- John Hambly Humfrey (secretary)
- John Fowler (engineer)

== See also ==
- Grimsby District Light Railway (Grimsby-Cleethorpes)
- Grimsby and Immingham Electric Railway (Grimsby-Immingham)
- Barton and Immingham Light Railway (Immingham-Barton upon Humber)
