= East Halton =

Village in Lincolnshire, England

Coordinates: 53.6667°N 0.2833°W

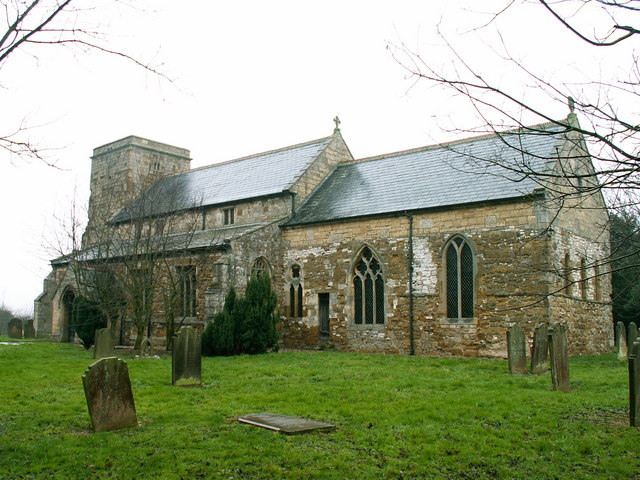
- Church of St Peter, East Halton

- Location within Lincolnshire
- Population: 626 (2011)
- OS grid reference: TA139197
  - London: 150 mi (240 km) S
- Civil parish: East Halton
- Unitary authority: North Lincolnshire
- Ceremonial county: Lincolnshire
- Region: Yorkshire and the Humber
- Country: England
- Sovereign state: United Kingdom
- Post town: IMMINGHAM
- Postcode district: DN40
- Dialling code: 01469
- Police: Humberside
- Fire: Humberside
- Ambulance: East Midlands
- UK Parliament: Brigg and Immingham

East Halton is a small village and civil parish in North Lincolnshire, England. It is situated close to the Humber estuary, approximately 4 miles (6 km) north-west from Immingham and 1 mile (1.6 km) north from the neighbouring village of North Killingholme.

The 2001 census recorded a population of 604 people, increasing to 626 at the 2011 census.

East Halton Grade I listed Anglican church is dedicated to St Peter. It originated in the 13th century, and was restored by James Fowler of Louth in 1868, who raised the chancel and aisle. The village had Wesleyan and Primitive Methodist chapels.

The village has a primary school, village shop and post office, and the Black Bull public house.

East Halton was previously served by East Halton railway station on the New Holland and Immingham Dock branch of the Great Central Railway.

East Halton is home to a rare Lincolnshire variant of the British brownie legend. According to a nineteenth-century account, a helpful supernatural folklore being aided a local farmer for years, asking only for a linen smock each New Year. When offered a coarse sack instead, the creature vanished forever, cursing the farmer’s thrift and foretelling misfortune.
