= Barton line =

Railway line in North and North East Lincolnshire, England

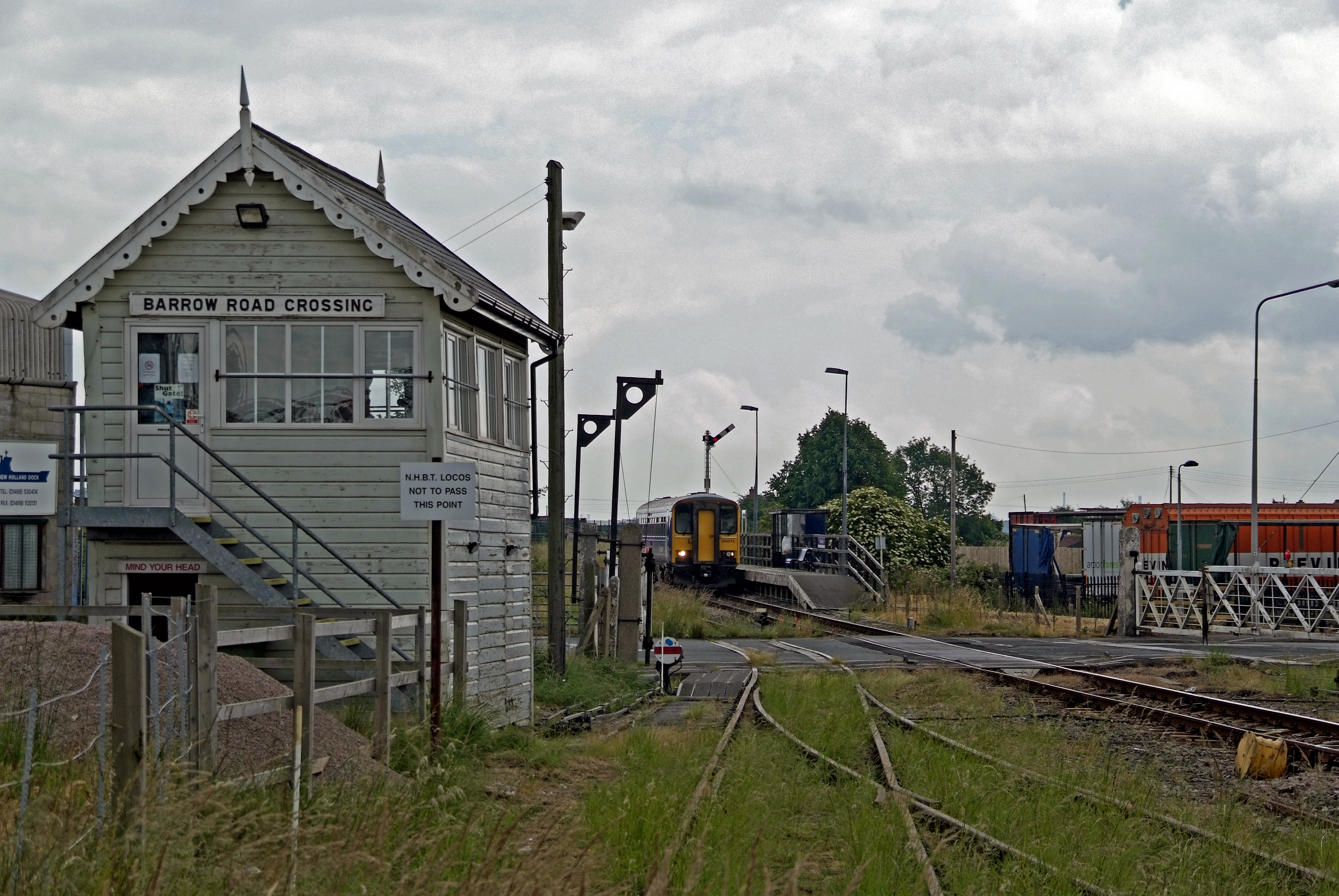
- The line at New Holland, with the manually operated crossing and disused line to the docks in the foreground

Overview
- Status: Operational
- Owner: Network Rail
- Locale: North Lincolnshire; North East Lincolnshire; Yorkshire and the Humber
- Termini: Barton-on-Humber 53.6889°N 0.4435°W; Cleethorpes 53.5620°N 0.0292°W
- Stations: 14

Service
- Type: Heavy rail
- System: National Rail
- Services: Barton-on-Humber–Cleethorpes; Ulceby–Great Coates (freight to Immingham)
- Operator: East Midlands Railway
- Rolling stock: Class 158 Express Sprinter; Class 170 Turbostar

History
- Opened: 1848

Technical
- Line length: 22 miles 72 chains (36.85 km)
- Number of tracks: 1 (Barton-on-Humber–New Holland); 2 (New Holland–Ulceby); 1 (Ulceby–Habrough Junction); 2 (Habrough–Grimsby Town); 1 (Grimsby Town–Cleethorpes)
- Character: Rural
- Track gauge: 4 ft 8 1/2 in (1,435 mm) standard gauge
- Electrification: None
Route map
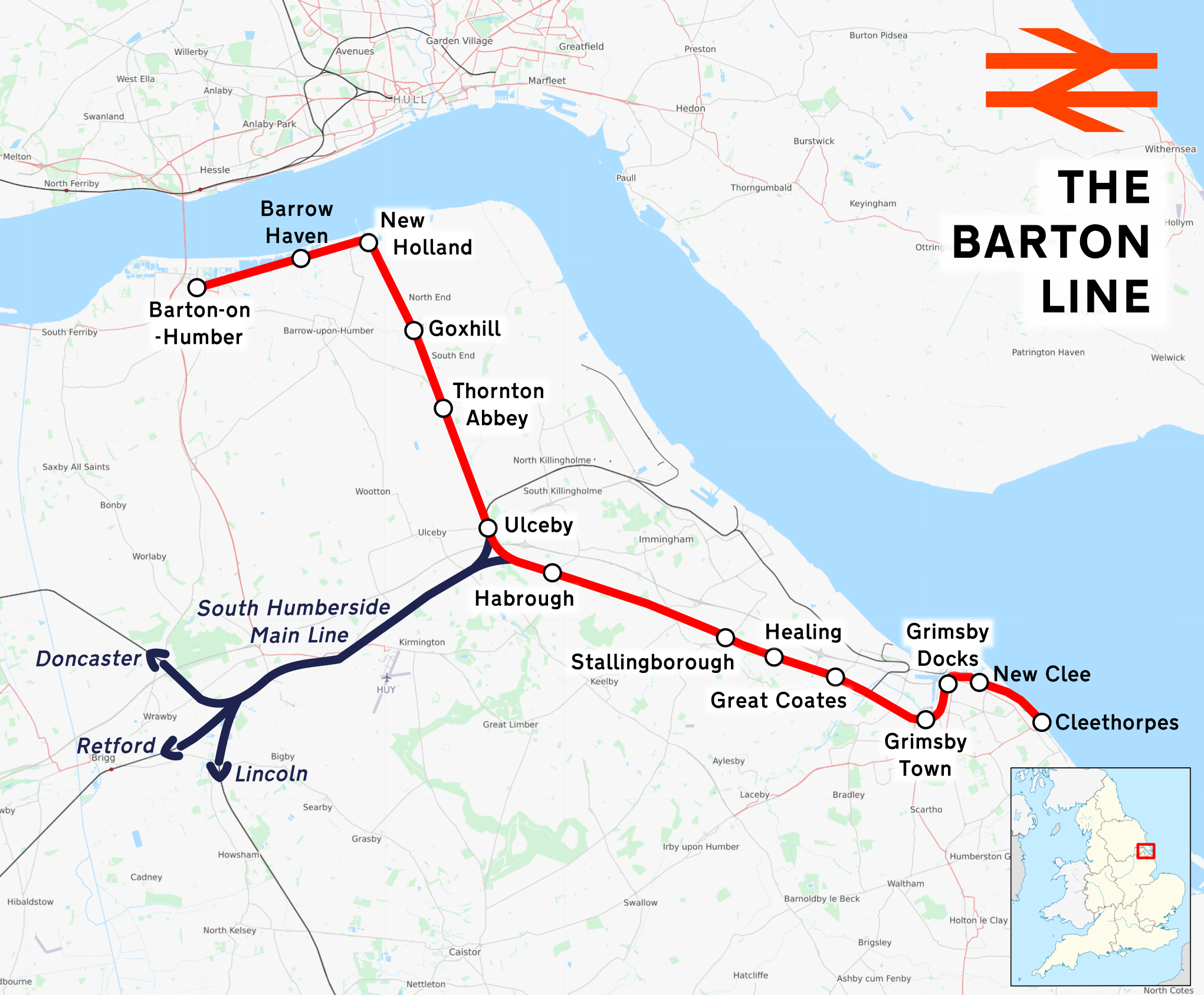
(Click to expand)

The Barton line is a railway line in North and North East Lincolnshire, England. It runs from Barton-upon-Humber south east to Cleethorpes and was designated by the Department for Transport as a community rail line in February 2007. Barton station is near to the Humber Bridge. It is situated on the south bank of the Humber Estuary.

== Stations served ==
The stations served by the route are listed below.

- Barton-on-Humber
- Barrow Haven
- New Holland
- Goxhill
- Thornton Abbey
- Ulceby
- Habrough
- Stallingborough
- Healing
- Great Coates
- Grimsby Town
- Grimsby Docks
- New Clee
- Cleethorpes

== Services and rolling stock ==
Services on the line were operated by Northern Trains and its predecessors until May 2021 when East Midlands Railway took over. As at July 2023, services operate every two hours in each direction on weekdays. Sunday trains only run during the summer months (May to early September).

Class 153s operated the line until December 2021 when replaced by Class 156s. In May 2023, the Class 156s were replaced by Class 170s.

On Monday to Saturday, the first service of the day from Cleethorpes to Barton-on-Humber, the 06:00 departure, and the 06:58 return was operated by a First TransPennine Express Class 185 (for operational reasons), although this service did not call at Great Coates and Thornton Abbey due to the low platforms. This practice ceased at the December 2013 timetable change and the first train from Cleethorpes now serves all intermediate stations other than New Clee, which is currently served by trains on request during daylight hours only.

Freight services previously served the chemical works at Barton-upon-Humber and the sidings at New Holland Pier. Since the closure of the chemical plant no scheduled freight services operate on the route, though occasional trainloads have operated from the bulk grain terminal at New Holland (which now occupies the former pier it remained rail-connected for a period, but the tracks are now in disrepair and unusable).

== Infrastructure ==
The line is mostly double track, except for the sections at each end and the connecting curve between Habrough and Ulceby. The eastern portion of the route as far as Habrough is shared with the South Humberside Main Line to Doncaster and Lincoln, whilst the short section either side of Ulceby also forms part of the busy freight artery between Brocklesby and the Port of Immingham. West of Ulceby the line is double as far as Oxmarsh Crossing (near New Holland), reverting to single for the final 3 1/4 miles (5.2 km) to the terminus at Barton. This section has several manual signal boxes with semaphore signalling and staffed & gated level crossings in operation. Network Rail planned to re-signal the line in 2015–16, with control passing to the York Rail Operating Centre – the level crossings on the line were automated and the existing signal box at Ulceby Junction abolished (those at Goxhill, Barrow Road and Oxmarsh Crossing remain).

== History ==
The New Holland to Grimsby Town section of the line follows the Great Grimsby and Sheffield Junction Railway, opened in 1848. This subsequently became part of the Manchester, Sheffield and Lincolnshire Railway and eventually the London and North Eastern Railway at the 1923 Grouping. The line was extended to Cleethorpes by the MS&LR in 1863, with a branch from Goxhill to the docks at Immingham added in 1911. The line was particularly busy during the Second World War, as it served Royal Air Force airfields at Goxhill and Killingholme in addition to the various industrial installations in the area. The line was twice proposed for closure in the 1960s (in 1963 and again four years later), but was reprieved on each occasion (though the Goxhill to Immingham Line did close in June 1963).

Prior to the opening of the Humber Bridge in June 1981, passenger services ran via New Holland Pier where they connected with the Humber Ferry service across the Humber to Corporation Pier in Hull but after the bridge was commissioned the ferry service was withdrawn and a new chord line and replacement station provided at New Holland to allow trains to run directly to and from Barton. Since then, the connection to and from Hull has been provided by Stagecoach in Lincolnshire bus over the bridge and now operates out of Hull Paragon Interchange.

The service ran hourly until the spring of 1990, but was cut to the current two-hourly pattern at that year's timetable change by British Rail due to unreliability and a shortage of rolling stock. The winter Sunday service also suffered the same fate in 1999 following the abolition of Humberside County Council and subsequent withdrawal of funding by the replacement unitary authorities.
