= Habrough railway station =

Railway station in Lincolnshire, England

Habrough
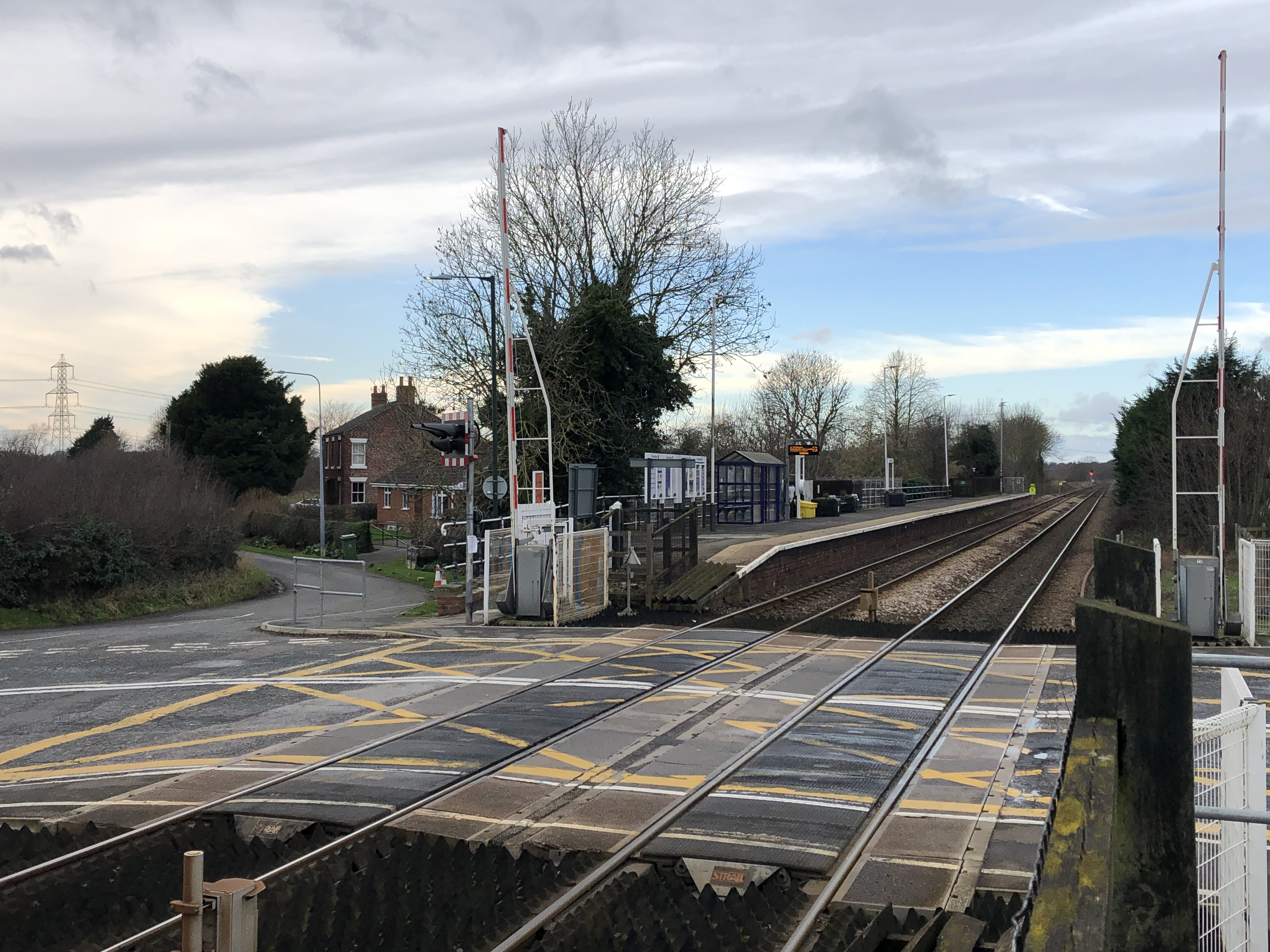
- Platform 1 viewed from Platform 2 in 2023

General information
- Location: Habrough, North East Lincolnshire; England
- Coordinates: 53.60603°N 0.26885°W
- Grid reference: TA146135
- Managed by: East Midlands Railway
- Platforms: 2

Other information
- Station code: HAB
- Classification: DfT category F2

History
- Original company: Great Grimsby and Sheffield Junction Railway
- Pre-grouping: Great Central Railway
- Post-grouping: LNER

Key dates
- 1 March 1848: opened

Passengers
- 2020/21: ▼10,986
- Interchange: ▼12
- 2021/22: ▲38,382
- Interchange: ▲184
- 2022/23: ▼35,076
- Interchange: ▲357
- 2023/24: ▲46,478
- Interchange: ▲465
- 2024/25: ▲59,518
- Interchange: ▲586
Location
Notes
- Passenger statistics from the Office of Rail and Road

Habrough railway station serves the village of Habrough and the town of Immingham in North East Lincolnshire, England. It was built by the Great Grimsby and Sheffield Junction Railway in 1848. Up until 1988 there was a signal box at the station on the south side of the track and east side of the road with manually operated gates. It was of typical Great Central Railway signal box design. The main buildings were located on the eastbound platform and were linked to the westbound one via a footbridge, but both have also been demolished and the level crossing was converted to an AHB (Automatic Half-Barrier) crossing. In 2015/2016, it was converted to a full-barrier level crossing with Obstacle Detection (MCB-OD).

The station is managed by East Midlands Railway, and is also served by TransPennine Express services.

== Facilities ==
The station is unstaffed and has no ticketing provision, so passengers must buy their tickets in advance or on the train. Other than waiting shelters on each platform, the only amenities provided timetable information poster boards. Step-free access to both sides is available via the level crossing (the platforms are staggered either side of the crossing).

There is a shop adjacent to the station on the Platform 1 side, which sells hot drinks.

== Services ==
Services at the station are operated by East Midlands Railway and TransPennine Express.

On weekdays, the station is served by an hourly TransPennine Express service between Cleethorpes and Liverpool Lime Street. East Midlands Railway operate a two-hourly service between Cleethorpes and Matlock via Lincoln and Nottingham as well as a two-hourly service between Cleethorpes and Barton-on-Humber.

On Sundays, the TransPennine Express service is two-hourly in the morning but increases to hourly in the afternoon.

Habrough's railway station is a boundary station for North Lincolnshire and North East Lincolnshire areas. There is no direct passenger service between Barnetby and Ulceby.

| Preceding station | National Rail | Following station |
|---|---|---|
| Ulceby | East Midlands Railway Barton Line | Stallingborough |
| Barnetby | East Midlands Railway Grimsby–Lincoln–Newark line | Grimsby Town |
| Barnetby | TransPennine Express: South Humberside Main Line; (South TransPennine) | Grimsby Town |
