= Brocklesby railway station =

Closed railway station in Lincolnshire, England

Brocklesby
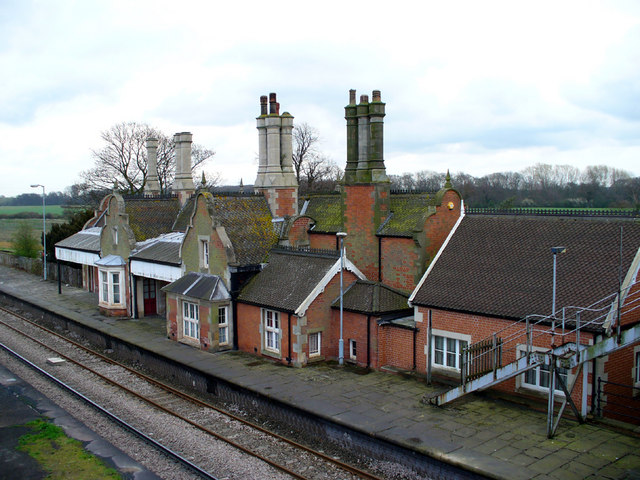

General information
- Location: Brocklesby, Lincolnshire; England
- Coordinates: 53.6068°N 0.3099°W
- Platforms: 2

Other information
- Status: Disused

History
- Original company: Great Grimsby and Sheffield Junction Railway
- Pre-grouping: Great Central Railway
- Post-grouping: LNER

Key dates
- 1848: Opened
- 3 October 1993: Closed
Location

Brocklesby railway station was a station near Brocklesby, Lincolnshire. It was formally closed by British Rail on 3 October 1993.

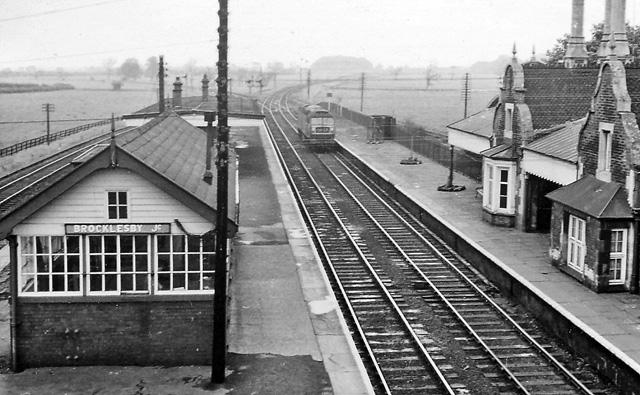
The station in 1967

The station was located to suit the Earl of Yarborough, in his capacity as chairman of the Manchester, Sheffield and Lincolnshire Railway who built the line. It included a private waiting room for the earl. The building was designed by architects Weightman and Hadfield in the Tudor Gothic style used throughout the line. The building is listed as grade II, in which the style is referred to as Jacobean.

The unusual platform-based signal box is also a grade II listed building and became redundant due to resignalling works in December 2015.

On 27 March 1907, two freight trains collided at Brocklesby.

Former services

Preceding station	Disused railways	Following station
Barnetby	Great Central	Habrough
