= Immingham (Eastern Jetty) railway station =

Former railway station in England

Immingham (Eastern Jetty)
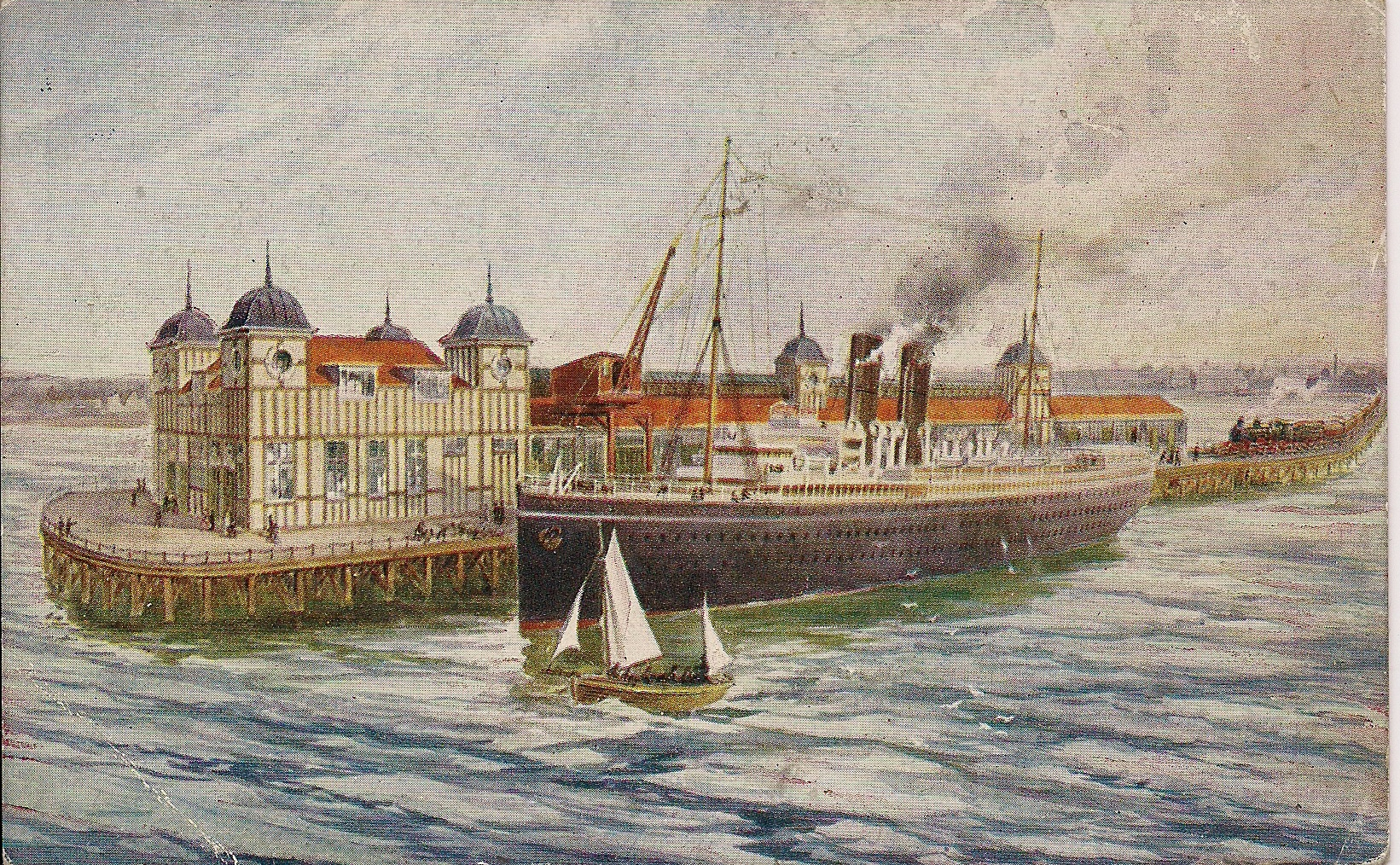
- A postcard of the station in the 1910s

General information
- Location: Immingham, North East Lincolnshire; England
- Coordinates: 53.6307°N 0.1819°W
- Grid reference: TA203165
- Platforms: 1

Other information
- Status: Disused

History
- Original company: Great Central Railway
- Pre-grouping: Great Central Railway
- Post-grouping: London and North Eastern Railway

Key dates
- 15 May 1912: opened
- 1939: closed
Location

Immingham (Eastern Jetty) railway station was a special excursion station built along the port's eastern jetty to cater for traffic to passenger ships on cruises to the North Cape, Norwegian Fjords and the Baltic.

The station was not much more than a long wooden platform along the jetty. It was only used for the transfer of the passengers and luggage from train to ship and vice versa so little in the way of facilities was needed or provided. The critical provision was numerous staff to guide travellers and handle their belongings.

== Traffic ==
The cruise ships sometimes berthed in the dock itself, but usually they moored at the seaward side of the jetty where they were adjacent to all-First Class, Restaurant Car special trains. These operated along two routes:

- to and from Manchester Central and Sheffield Victoria with a connecting carriage from Liverpool Central, and
- to and from Marylebone, travelling either via Retford and the Waleswood Curve or via the LDECR and Mansfield Central. In both cases they then used the main line via Leicester Central.

== Locomotives ==
Originally these trains were hauled by Great Central Railway 4-6-0 locomotives but following grouping in 1922 Great Northern Railway motive power took many of them over.

== Spectacle ==
Visits by such ships drew crowds of sightseers and passed into local folklore, none more so than the vessel SS Arandora Star which was torpedoed in 1940 with heavy loss of life.

== Closure ==
The cruises terminated in 1939, just prior to the Second World War. Although the platform remained for some time, the station was effectively closed. One source suggests GCR passenger vessels plied between here, Antwerp, Hamburg and Rotterdam.

== Afterlife ==
By 2015 the tracks on the jetty had long been lifted, but the structure remained well used, handling oils, spirits, and liquid chemicals.

== Liners known to have used Immingham ==
- SS Arandora Star
- SS Avon
- SS Calgaric
- SS Empress of Australia
- SS Orford
- SS Orontes
