= Barton and Immingham Light Railway =

Railway line in Lincolnshire, England

Barton & Immingham Light Railway
Overview
- Locale: North Lincolnshire / North East Lincolnshire
- Dates of operation: 1910–1963
Successor
London and
North Eastern Railway

Technical
- Track gauge: 4 ft 8 1/2 in (1,435 mm)
- Length: 7.5 miles

The Barton and Immingham Light Railway is a railway line in North Lincolnshire and North East Lincolnshire, Lincolnshire, England. It ran from a junction at Goxhill to Immingham Dock. Another spur runs from Immingham Dock to Ulceby. It was later absorbed by the Great Central Railway and later, on grouping, it passed to the London and North Eastern Railway. The railway is used for freight traffic to the ports at Immingham. The section from Goxhill to North Killingholme was mothballed and lifted. The track is still in situ but now overgrown and out of use.

The line was opened in stages: for goods from Immingham West junction to Killingholme on 1 December 1910 and onwards to Goxhill on 1 May 1911, then to passengers the next day, though a contemporary timetable advertised weekday only serviced of six trains each way starting in May 1911.

== Route ==
The route was authorised by the Barton and Immingham Light Railway Order 1907 as a direct link between Barton-upon-Humber and Immingham Dock. Only the section between Goxhill and Immingham was built and a junction with the Barton Line created. For the line's first years the temporary southern terminus was Immingham Western jetty. This station was adjacent to the ramp carrying a line onto the jetty. At some point in or after 1922 it was replaced by the permanent Immingham Dock station a short distance nearer the dock entrance.

Passenger services operated for the entire life of the line. When the majority of the line was shut in 1963, a service to Immingham Dock was maintained via Ulceby for a further 6 years until 1969.

The line is still partially open at its southern end to freight traffic for Immingham Dock and nearby industries.
