= Port of Immingham =

Port in Lincolnshire, England

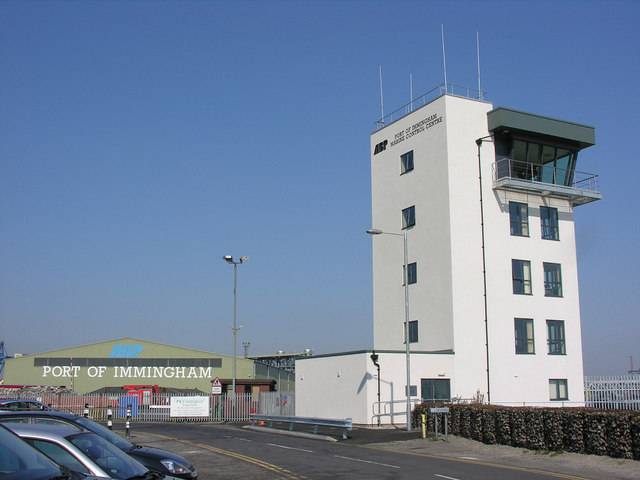
- Immingham Marine Control Centre
- Interactive map of Port of Immingham
- Location within the United Kingdom

Location
- Country: England
- Location: Immingham
- Coordinates: 53.62718°N 0.19097°W
- UN/LOCODE: GBIMM

Details
- Opened: 1912
- Owned by: Associated British Ports
- Type of Harbor: Deepwater; Multi-model; Super-Panamax; Warm-water
- Land area: 1,230 acres (5.0 km^{2})
- No. of berths: 8

Statistics
- Annual cargo tonnage: 46 million
- Value of cargo: £75 billion
- Website www.abports.co.uk

The Port of Immingham, also known as Immingham Dock, is a major port on the east coast of England, on the south bank of the Humber in the town of Immingham, Lincolnshire. In 2019, the Port of Grimsby & Immingham was the largest port in the United Kingdom by tonnage, with 54.1 million tonnes of cargo passing through that year.

The port was established by the Humber Commercial Railway and Dock Company in association with the Great Central Railway; the dock company incorporated and the works permitted by the Humber Commercial Railway and Dock Act 1901 (1 Edw. 7. c. ccii). Construction of the dock started in 1906 and was completed by 1912. The original main purpose of the dock was export of coal.

In the second half of the 20th century the port was considerably expanded beyond its locked dock, and east and west jetties; with the addition of several deep water jetties for bulk cargos: this included the Immingham Oil Terminal (1969, expanded 1994) for oil importation to the new Continental Oil and Lindsay Oil refineries; the Immingham Bulk Terminal (1970) built as a joint scheme by the National Coal Board and British Steel Corporation for coal export and iron ore import; the Immingham Gas Jetty (1985) for LPG import; and the Humber International Terminal (2000, expanded 2006) for bulk cargos. Roll-on/Roll-off terminals were first operated in 1966, and expanded within the dock in the 1990s, and outside the dock at the Immingham Outer Harbour (2006). There are freight ferries to several European cities.

== History ==
=== Background ===
From the mid 19th century onwards the Manchester, Sheffield and Lincolnshire Railway developed the Port of Grimsby into a modern outlet for its rail system onto the east coast of England.

In 1874 a report was commissioned from Charles Liddell on alternatives to expansion at Grimsby – it recommended a new dock west of Grimsby at South Killingholme, preferable due to low land costs and proximity to the Humber Estuary's navigable channel. Liddell's scheme was not proceeded with at that time.

Humber Commercial Railway and Dock Act 1901
- Act of Parliament
- Parliament of the United Kingdom
- Long title: An Act for authorising the construction of a dock sea walls railways and other works adjoining the existing docks at Grimsby in the County of Lincoln to be called the Humber Commercial Railway and Dock and for other purposes.
- Citation: 1 Edw. 7. c. ccii

Dates
- Royal assent: 9 August 1901

In 1900 the Humber Commercial Railway and Dock Company was formed with the aim of expanding the Grimsby Docks system – it sought powers from Parliament to build a new dock west adjacent of the Royal Dock, and north of Alexandra Dock, on the banks of the Humber; this development was passed as the Humber Commercial Railway and Dock Act 1901 (1 Edw. 7. c. ccii). The Great Central Railway (GCR), owner of the Grimsby Docks was willing to back the scheme, but sought the advice of Sir John Wolfe Barry, who reported that the approach channel to the dock would have required extensive dredging; he later reported in favour of a scheme near Immingham, similar in location to that earlier proposed by Liddell. The GCR acquired land near their preferred dock, and informed the promoters of the scheme it was to withdraw its support, unless the scheme was changed to one better positioned on the Humber, near Stallingborough, nearer to a deep water channel;

Humber Commercial Railway and Dock Act 1904
- Act of Parliament
- Parliament of the United Kingdom
- Long title: An Act to empower the Humber Commercial Railway and Dock Company to construct a new dock with connecting railway and other works and entrance into the River Humber to abandon the dock and works authorized by the Humber Commercial Railway and Dock Act 1901 and for other purposes.
- Citation: 4 Edw. 7. c. lxxxv

Dates
- Royal assent: 22 July 1904

Text of statute as originally enacted

Humber Commercial Railway and Dock Act 1908
- Act of Parliament
- Parliament of the United Kingdom
- Long title: An Act to authorise the Humber Commercial Railway and Dock Company to acquire additional lands and to make road works for the purposes of their dock at Immingham to authorise the said Dock Company and the Great Central Railway Company to acquire additional lands for the purpose of forming junctions between the Dock Company's railways and the Grimsby District Light Railway and for other purposes.
- Citation: 8 Edw. 7. c. xlix

Dates
- Royal assent: 1 August 1908

Humber Commercial Railway and Dock Act 1913
- Act of Parliament
- Parliament of the United Kingdom
- Long title: An Act to authorise the Humber Commercial Railway and Dock Company to make embankments in the River Humber at the entrance to Immingham Dock and for other purposes.
- Citation: 3 & 4 Geo. 5. c. xx

Dates
- Royal assent: 4 July 1913

Text of statute as originally enacted

Plans were submitted to Parliament in 1902 for a dock near Immingham, but the bill was withdrawn due to conditions requiring the GCR to dredge the Humber shipping channels to undo any change thought to have been caused by the dock works. Under pressure from interested parties the Board of Trade commissioned an inspection of the channels, which reported that no serious negative change would be expected from the new dock works. A bill was re-submitted in 1903. Features of the scheme were: a new dock in the parish of Immingham with lock and entrance channel, with jetties on the east and west side; a railway with a junction north of the Great Central Railway's line at Ulceby station to the dock; and rights to dredge, divert streams (Immingham Haven), to raise funds, to make working arrangements with the Great Central Railway; and rights of compulsory purchase. The scheme was passed as the Humber Commercial Railway and Dock Act 1904 (4 Edw. 7. c. lxxxv). The 1904 act was modified by subsequent acts, the Humber Commercial Railway and Dock Act 1908 (8 Edw. 7. c. xlix), the Great Central Railway (Various Powers) Act 1909 (9 Edw. 7. c. lxxxv), and the Humber Commercial Railway and Dock Act 1913 (3 & 4 Geo. 5. c. xx), which extended the time for construction, allowed raising additional capital, and made minor changes to the original plans. The primary purpose of the dock was export of coal from Derbyshire and Yorkshire coalfields.

=== Construction and opening, 1906–1912 ===
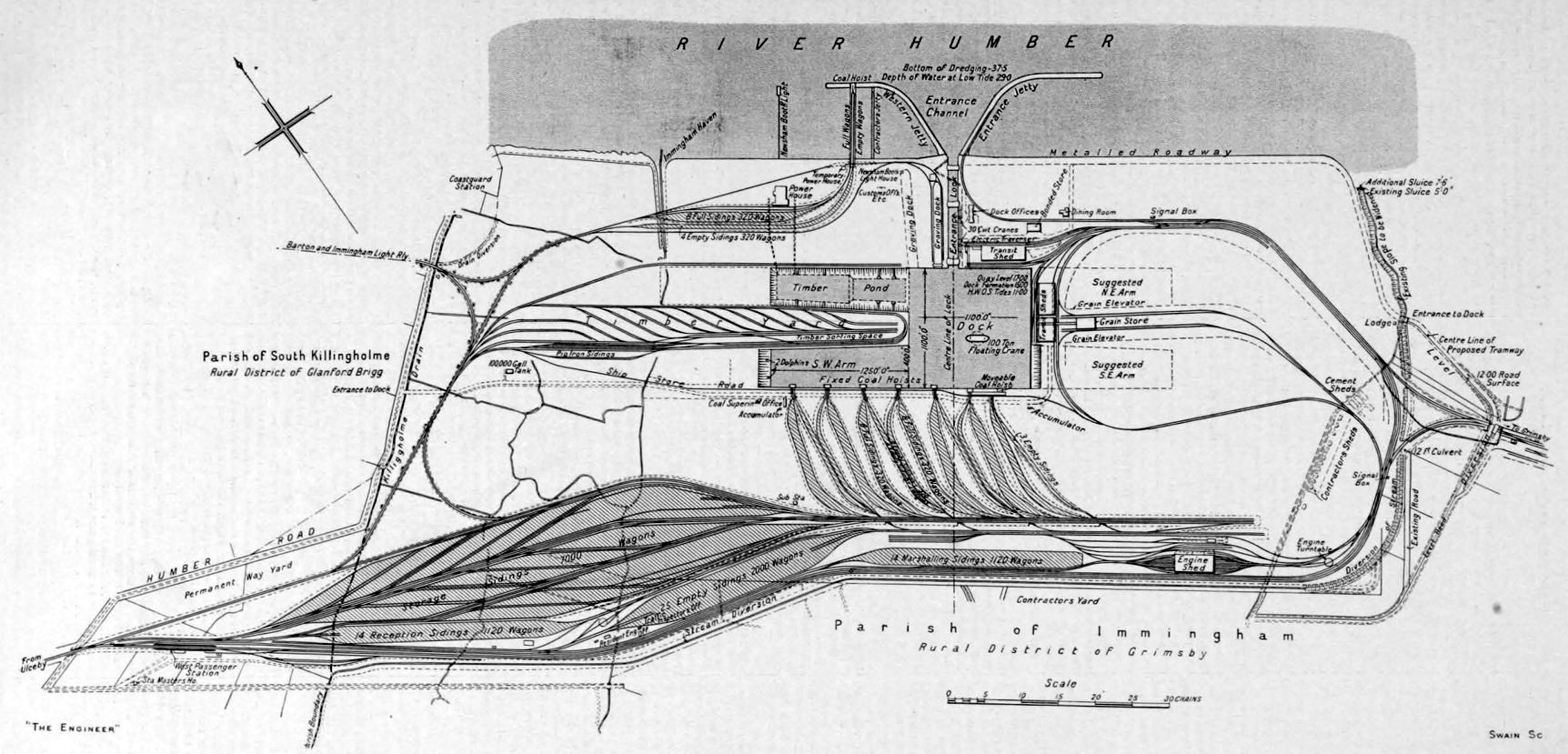
Immingham Dock and rail lines, c. 1912

The dock was designed by the firm of Sir John Wolfe Barry and partners, and contracted to Price, Wills and Reeves (Westminster), constructed on a site of over 1,000 acres (400 ha), with a river frontage of about 1.5 miles (2.4 km). Work was formally initiated on the dock by Lady Henderson, wife of the Great Central chairman Alexander Henderson in July 1906.

Three new short railway lines were sanctioned and constructed to connect to the dock from the west, east and south: these were the Humber Commercial Railway with a connection 5 miles (8 km) away at Ulceby, (Note: 53.62077°N 0.30155°W, Immingham Commercial Dock railway, junction with former Great Grimsby and Sheffield Junction Railway) on the former Great Grimsby and Sheffield Junction Railway (GG&SJR); the Barton and Immingham Light Railway ran from a junction near Goxhill (GG&SJR) connecting to the Humber Commercial line at a junction on the west side of the dock estate; (Note: 53.63378°N 0.20965°W, Immingham Commercial Dock railway, junction with former Barton and Immingham Light Railway) and the Grimsby District Light Railway to Grimsby connecting via a junction onto the Humber Commercial line, (Note: 53.61836°N 0.18090°W, Immingham Commercial Dock railway, junction with former Grimsby District Light Railway) on the east side of the dock estate. The light railway to Grimsby was connected to the Great Coates branch by 1906; the line was used during the construction of the dock by the contractors, and a passenger service was begun in 1910.

Initial work on the dock included diversion of drains, and dredging of the entrance channel to the Humber. Approximately 2,500,000 cubic yards (1,900,000 m^{3}) of excavated material from the dock was used in the construction for levelling. The dock walls were made of concrete, with granite coping; the lock pit was constructed with concrete side walls and a shallow inverted arch of brickwork at the invert. Installation of the lock gates and their machinery was by Head Wrightson.

As built (1912) the dock consisted of a main basin 1,100 feet (340 m) square, (Note: 53.62718°N 0.19097°W, Dock) with two arms to the north-west and south-west of approximately 1,250 by 375 feet (381 by 114 m) long by wide; a total enclosed area of 55.5 acres (22.5 ha). The design incorporated space for two further arms on the east side, mirroring the western arms. The entrance lock was 840 by 90 feet (256 by 27 m) split by lock gates into sections of 320 and 540 feet (98 and 165 m); (Note: 53.62964°N 0.18917°W, Lock) the lock had 28 feet (8.5 m) of water depth at ordinary spring tides. At the entrance where two jetties extending 650 feet (200 m) into the river, forming a guiding shape for the lock entrance – the eastern jetty was intended to be used for passenger services, (Note: 53.63079°N 0.18219°W, East jetty) whilst the western jetty found initial use as a coal loading point. (Note: A double deck steel bridge of 600ft in six 100 feet (30 m) spans was supplied by Head Wrightson to connect the west jetty to the rail network – the upper and lower decks held gravity fed rail tracks for full and returning empty wagons.) (Note: 53.63370°N 0.18942°W, West jetty)

The first dry dock was constructed adjacent parallel west of the entrance lock 740 by 56 feet (226 by 17 m) long by wide, (Note: 53.62913°N 0.19063°W, Humber Graving Dock) operated by Humber Commercial Railway and Dock Co. subsidiary the Humber Graving Dock & Engineering Co. East of the entrance lock was constructed the Dock Offices, built in an Arts and Crafts influenced style, with a Mansard roof encompassing dormer windows. (Note: 53.62941°N 0.18847°W, Dock offices)

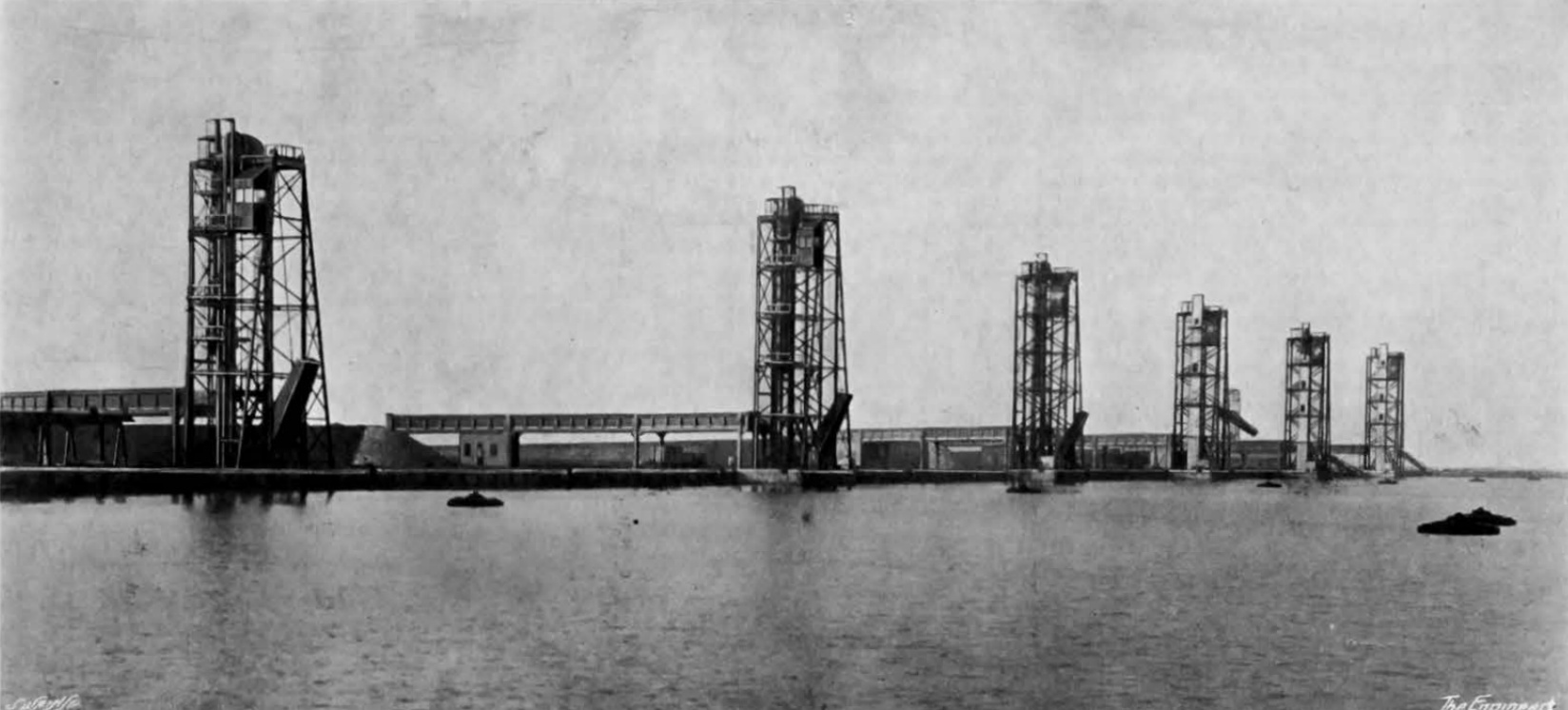
Coal hoists on the south quay c. 1912

The south quay of the dock was entirely equipped for coal export, with seven coal hoists, with capacity of 400 tons per hour. Extensive sidings were built mainly to the south of the dock, with inbound storage available for 8,000 (loaded) coal wagons, and outbound storage for 3,500 wagons. The north-western arm was initially built as a timber pond, with adjacent rail sidings. Coal hoists were hydraulically powered, supplied by gravity sidings carried across sidings by ferro-concrete bridges built by the Yorkshire Hennebique Contracting Company (Leeds). Six of the hoists were supplied by W.G. Armstrong Whitworth and Company; the seventh, a movable hoist was supplied by Tannet, Walker and Company (Leeds). The north quay of the south-western arm was used for pig iron handling, and was equipped with ten movable cranes from Armstrong Whitworth of lifting capacity of 5 or 3 tons, and a fixed crane with lifting capacity of up to 50 tons. Further cranes from Cowans, Sheldon & Company (Carlisle) were supplied for the transit sheds.

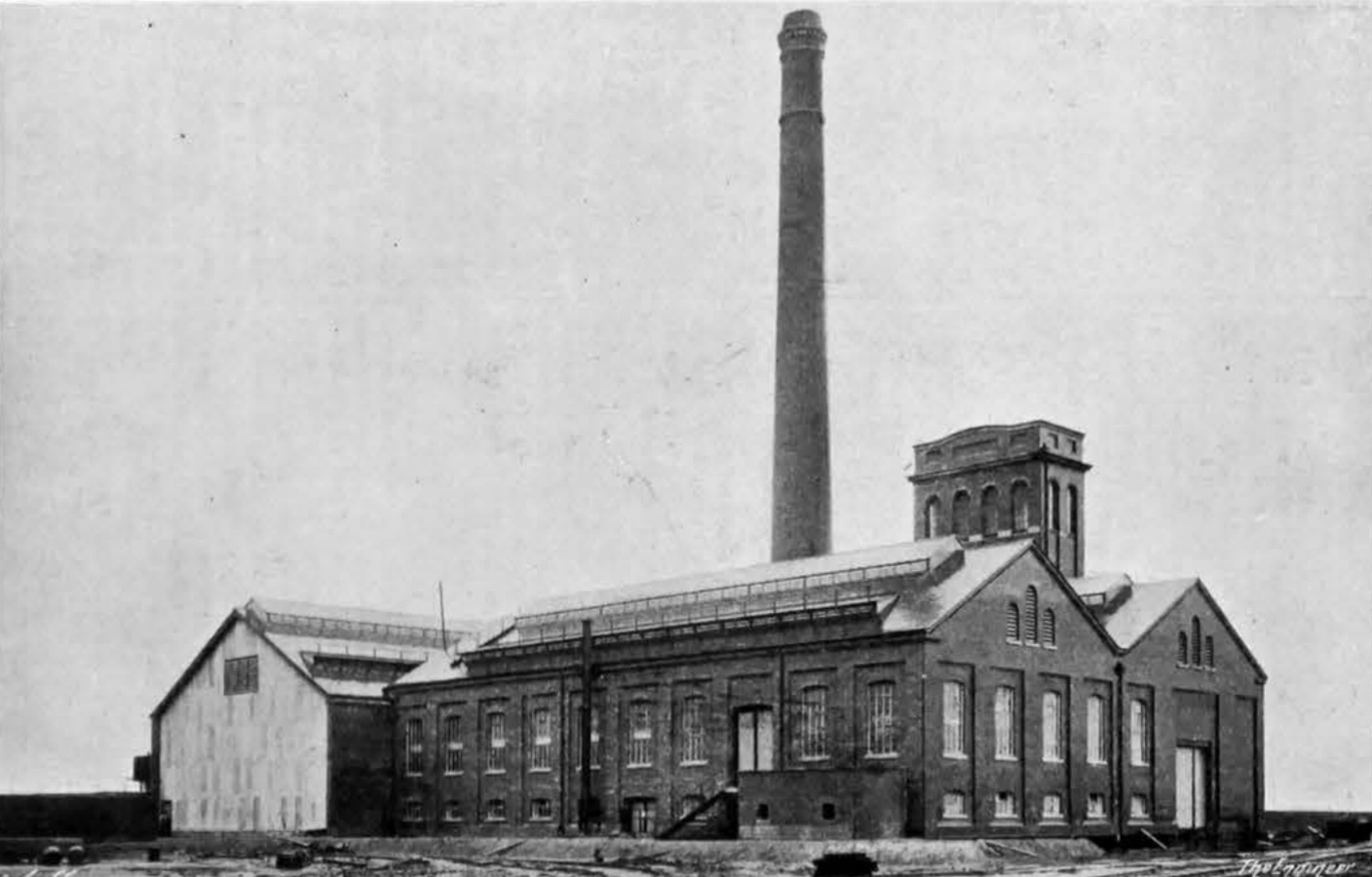
The hydraulic and electrical powerstation c. 1912

Much of the dock equipment was power via hydraulic power, whilst electrical power transmission was used for lighting, railway signalling, pumping equipment for the graving dock, and other purposes, including conveyor motors in the grain silo. For both purposes a power station, 188.5 by 104.5 feet (57.5 by 31.9 m) in ground plan was erected on the dock estate west of the main lock entrance. (Note: 53.63236°N 0.19398°W, Power station (site of)) Steam was supplied by eight 30 by 8.5 feet (9.1 by 2.6 m) long by wide Lancashire boilers at 180 pounds per square inch (1,200 kPa) – both hydraulic pumping and electrical generator plant was supplied by the same boilers, connected on a ring steam main. Hydraulic power was supplied via four pairs of horizontal condensing steam engines, with cylinder diameters of 24 and 44 inches (610 and 1,120 mm) with 36 inches (910 mm) stroke, each capable of pumping 700 imperial gallons (3,200 L; 840 US gal) per minute at 800 pounds per square inch (5,500 kPa) to two 36 feet (11 m) stroke accumulators. Most of the hydraulic machinery was supplied by W.G. Armstrong Whitworth and Company. Electrical power was provided via Curtis type steam turbines-alternators of 250 kilowatts (340 hp) (two machines), 500 kilowatts (670 hp), and 1,500 kilowatts (2,000 hp); supplying 6,000 V which was stepped down to 320 V to drive rotary converters; distribution of power was via a 3-phase 6,600 V supply to substations on the dock estate, containing rotary converters supplying 460 V DC. The electrical network included a substation halfway between Grimsby and Immingham supplying the Grimsby District Light Railway with 530 V DC; as well as a 1,200 kW 460 V supply via overhead electrical cable to the Grimsby Docks. Most of the electrical equipment was supplied by British Thomson-Houston.

The Humber Commercial Railway carried its first goods in July 1910. The Barton and Immingham Light Railway opened May 1911. A distant related work was the Doncaster Avoiding Line sanctioned 1903, and contracted in 1908 – the line allowed trains from west of Doncaster to avoid congestion at Doncaster station. An electrified tram line, the Grimsby and Immingham Electric Railway, parallel to the Grimsby District Light Railway was begun 1909 and opened 1912. On the dock estate a sixty locomotive capacity engine house was constructed. (Note: 53.61915°N 0.18984°W, Engine shed) (See also Immingham engine shed.)

Due to high demand for coal shipment facilities in the aftermath of a coal strike, the dock was provisionally opened on 15 May 1912. The dock was officially opened on 22 July 1912 by the King George V and Queen Mary; at the ceremony permission was given to name the new dock "The King's Dock", a moniker which did not persist; Sam Fay, general manager of the GCR was unexpectedly knighted by the King during the proceedings.

Shortly after opening a large reinforced concrete grain silo was completed (1913), capable of holding 20,000 tons of grain. The silo was built by Stuart's Granolithic Company, and grain handling equipment supplied by Henry Simon (Manchester). (Note: 53.62529°N 0.18681°W, Grain silo (site of))

=== History (1914–1969) ===
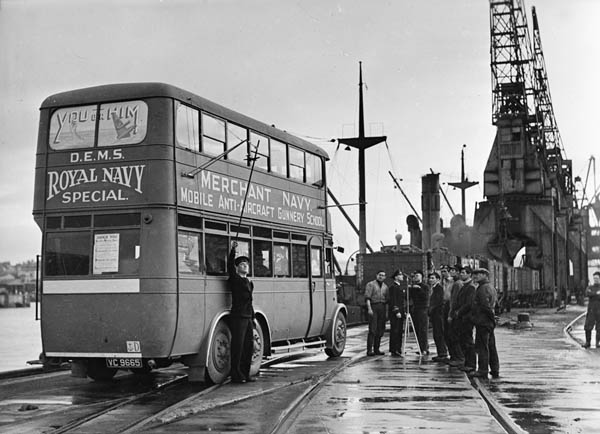
Anti aircraft gunnery training, 1940s

During the First World War, Immingham was a submarine base for British D class submarine.

During the 1930s the port was used for cruise ships, with vessels of the Orient Steam Navigation Company, White Star Line and Blue Star Line calling at the port.

During the Second World War the port was used as a naval base, and was the Royal Navy's headquarters for the Humber. Anti-aircraft batteries were located around the dock during the war.

During the war John Dowland and Leonard Harrison received the George Cross for defusing a bomb that had fallen onto the grain ship SS Kildare in February 1940 in Immingham Dock.

In 1950 a fertilizer plant was established on the dock estate, to the southeast. (Note: 53.62369°N 0.19085°W, Fisons Fertilizers) (See Fisons, Immingham.)

In 1957 construction of a new dry dock was begun, after acquisition of the Humber Gracing Dock & Engineering company by Richardsons Westgarth & Company; the new dry dock opened 1960, (Note: 53.62999°N 0.19171°W, Graving Dock, 1960) known as Henderson's Graving Dock.

The port's first roll-on/roll-off facility was constructed in 1966 for Tor Line.

=== History (1970–present) ===
The Immingham Oil Terminal (IOT) jetty on the banks of the Humber east of the dock entrance was opened 1969. (Note: 53.62995°N 0.16427°W, Immingham Oil Terminal jetty) The terminal was built to serve the new oil refineries (Continental Oil Refinery and Lindsey Oil Refinery) built near west of the Immingham Dock site. The initial construction consisted of a pier into the Humber with two berths, suitable for ships up to 200,000 dwt. The dolphin berths were constructed from 71 inches (1,800 mm) diameter tubes with 1.3-inch (32 mm) wall thickness driven over 60 feet (18 m) into the underlying ground, in groups of 3 to 6 tubes.

Immingham Bulk Terminal was commissioned in 1970 jointly by the National Coal Board (NCB) and British Steel Corporation (BSC) in association with the British Transport Docks Board (BTDB) for the export of coal and import of iron ore. (Note: 53.63840°N 0.19696°W, Immingham Bulk Terminal jetty) The cost of the terminal was £11.5 million. The coal terminal was designed to increase the efficiency of coal export by the NCB, the terminal was taken over by the BTDB in 1973, and leased back to the NCB and BSC, it was the NCB's main point of export for coal (1982). The ore terminal was part of British Steel's "Anchor" modernisation project at its Scunthorpe Steelworks, the ore terminal was completed 1972. Vessel capacities for the terminals were 100,000 dwt for the ore terminal and 35,000 dwt for the coal terminal.

A Liquid Petroleum Gas handling jetty "Immingham Gas Jetty" was opened in 1985 at a cost of £5 million; (Note: 53.64525°N 0.20605°W, Immingham Gas Terminal jetty) the terminal was connected to underground storage operated by Conoco and Calor Gas.

A third berth was commissioned at the Immingham oil terminal in 1994 at a cost of £18 million.

In June 1995 a new £13.5 million terminal was opened for shipping company DFDS. Located on the south-western arm of the dock, in 1999 the terminal had 4 roll-on/roll-off berths on a 50 acres (20 ha) site.

The shipyard at the graving docks closed in 2001. The Henderson Graving Dock has been converted into a shipping berth.

Humber International Terminal (HIT) became operational in August 2000. The terminal was built adjacent west of the Immingham Bulk Terminal on the Humber bank; a 300 metres (980 ft) berth dredged to a depth of 14.7 metres (48 ft). The main work was contracted to Edmund Nuttall and HAM Dredging. (Note: 53.64222°N 0.20218°W, Humber International Terminal jetty) In 2005 Associated British Ports decided to invest a further £15 million on a "Phase 2" extension of the terminal. The phase two berth extended the terminal's quay by 220 metres (720 ft), and was built primarily to handle imported coal. The terminal was formally opened by the Princess Royal in 2006.

A new Immingham West Jetty for petrochemical handling was contracted to Edmund Nuttall to a design by engineering firm Halcrow.

In 2004 transport minister David Jamieson allowed the construction of a £35 million, 5 berth roll-on/roll-off terminals at the port, for ferry operators DFDS Tor Line, suitable for vessels up to 225 by 35 metres (738 by 115 ft). The Immingham Outer Harbour Revision Order, 2004 permitted the construction of moorings and access ramps south and west of the jetty of the Humber International Terminal; and the removal of part of the Western jetty; as well as permitting dredging of a channel to the terminal to a maximum depth of 9 to 10 metres (30 to 33 ft). Three of the five permitted berths were constructed, and the Immingham Outer Harbour opened 2006. (Note: 53.63837°N 0.20056°W, Immingham Outer Harbour)

In 2007/8, a £45 million 200,000 ton (227,000 cubic metres (8,000,000 cu ft)) pa biofuel plant was constructed at the Port of Immingham, manufacturing biodiesel from vegetable oils.

In 2008 a 48 acres (19 ha) site was acquired in Stallingborough in 2008 to increase off dock estate storage space for cars. The site was operational by 2011.

In 2013 ABP began the development of the "Immingham Renewable Fuels Terminal" on the Humber International Terminal site, as part of a 15-year contract with Drax Power Station to supply biomass (wood pellet) to the powerplant. ABP's total investment in biomass handling facilities, including installations at Hull and Goole was to be around £100 million. (Note: A similar installation was constructed at King George Dock, Hull as part of the same scheme.) In April 2013 Graham Construction was awarded the contract to build the 3 million ton per annum facility, consisting of an automated biomass handling terminal utilizing continuous ship unloaders, with rail and road export facilities, and with 100,000 ton storage capacity, using four silos each of 168,000 cubic metres (5,900,000 cu ft). The project entered the commissioning phase in mid 2014. The second phase of the project was to add a further 3 million tons pa capacity. Two 2,300 ton per hour screw unloading biomass handling cranes were installed by May 2015.

In 2018 Associated British Ports took over operation of British Steel's Immingham Bulk Terminal with an investment of £65 million. At the same time Derbyshire based metal and recycling specialist, Ward, opened a deep sea dock export facility at Immingham to expand its capabilities to export metal. British Steel took back control of the Immingham port facility in 2020.

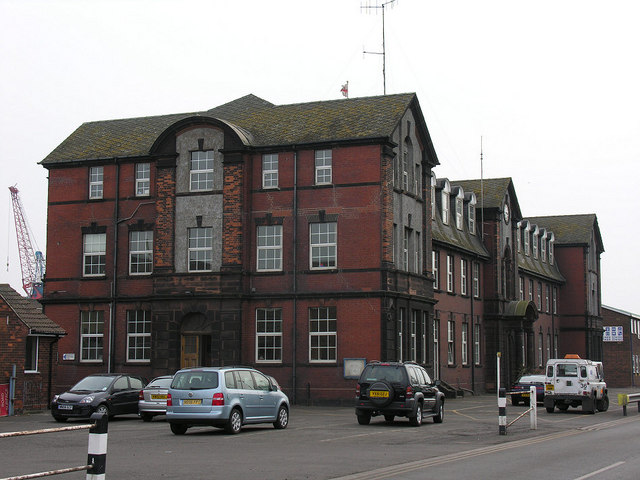
The Dock Offices (2007)

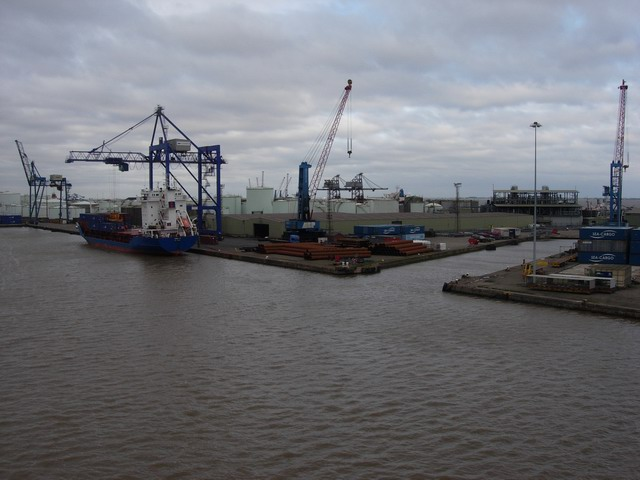
Immingham Dock (2008)

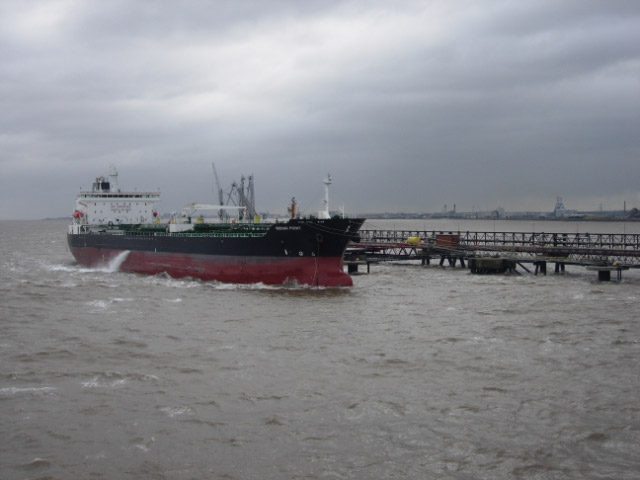
Immingham Oil Terminal (2008)

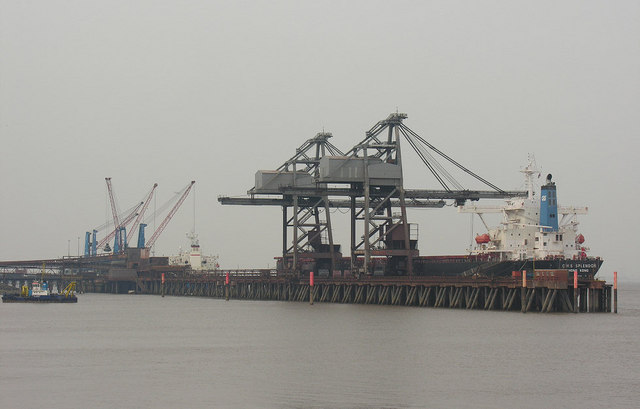
Immingham Bulk Terminal (2007)

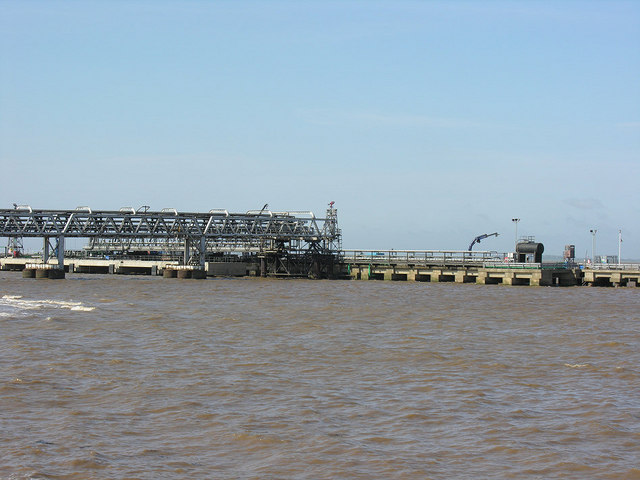
West Jetty (2007)

== Seafarers' Welfare ==
The port has a seafarers' centre where chaplains from the Catholic seafarers' charity Apostleship of the Sea are based.

== See also ==
- Immingham Dock railway station, Immingham Dock electric railway station, Immingham (Eastern Jetty) railway station – railway stations on the dock estate
- Industry of the South Humber Bank
- Port of Hull, specifically King George Dock, a contemporary (1914) development on the north bank of the Humber.

== Acts and legislation ==
- 1 Edw. 7. c. ccii (1901), Humber Commercial Railway and Dock Act 1901, Act for a new dock in Grimsby.
- 4 Edw. 7. c. lxxxv (1904), Humber Commercial Railway and Dock Act 1904, a proposed dock to be sited instead at a site in Immingham.
  - 8 Edw. 7. c. xlix (1908), Humber Commercial Railway and Dock Act 1908, modifications of the 1904 act.
  - 9 Edw. 7. c. lxxxv (1909), Great Central Railway (Various Powers) Act 1909, clarification, additional capital.
  - 3 & 4 Geo. 5. c. xx (1913), Humber Commercial Railway and Dock Act 1913,
- "The Associated British Ports (Immingham Outer Harbour) Harbour Revision Order 2004", www.legislation.gov.uk, no. 2190, 2004
- "The Associated British Ports (Immingham Gas Jetty) Harbour Revision Order 2007", www.legislation.gov.uk, no. 1803, 2007
