= Barton-on-Humber railway station =

Railway station in Barton-upon-Humber, England

Barton-on-Humber
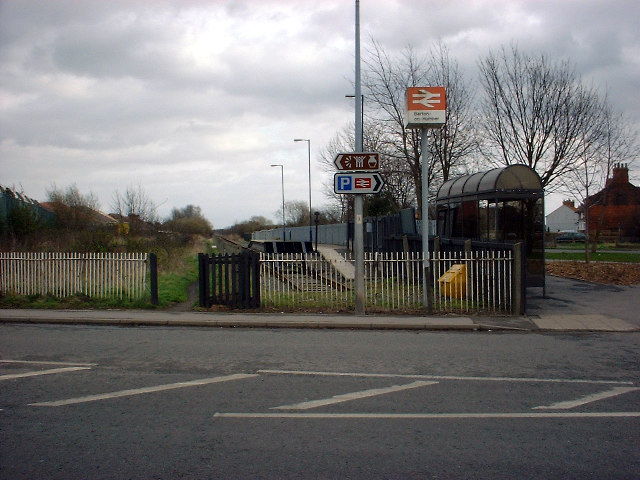

General information
- Location: Barton-upon-Humber, North Lincolnshire; England
- Coordinates: 53.689°N 0.443°W
- Grid reference: TA029225
- Manager: East Midlands Railway
- Platforms: 1

Other information
- Station code: BAU
- Classification: DfT category F1

History
- Opened: 1 March 1849

Passengers
- 2021/22: ▲20,338
- 2022/23: ▲24,296
- 2023/24: ▲29,848
- 2024/25: ▲33,106
- 2025/26: ▼31,414
Location
Notes
- Passenger statistics from the Office of Rail and Road

Barton-on-Humber railway station serves the town of Barton-upon-Humber in North Lincolnshire, England.

The station is the terminus of the Barton line services operating from Cleethorpes. It is situated 22 3/4 miles (37 km) west of the resort. There is a connecting Stagecoach in Hull bus service from the town to Hull across the Humber Bridge which was introduced on the opening of the bridge to replace the New Holland Ferry.

Approach to the branch was by a triangular junction at New Holland which enabled passenger trains to operate a New Holland Pier to Barton service in connection with the ferries and rail services from Cleethorpes and for freight to have direct access from the main line via Ulceby Junction. When the Humber Bridge opened the junction was removed and passenger services operated directly from Cleethorpes via the new platform at New Holland.

== History ==
The station was opened as part of the branch line from New Holland to Barton-on-Humber in 1849. It was planned that the railway would extend westwards from Barton to Winterton and beyond, though this never happened. In the early years of the 20th century, plans were published, authorised in Parliament, and land bought and marked out on the ground, for the Barton Branch to link up with the North Lindsey Light Railway, at Winteringham. Initially, the plans were that the branch would join the Barton Branch via the coalyard, but this was later changed to an end on join to the 'main' line at Barton. People who owned property that would need to be demolished for this purpose were warned. Though the First World War was used as a reason to delay the extension, it was anticipated that post 1919, it would go ahead. A diversion of the A1077 was authorised for South Ferriby, and a crossing of Sluice Lane in Winteringham. Further pleas from Lindsey County Council, and the local MP were made to get the line built, including the reason of getting work for men to do in the 1920s. Even after the passenger service was withdrawn on the NLLR in 1925, the proposals were retained, and it was not until 1934 that plans to connect the Barton Branch and the NLLR were finally abandoned officially. At the same time as the proposal for a line from Winteringham to Barton was proposed, Immingham Docks was being built (started 1906, opened 1912). We can see the rationality of such a line for direct freight in to Immingham Docks - there was even talk of doubling the track on the Barton Branch, and a proposal for a new line direct from Barton to Goxhill so that the Goxhill - Immingham Docks Branch could serve the docks directly from Scunthorpe and Barton! Barton station was considerably larger until the early 1970s, but the old goods yard & buildings were all demolished by British Rail in 1973. The nearby bus station was added in 1981 when the Humber Bridge opened, whilst the station platform now in use was rebuilt to current specifications in 1998.

== Facilities ==
The station is unstaffed and has only basic amenities (waiting shelter, bench seating, bike rack and timetable poster board). Tickets have to be bought in advance or from the conductor on board the train. Step-free access is available from the entrance to the platform via ramp.

== Services ==
All services at Barton-on-Humber are operated by East Midlands Railway using Class 170 DMUs.

The typical off-peak service is one train every two hours to and from Cleethorpes which starts and terminates at Barton-on-Humber.

On Sundays, the station is served by four trains per day in each direction during the summer months only. No services call at the station on Sundays during the winter months.

Preceding station	National Rail	Following station
Terminus	East Midlands Railway Barton Line	Barrow Haven

== Sources ==
- King, Paul (2019). The Railways of North-east Lincolnshire, Part 2: Stations. Grimsby: Pyewipe Publications. ISBN 978-1-9164603-1-7.
