= Cleethorpes railway station =

Railway station in Lincolnshire, England

Cleethorpes
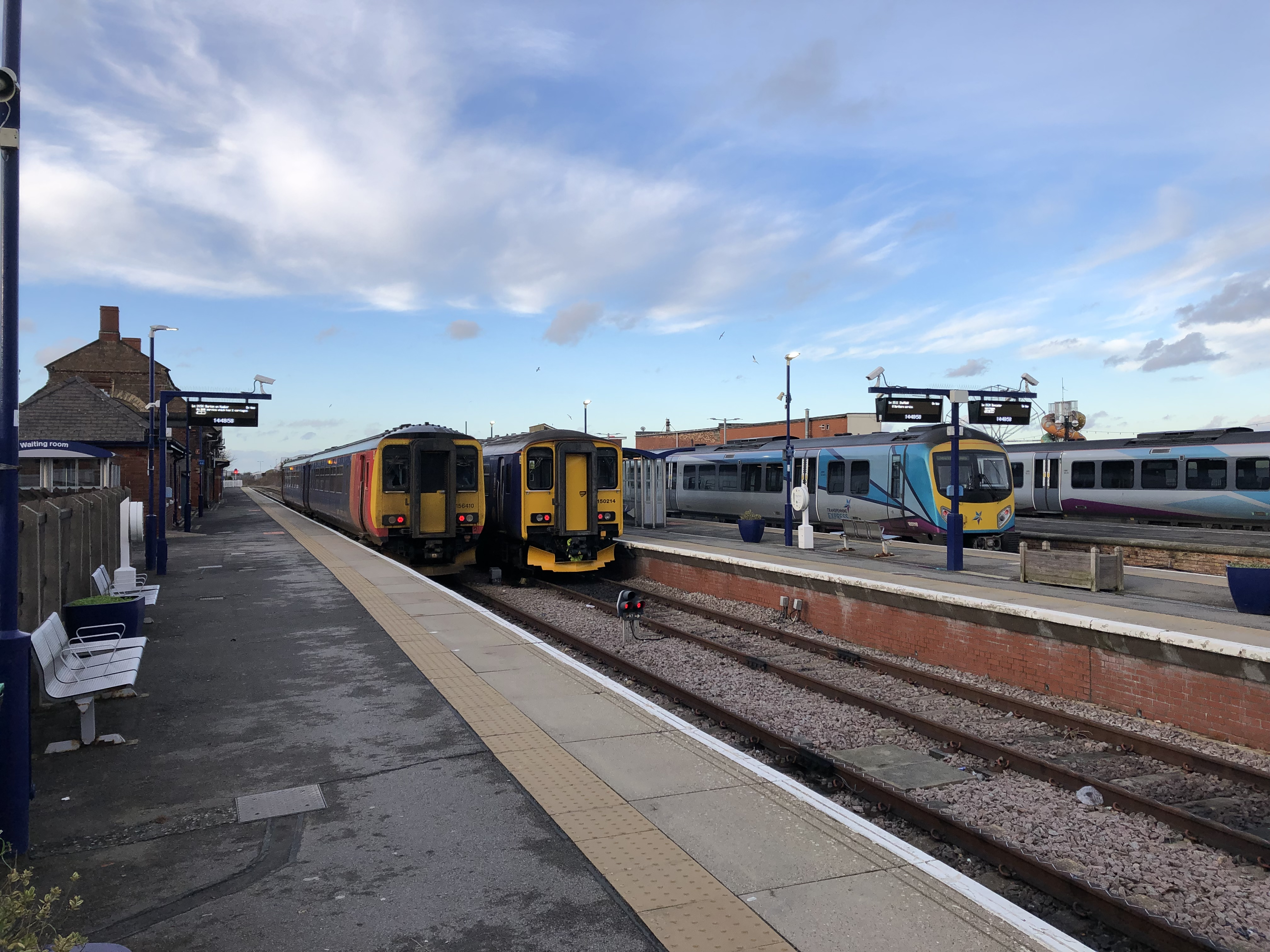
- Trains from the three train operating companies that serve Cleethorpes, January 2023.

General information
- Location: Cleethorpes, North East Lincolnshire, England
- Coordinates: 53.5626°N 0.029°W
- Grid reference: TA306090
- Manager: TransPennine Express
- Platforms: 4

Other information
- Station code: CLE
- Classification: DfT category D

History
- Original company: Manchester, Sheffield and Lincolnshire Railway
- Pre-grouping: Great Central Railway
- Post-grouping: London and North Eastern Railway

Key dates
- 6 April 1863: Opened

Passengers
- 2020/21: ▼68,322
- 2021/22: ▲0.228 million
- 2022/23: ▼0.195 million
- 2023/24: ▲0.253 million
- 2024/25: ▲0.307 million

Listed Building – Grade II
- Feature: Former Cleethorpes railway station buildings (1884)
- Designated: 17 September 1980
- Reference no.: 1161596
Location
Notes
- Passenger statistics from the Office of Rail and Road

Cleethorpes railway station serves the seaside town of Cleethorpes, in Lincolnshire, England. It is managed by TransPennine Express, with East Midlands Railway and Northern Trains services also using the station.

== History ==
The station opened on Easter Monday, 6 April 1863 when the Manchester, Sheffield and Lincolnshire Railway extended the line from Grimsby into the town.

The station buildings were constructed in 1884 with refreshment rooms and a clocktower by John Mann Lockerbie and Arthur Wilkinson of Birmingham. Prince Albert Victor, Duke of Clarence and Avondale used the station on 2 July 1885, when he visited Cleethorpes to open the promenade and gardens facing the sea constructed by H.B James CE of Westminster for the railway company.

The station layout was remodelled in 1889 to give six platforms and two carriage sidings extending in the direction of Grimsby. By 1891, the carriage sidings had been increased to six and extended to a new signal box at Suggitt's Lane. This layout also included a turntable to the rear of the signal box.

A 1910 report into work carried out the previous year refers to new crossovers to enable trains to arrive and depart from any platform. The signal box by this time had 100 levers and was jointly the third largest on the Great Central system with Marylebone. The original GCR station buildings on platform one were replaced by the current single storey structure on 14 July 1961, but they still stand and are now used as train crew accommodation.

Until 1985, the station and surrounding area were still controlled by a mechanical signal box with full semaphore signalling, including double track throughout to Grimsby and beyond. However, a resignalling scheme for the entire area saw the line to Grimsby singled and the number of platforms reduced to four (numbers 1–3 and 5). Platform 5 was renumbered 4 and the diesel fuelling road is what used to be platform 6. The signal box was closed and demolished; new colour light signals were installed, which were operated from a panel in the signal box at Pasture Street in Grimsby. In later works, the platform surfaces have been rebuilt to modern specifications. Since January 2016, all signalling here is supervised by the Rail Operating Centre at York. Platform 4 was out of service for several years but, since the summer of 2023, it has been returned to use following refurbishment works.

In the 1970s, Cleethorpes had a twice daily return service to London King's Cross, typically hauled by a Class 47, although Class 55 Deltics could be seen in the early 1980s after they were displaced from front-line duties on the East Coast Main Line. Latterly, until the service was withdrawn in the mid 1980s, there was a once-daily High Speed Train service to London.

Even after resignalling, until the withdrawal of locomotive hauled cross-Pennine services and the through London King's Cross service, evening time at Cleethorpes was a very busy time with most arrivals requiring cleaning through the carriage washer, fuelling on the small fuel point and shunting into the various departure positions for the following morning. Locomotives returned to the diesel depot at Immingham for overnight servicing; the HST from King's Cross was fuelled at the fuelling point at the rear of what used to be called Hawkeys Cafe, via a siding that went round the back of the Wash Plant control building and joined up with the old platform 6 road.

The station building on platform 1 was deemed unsafe and closed in 2001, leaving only platforms 2 and 3 in use. Platform 1 had reopened by 2007 and all platforms were fitted with new information displays. Other platforms at the station remain unused and are in a state of neglect as sand has blown from the nearby beach onto the lines and formed drifts.

First TransPennine Express built a small depot, to provide stabling, light maintenance and refuelling at Cleethorpes for its DMU fleet. The Class 156 units used by East Midlands Railway do not berth here overnight, but work in and out either in service or empty from Lincoln.

In January 2021, the Department for Transport opened a consultation on proposals to improve services around Manchester and improve reliability with the options proposed by the Manchester Recovery Taskforce. Options B and C proposed the Manchester Airport to Cleethorpes service be diverted to Liverpool Lime Street via Manchester Piccadilly instead of running to the airport, providing a direct link to Liverpool and Warrington. If either of these options was chosen, the changes would come into force in May 2022. In October 2021, a preferred option, Option B+ was announced and it involved the new Liverpool to Cleethorpes service replacing the Manchester Airport service if proposals were agreed; they duly came into operation from December 2022.

== Facilities ==
The station is fully staffed, with the ticket office open from 06:45-19:30 Mondays to Saturdays and 09:00-19:30 on Sundays. A self-service ticket machine is provided on the concourse for use outside these times and for collecting pre-paid tickets. There are toilets, a waiting room and a public house also located on the concourse. Customer help points, timetable posters and CIS displays are located on both the concourse and each platform. All platforms have step-free access.

The station has the PlusBus scheme where train and bus tickets can be bought together at saving, it is in the same area as Grimsby Town, Grimsby Docks and New Clee stations.

== Platforms ==
- Platform 1 is normally used by TransPennine Express services to Liverpool Lime Street
- Platform 2 for East Midlands Railway services to Barton-on-Humber
- Platform 3 is usually used only for early morning and late evening TransPennine Express services, and the Northern Trains weekday service to Sheffield via Brigg and Retford
- Platform 4 used for Stabling on Sundays Only, and for normal use by TransPennine Express services to Liverpool Lime Street, and occasionally used by East Midlands Railway during weekdays

== Services ==
Services at Cleethorpes are operated by three train operating companies, with typical off-peak services as follows:

- TransPennine Express operates an hourly service to Liverpool Lime Street via Doncaster, Sheffield and Manchester Piccadilly along their South TransPennine route via the South Humberside Main Line, the Hope Valley Line and Liverpool South Parkway. On Sundays, the service is also hourly, though starting later in the morning.
- East Midlands Railway operates a two-hourly stopping service to Barton-on-Humber via the Barton Line, as well as a two-hourly to Matlock via Nottingham and Lincoln. On Sundays, there are three trains per day to Matlock all year and four to Barton-on-Humber during the summer months only.
- Northern Trains operates a limited service of one train per day to Sheffield via Brigg which operates on Mondays to Fridays only.

=== Proposed future services ===
London North Eastern Railway intended to commence direct services between Cleethorpes and London (via Lincoln) in December 2024, using bi-mode Class 800 trains. A test train called at Grimsby Town on 26 June 2023; however, no London service is in the December 2024 timetable, and despite substantial local support, as of October 2024 plans are 'on hold'.

In March 2025, Grand Central applied for permission to operate trains between Cleethorpes and London King's Cross (via Scunthorpe), 'from as early as December 2026', should permission be granted. This proposed service would consist of four new return services per day, formed by the extension of existing Grand Central services which call at Doncaster.

As of March 2026 the Grand Central application is still pending, following 'extended discussions' with Network Rail: it was confirmed that, should permission be granted to operate, Class 180 DMU trains would be used until brand-new Class 820 tri-mode (diesel/electric/battery) trains could be brought into service in 2028.

Preceding station	National Rail	Following station
New Clee	East Midlands Railway: Grimsby–Lincoln–Newark line	Terminus
Grimsby Town	East Midlands Railway Barton Line	Terminus
Grimsby Town	TransPennine Express: South Humberside Main Line; (South TransPennine)	Terminus
Grimsby Town	Northern Trains Brigg Branch Line Limited service	Terminus
