= Port of Grimsby =

Port in United Kingdom

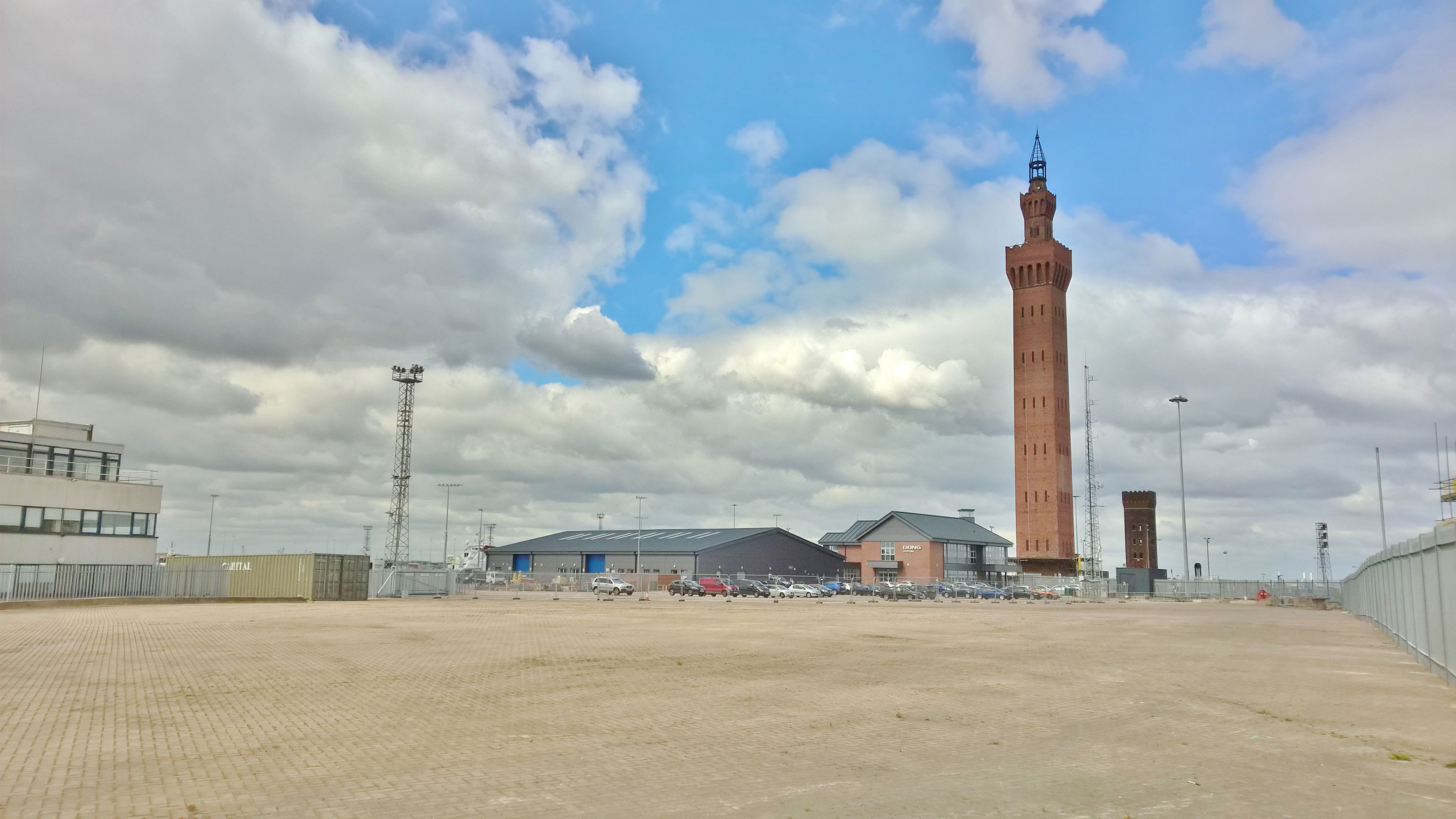
- Grimsby Dock Tower
- Interactive map of Port of Grimsby

Location
- Location: Grimsby
- Coordinates: 53°34′40″N 0°04′28″W

Statistics
- Website www.portofgrimsby.com www.abports.co.uk

The Port of Grimsby is located on the south bank of the Humber Estuary at Grimsby in North East Lincolnshire. Sea trade out of Grimsby dates to at least the medieval period. The Grimsby Haven Company began dock development in the late 1700s, and the port was further developed from the 1840s onwards by the Manchester, Sheffield and Lincolnshire Railway (MSLR) and its successors. The port has had three main dock systems:

The earliest dock, or Old Dock was developed in the 1790s, downriver from the medieval Haven, on the outfall of the same water course; in around 1880 it was expanded westwards, and renamed Alexandra Dock, being connected to the Royal Dock system by a short canal, named the Union Dock. From the 1880s the dock's focus was coal, later timber. From the 1970s onwards the dock has been used for large-scale car importation.

The Royal Dock was developed from the 1840s onwards, contemporary with the arrival of the railway – it was built on a large area of land reclaimed from the Humber Estuary north-east of the original town and harbour. The dock's trade has included a wide variety of goods including coal, timber and general merchandise.

The third dock system is the Fish docks, all of which exit(ed) from the same lock(s) onto the Humber close to and east of the Royal Dock lock. The first fish dock ("No.1") was built 1857, and expanded southward in 1878 with the addition of a second ("No.2"); both were built within the land reclaimed as part of the Royal Dock development. In 1934 a third fish ("No.3") dock substantially expanded the No.1 dock, and reclaimed additional land from the Humber. The Fish docks and nearby estate were devoted to the landing of fish, and maintenance, supply and repair of the Grimsby fishing fleet, which grew into one of the largest in Britain. The fishing industry collapsed in the 1970s due to outside factors.

The Grimsby Haven Company was re-incorporated as the Grimsby Dock Company, which amalgamated in 1846 with several railway companies into the MSLR, later known as the Great Central Railway (GCR). The GCR (and docks) became part of the London and North Eastern Railway (LNER) during the 1923 Grouping. In 1948 nationalisation formed the British Transport Commission from which British Transport Docks Board was split in 1962. Privatisation by the Transport Act 1981 formed Associated British Ports, the present owner of the port.

As of 2015 the port is a major car importation location, as well as an offshore wind farm servicing hub, and handles other cargos including timber, minerals, metals and dry bulks.

== History ==
=== Early history ===
Grimsby's development as a landing place and town has an underlying basis in the area's geography – the combination of relatively high ground (compared to surrounding land) of over 16 feet (5 m), near to the Humber, and close to a water outfall (The Haven).

Grimsby has been documented as a landing place dating to at least the Viking Age. According to 19th century writers Grimsby was referenced in medieval histories as the landing place of marauding Danish armies. The haven is also reputed to be the landing place of the semi-legendary figures Grim and Havelok in the town's founding myth, Havelok the Dane (written c. 13th century). In the second year of the reign of King John (12th century) he visited the town and conferred on its inhabitants the right that "they should be exempt from toll and lastage, stallage, moorage, haustage, and passage, in every town and seaport throughout England, except the city of London ..", the town was also granted the right of a ferry in the same year. Henry III granted the town a ferry across the Humber, as well as a charter of merchandise.

Records of trade with Scandinavian countries date to the 11th century, with furs, wool, and falcons being traded. Importation of pine and oil from Norway is recorded from the early 13th century; grain was exported. Fish and fishmongery in Grimsby are well documented as a part of trade and business from at least the late 12th century, and continued as important until the 16th century.

In the 13th century, the people of Grimsby came into dispute with the people of the then-thriving port town of Ravenserodd over the alleged 'hijacking', either by persuasion or force, of trade intended for Grimsby to the port of Ravenserodd. An inquisition into the rivalry was held in 1290 by order of Edward II. Later, during Edward II's war with France, the Mayor and bailiffs were commanded to equip Grimsby ship, place them under the command of James Kingston, and then patrol the coast of eastern England, capturing and impounding any French or allied vessels.

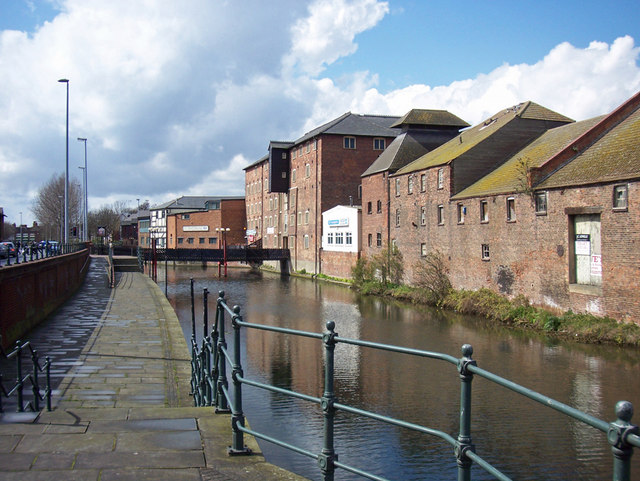
The West Haven (River Freshney) and 18th century maltings (2008)

The Haven and was prone to silting, and in 1280 proposals were made to divert the River Freshney to scour the harbour. By 1341, a new haven, the West Haven had been constructed, (Note: 53.567135°N 0.085054°W, West Haven, c.1341) excavated from former pasture land.

During the 14th and 15th century, trade with Scandinavia declined, in part due to Hansa competition, whilst trade with the Low Countries increased, during this period the port faced increased competition from the developing ports at Hull and Boston. As continental trade decreased, fishing and general coastal trade increased in importance for the port.

Icelandic fishing and importation of timber from Norway took place but declined from the 15th to 17th centuries. By the end of the 18th century the place had greatly decreased in importance as a port, and many of what remained of the inhabitants got a living from the land. The population had diminished from around 1,500 persons in 1400 to an estimated 850 in 1524, and 399 in the early 1700s. de la Pryme visited in 1697 and noted the towns decline.

Grimsby is at present but a little poor town, not a quarter so great as heretofore. [...] Three things may be assign'd to its decay. First, the destruction of the haven, which was in former times a fine larg [sic] river [.] That which destroy'd it was the Humber's wearing away the huge cliff at Cleythorp, and bringing it and casting it all into Grimsby haven or river, and all along Grimsby coast to the north, so that the river was not onely fill'd thereby, but also a huge bay on the north side of the town[..] The second [] was the destruction of the religious houses there [..] The third thing which occasiond it's decay was the rise of Hull, which having first of all the priviledges and advantages above other towns, and a fine haven to boot, robbed them all not onely of all their traffic, but also of their chief tradesmen.

— de la Pryme (1697).

De la Pryme noted efforts to unblock the haven on his visit, and in the same period work was underway to divert and use the Freshney to scour the West Haven.

Parts of the haven are now listed structures, as are maltings on the quayside, parts of which date to the late 1700s.

=== The Old Dock (1796–1880) ===
Great Grimsby (Lincoln) Harbour Act 1796
- Act of Parliament
- Parliament of Great Britain
- Long title: An act for widening, deepening, enlarging, altering, and improving the haven of the town and port of Great Grimsby, in the county of Lincoln.
- Citation: 36 Geo. 3. c. 98
- Territorial extent: Great Britain

Dates
- Royal assent: 14 May 1796
- Commencement: 14 May 1796 (Note: The Acts of Parliament (Commencement) Act 1793.)
- Repealed: 1 August 1849
Other legislation
| Amended by | Grimsby Haven Navigation and Improvement Act 1799; Grimsby Docks Act 1845 |
| Repealed by | Manchester, Sheffield and Lincolnshire Railway Act 1849 |

Status: Repealed

Text of statute as originally enacted

Plans to re-engineer the haven and create a new dock were put forward from the late 1800s. Pickernell produced a plan for a dock in 1787. It was not until the Great Grimsby (Lincoln) Harbour Act 1796 (36 Geo. 3. c. 98) was enacted, creating the Grimsby Haven company. The act noted that the River ('Haven') at Grimsby was warped (silted) up, preventing most ships docking transferring cargo subject to the state of the tides, and so, suggested widening, deepening, and straightening the haven, installing a lock to impound water within the lock, and redirecting the flow of the Freshney (and of springs known as Blow Wells (Note: Commonly known as "blows" or "boils" when encountered in dock construction – freshwater springs are commonly found when excavating below the level of clay in the low lying areas adjacent to the Yorkshire and Lincolnshire wolds. Also common on the north bank of the Humber. See also Artesian Well)) to scour and fill the lock, allowing larger vessels reliable harbourage at the town. The act sought permission to create a company to fulfil these task, which would also be responsible for erection of wharfs, warehouses; maintenance; tolls and so on; and to gain authority for compulsory purchase of lands required for the works. The acts also set out the regulation of the said company, and gave the company certain rights to make bye-laws relating to the operation of the dock. The act permitted the raising of £20,000, and a further £10,000 in contingency.

Grimsby Haven Navigation and Improvement Act 1799
- Act of Parliament
- Parliament of Great Britain
- Long title: An act for enabling the Grimsby haven company to finish and complete the navigation of the said haven, and for amending an act passed in the thirty-sixth year of the reign of his present Majesty, for widening, deepening, enlarging, altering, and improving, the haven of the town and port of Great Grimsby, in the county of Lincoln.
- Citation: 39 Geo. 3. c. lxx
- Territorial extent: Great Britain

Dates
- Royal assent: 12 July 1799
- Commencement: 12 July 1799
- Repealed: 8 August 1845
Other legislation
| Amends | Great Grimsby (Lincoln) Harbour Act 1796 |
| Repealed by | Grimsby Docks Act 1845 |

Status: Repealed

Text of statute as originally enacted

Construction took place from 1797 to 1800 under John Rennie. George Joyce was initially resident engineer, but was replaced by James Hollinsworth who was present 1800 to 1801. The dock construction required hollow dock walls on piled foundations which were designed in account of the weak ground conditions at the dock site. The cost of the works was £60,000. As built the locked canal was 1.5 miles (2.4 km) long, (Note: 53.571611°N 0.082539°W, Old Dock, 1801) with a single lock 126 by 36 feet (38 by 11 m) long by wide, with a depth at the walls of 27 feet (8.2 m). The dock works were carried out under the shield of a coffer dam outside the new lock, with extensive use of piling under the lock and wall constructions. Use of piles was attempted under the lock pit bottom but the ground was too fluid for this to be successful and an inverted arch was employed instead Further expansion was required, and a further act, the Grimsby Haven Navigation and Improvement Act 1799 (39 Geo. 3. c. lxx) was obtained, which allowed the construction of an expansion of the dock of 3 acres (1.2 ha). The expansion was completed in 1804.

The dock had a depth of water of 18 feet (5.5 m) reducing to 14 feet (4.3 m) towards the town, and to 12 feet (3.7 m) on the west branch of the dock (1846); silting required the dock to be periodically cleared, which had been done in 1826, by hand, and later in the 1840s by machine dredger of approximately 30 to 40 horsepower (22 to 30 kW). Between 3 and 6 feet (0.91 and 1.83 m) of mud was removed from the dock in 1826.

After opening there was an initial growth of the town when three streets, later renamed Victoria Street, Burgess Street and King Edward Street, were laid out parallel to the dock, but from 1811 to 1841 the rate of expansion was no different from the rest of Lincolnshire; the port lacked any rail connection until the 1840s. By the 1850s, the dock was involved in trade with the Baltic region, including timber, deal, tar, seeds, bones, and iron. Dock fees were less than those in Hull.

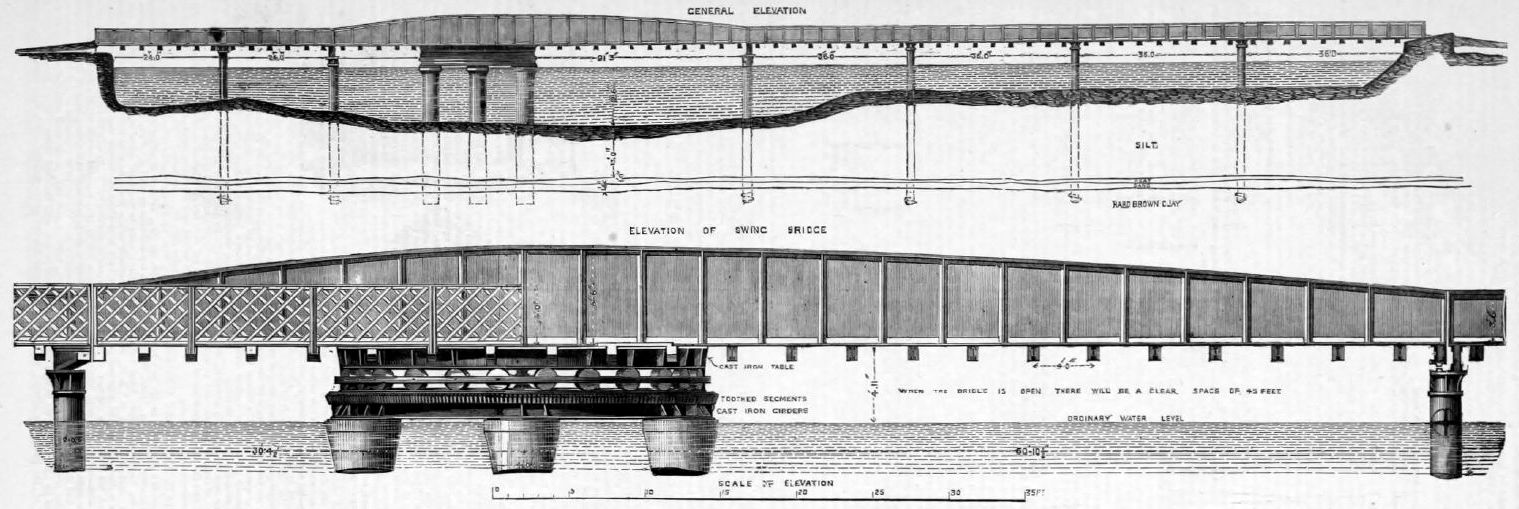
1872 swing bridge

In 1869, the Grimsby Improvement Act 1869 (32 & 33 Vict. c. x) allowed the land west of the Old Dock to be developed, and a bridge, known as Corporation Bridge, built across the dock. The bridge was constructed by Head Wrightson and the Teesdale Ironworks to the design of Charles Sacre. The bridge was supported on concrete filled screw piles, with two spans of 24 feet (7.3 m) and four of 36 feet (11 m). Situated between the two sets of spans was a horizontally turning swing bridge of 91.25 feet (27.81 m) of asymmetric hogback plate girder design with a clear space when open of 45 feet (14 m). The bridge opened in 1872.

In 1873 the Manchester, Sheffield and Lincolnshire Railway was enabled by the Manchester, Sheffield and Lincolnshire Railway Act 1873 (36 & 37 Vict. c. lxxvii) to build a short line connecting from their line (Great Grimsby and Sheffield Junction Railway) near Great Coates to the Old Dock. Logan and Hemingway obtained the contract to construct the line with a bid of £3,984, and construction began in November 1878. The line (Great Coates branch) opened 27 March 1879. (Note: On the 1889 OS map labelled as the M.S.L.R Grimsby Docks Branch.)

In 1880 the dock was modernised and extended substantially to the west, forming the Alexandra Dock. A short canal dock, the Union Dock was opened in 1879, connecting the Old Dock system, to the Royal Dock system.

The dock's lock was closed in 1917 and later infilled.

==== Alexandra Dock (1880–) ====
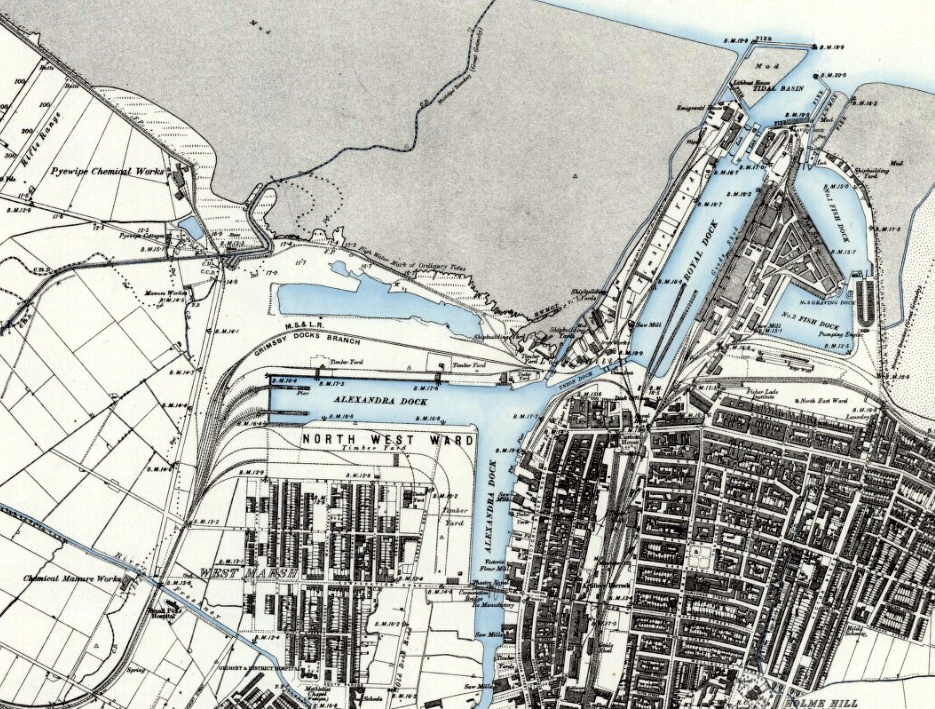
Grimsby, Ordnance Survey 6 inch map, Lincolnshire 22NE c. 1887. Alexandra Dock extension (centre left); Royal and Fish docks (top right)

In 1873 the dock owners, the Manchester, Sheffield and Lincolnshire Railway acquired 105 acres (42 ha) of land to the west of the Old Dock. A scheme for dock creation at South Killingholme near Immingham by Charles Liddell was considered as an alternative, but rejected. In December Logan and Hemingway became contractors for an expansion of the Old Dock. the works included an expansion of the 1789 Old Dock, plus a large western arm 26 acres (11 ha) extending from near the entrance. (Note: 53.575954°N 0.086841°W, Alexandra Dock, 1880 (Old Dock west extension))

In honor of a visit by the Prince and Princess of Wales (Edward VII and Alexandra of Denmark) to the town in July 1879 the new dock was named Alexandra Dock. The expanded dock was filled with water in November 1879, and reported complete in July 1880. Contracts for handling equipment, and jetties and coal drops, as well as a swing bridge across the Old Dock's lock were let soon after. The bridge connected rail lines from the Great Coates branch to lines on the west side of the Royal Dock.

In the 1920s a replacement bridge across the dock (Corporation Bridge) was constructed to the design of Alfred C. Gardner, docks engineer of the LNER, constructed by Sir William Arrol & Co. (Glasgow). The bridge consists of four spans, one of which is an electrically powered lifting section on the Scherzer rolling lift principle. The bridge was formally opened by the Prince of Wales (Edward VIII) on 19 July 1925. The bridge was listed in 1999. (Note: 53.570787°N 0.082883°W, Corporation Bridge (1872))

By the 1930s one of the two original coal drops was out of operation, with coal handling at the port being transferred to new equipment at the Royal Dock. By the 1950s both coal drops had been removed, with the embankments remaining; cargo handling at the dock had shifted to timber; by the end of the 1960s the timber trade had also declined.

In 1975 Grimsby was selected as the UK importation point for Volkswagen and a car terminal was opened on Alexandra Dock in 1975.

=== Royal and Fish Docks ===
==== Background and construction of cofferdam (1846–48) ====
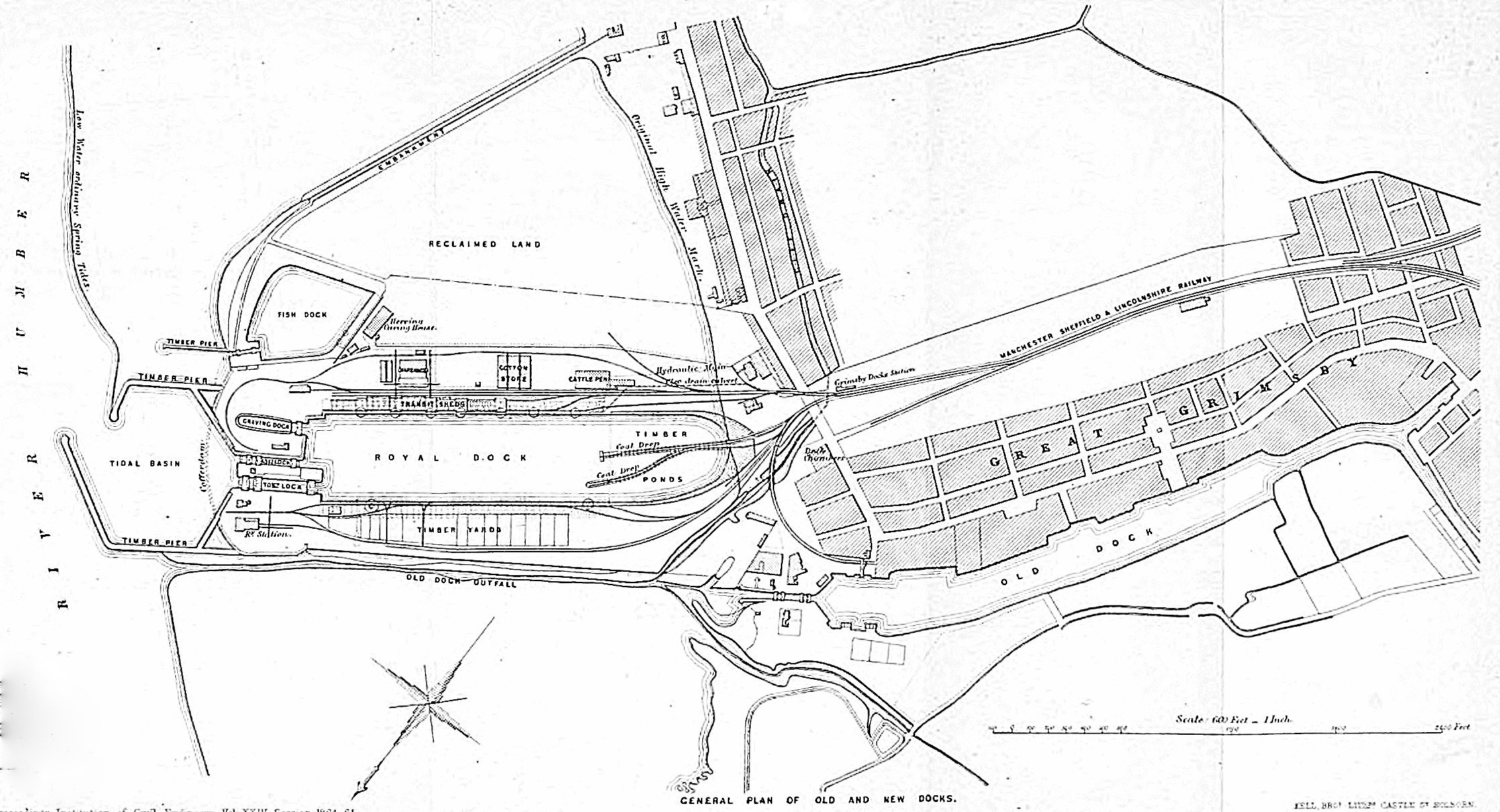
The new Royal and first Fish dock, c. 1864. showing (left to right) Humber, low water mark, basin piers, docks, railway and town (up is south-east)

James Rendel was requested to draw up plans for new docks in 1843. His design placed docks on the extensive mudflats between high and low water north of the town – as planned 132 acres (53 ha) were to be enclosed or reclaimed, of which 27 acres (11 ha) would be water within the docks, with 20 acres (8.1 ha) for wharfage, and 85 acres (34 ha) of land for other buildings. The main dock was to be connected to the Humber by a basin of 11 acres (4.5 ha) bounded by piers of open construction to the east and west each of approximately 600 feet (180 m). The dock's entrance was to have two locks, one large and one small, Rendel also proposed a canal connecting the old and new docks, both for ships and to supply the new docks with fresh water. Part of the basis of the design was to expose the dock entrance to the flow of tides for the greatest amount of time to increase scouring of the entrance, additionally Rendel supposed that the encroachment of the dock onto the Humber might constrict the flow of water in the vicinity of the "Inner Roads" to increase the flow, and thence scouring, so as to increase the depth of the navigable channel. Rendel also suggested reclaiming and extending eastwards the shallows at the Burcom Bank shoal north-west of Grimsby to further funnel the tidal flows. Total cost of the works was estimated at £500,000, of which £300,000 for the dock works, and up to £200,000 for the breakwaters if carried out. To make the plan economically sensible Rendel proposed that the inner expansion of the docks would be carried out piecemeal, with only 7 acres (2.8 ha) of docks built at the initial phase.

At an inquest into the state of harbours undertaken by the Tidal Harbours Commission in 1846 the opinion was expressed that if Grimsby the new dock as well as better inland communications it would become the popular and natural fishing port for the east coast.

Grimsby Docks Act 1845 (Note: Section 7.)
- Act of Parliament
- Parliament of the United Kingdom
- Long title: An Act for making additional Docks and other Works at the Haven of the Town and Port of Great Grimsby; and for amending the Acts relating to the said Haven.
- Citation: 8 & 9 Vict. c. ccii
- Territorial extent: United Kingdom

Dates
- Royal assent: 8 August 1845
- Commencement: 8 August 1845 (Note: Section 1.)
- Repealed: 1 August 1849
Other legislation
| Amends | Great Grimsby (Lincoln) Harbour Act 1796 |
| Repeals/revokes | Grimsby Haven Navigation and Improvement Act 1799 |
| Repealed by | Manchester, Sheffield and Lincolnshire Railway Act 1849 |

Status: Repealed

Text of statute as originally enacted

The work was enabled by the Grimsby Docks Act 1845 (8 & 9 Vict. c. ccii). As part of the act the Grimsby Haven company was dissolved, and the business re-incorporated as the Grimsby Dock Company. The company's plans were enabled by a close association with the Great Grimsby and Sheffield Junction Railway (GG&SJ), a company planning to create railway lines from Grimsby and the north Lincolnshire coast to Gainsborough, and connections with the main rail network. The two companies shared several board members and a chairman; the Grimsby Dock company voted to amalgamate with the GG&SJ at its first general meeting.

On 1 January 1847, the Manchester, Sheffield and Lincolnshire Railway Act 1846 (9 & 10 Vict. c. cclxviii) amalgamated the dock company, the Sheffield, Ashton-under-Lyne and Manchester Railway, the Great Grimsby and Sheffield Junction Railway, the Sheffield and Lincolnshire Junction Railway and the Sheffield and Lincolnshire Extension Railway companies into the Manchester, Sheffield & Lincolnshire Railway.

Work on the dock began in 1846, to the designs of Rendel, with Adam Smith as resident engineer. Contractors for the dock works were Hutching, Brown and Wright. The initial main work was construction of a large cofferdam surrounding the worksite. The dam was constructed of three rows of wooden piles of Baltic yellow pine (Memel fir.), 6 and 7 feet (1.8 and 2.1 m) apart, between 18 and 15 inches (460 and 380 mm) square, piledriven until hard clay was reached. Piles were between 45 and 55 feet (14 and 17 m) with some longer – the outer row was inclined to the vertical at 1 in 24. The inner space was filed with chalkstone and clay for the first 5 feet (1.5 m) then with puddled clay. The inside of the dam was buttressed by additional rows, spaced every 25 feet (7.6 m) of wall, of closely piled wooden piles extending back 18 feet (5.5 m); the intermediate space of wall was supported by horizontal diagonal struts from the inner walls to buttresses. The embankments to the east and west of the dam with were made with piled stones and clay.

By 1848 an area of 138 acres (56 ha) was enclosed from the sea. A 20 feet (6.1 m) wide gated opening on the east side allowed access for construction ships. The dam was approximately 1,600 feet (490 m) long, with a construction cost of £29 per foot. The total length of dam, wharves, and embankments approached 1.5 miles (2.4 km). Contractor for the cofferdams was Messrs. Lynn (Liverpool). The work was described in a paper read to the Institution of Civil Engineers, obtaining a favourable reception from its vice-president:

Mr. Cubitt said [] he could offer nothing, except a general expression of admiration of the extent of the works, [] as a dam, it was the longest, strongest, the deepest, and the soundest work of the kind he had ever seen.

— Joseph Cubitt, 1849.

==== Construction of Royal Dock (1849–1852) ====
17 April 1849 Albert, Prince Consort laid the first stone of the dock, an 11-ton stone forming part of the structure of the lock gates. The enclosed area had been drained by two 35 horsepower (26 kW) pumps – on a number of occasions fresh water springs were encountered, which were managed by enclosing the spring in a cast-iron pipe, and by surrounding the area with chalkstone.

Two main locks were constructed, adjacent to one another, of 300 by 70 feet (91 by 21 m) and 200 by 45 feet (61 by 14 m) with the bases 6 and 6.75 feet (1.83 and 2.06 m) below low water respectively. The lock's foundations were excavated to 8 feet (2.4 m) below the bottom of the locks, supported on wooden piles 1 by 35 feet (0.30 by 10.67 m) square by long, and a bed of concrete. The lock pit invert and supports for the lock gates were of stone. Each lock had a pair of outer (pen) gates and a single inner (flood) gates, all built of timber, reinforced by wrought iron. The dock's quaysides were built on chalk rubble filled brick arches parallel to the dock of approximately 27 feet (8.2 m) width, with the arches on piers of 6 feet (1.8 m) width supported by piling, with wider piers under areas expected to support the heaviest loads – the walls facing the dock were faced with masonry.

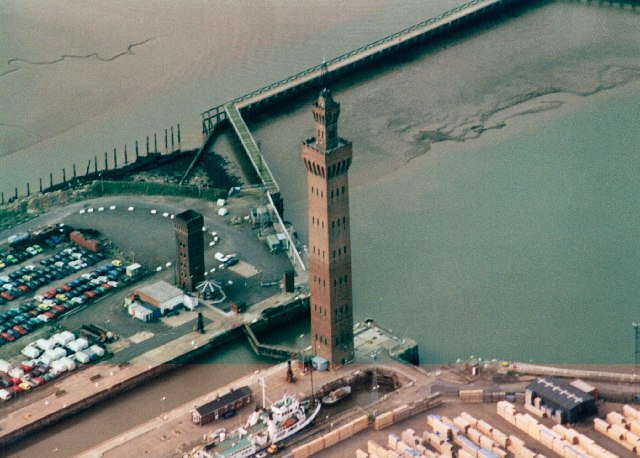
Dock hydraulic tower and locks (1999)

Moving equipment for the dock gates was supplied by W. Armstrong. The hydraulic power supply for the equipment was a 200 feet (61 m) high water tower (Grimsby Dock tower), charged by a 25 horsepower (19 kW) horizontal engine. The hydraulic tower was built on the centre pier between the two locks, of plain brick, 28 feet (8.5 m) square at the base. (Note: 53.583185°N 0.070410°W, Dock tower (Royal Dock locks central pier)) Its water tank was located at 200 feet (61 m) and contained 33,000 imperial gallons (150,000 L; 40,000 US gal). The tower's architectural design was by J.W. Wild and was inspired by Italian buildings, in particular the town hall of Siena (Torre del Mangia in the Palazzo Pubblico).

A 13 acres (5.3 ha) tidal basin outside the locks was formed by two timber piers, with an entrance 260 feet (79 m) wide. The cost of the dock works (to 1863) was estimated at £600,000; rising to £1,000,000 when accounting for the cost of purchase of the Old Docks, Fish Dock, and interest payments. The dock opened in 1852. (Note: 53.580318°N 0.072563°W, Royal Dock (1852)) On 18 March a banquet was held in the large lock pit, and water was admitted on 22 March, and the dock opened on 27 May 1852. The dock's railway lines of 2 miles (3.2 km) which included lines for the Grimsby Docks railway station and Grimsby Pier railway station were completed by 1 August 1853. Queen Victoria and Albert, Prince Consort visited Grimsby on 14 October 1854, arriving from Hull on the Royal Yacht Fairy, being received at the Pier station. A request for the new dock to be named Royal Dock in honour of the visit was given, and accepted.

==== History of the Royal Dock (1852–present) ====
Installations added after the opening of the dock included a graving dock, and facilities for handling rail borne coal shipments. The two coal drops and rail lines were built over the far end of the dock on timber piers. the first was completed by 1856 at a cost of £3,435, the second, at £3,500, soon after. The 350 feet (110 m) graving dock was built east of the dock's lock, with an entrance of 70 feet (21 m). The design was by Adam Smith, and was contracted to James Taylor (Manchester) for £32,000 in 1855, the work was completed by 1858. Initially a Cornish engine from Perran Foundry (Cornwall) was installed to fill the dock with water from wells, but its use ended when the well's water supply failed.

A short canal dock, the Union Dock was opened in 1879, connecting the Old Dock system, to the Royal Dock system

A large transit shed 900 by 178 feet (274 by 54 m) was added to the west side of the dock, opened March 1893. The shed was authorised 1890 at a cost of £23,500 and contracted to Pearson and Knowles (Warrington). A new hydraulic coal hoist and sidings were added to the south-west side of the dock in the last years of the 19th century at a cost of £11,000 – the installation became operational in 1899. (Note: The Brickpit Coal sidings were added on the Great Coates branch on the site of former timber yards.)

A roll-on/roll-off ramp (a linkspan) was constructed in the north-east part of the dock c. 1966. In the 1970s an access road and bridge was built across the smaller lock, restricting use of the lock.

In 2013 DONG Energy selected the Royal Dock as an operation and maintenance centre for the Westermost Rough Wind Farm. As part of the agreement new pontoons and lock gates were to be installed. In 2014 the lock gates at the dock were replaced by contractor Ravestein (Netherlands). The conversion away from gates partially supported by buoyancy lifted the opening restrictions to times of high water, allowing 24hr operations. The floating pontoon berth was sited in the north-east corner of the dock, at the site of the (1966) roll-on/roll-of ramp. The operations and maintenance centre was to be sited adjacent to the berth on the north-east corner of the quayside.

Parts of the dock's wall, the locks, the dock tower, and several nearby structures are all now listed structures.

==== Fish Docks (1857–) ====
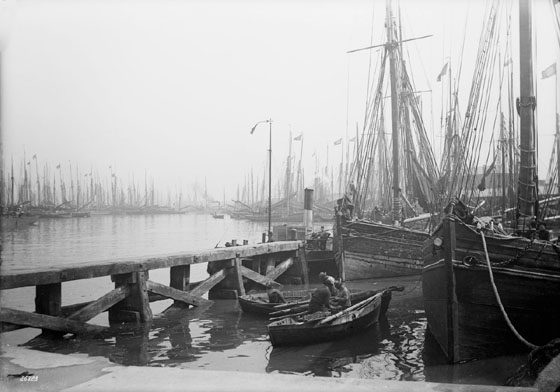
Fish docks, Grimsby (c. 1890)

The Fish Docks consist of a number of docks sharing common lock entrances, east of the Royal Dock, built and expanded in stages from the mid 19th century onwards.

===== No.1 Dock (1857–) =====
The first fishing dock (later No.1 Fish Dock) was authorised in late 1854, and the construction contract awarded to Sissons at £6,996; the dock was completed early 1856. It was constructed to the east of the Royal Dock, and incorporated the floodgates of the original cofferdam at lock gates. The dock's lock was 80 by 20 feet (24.4 by 6.1 m) with a depth at high spring tides of 15.5 feet (4.7 m). As built the dock's sides were of chalkstone covered sloped clay at with a 1 in 3 rise, at the south side a 400 feet (120 m) timber wharf was built, which was rail connected by a sunken line allowing direct loading of wagons from the wharf. A timber pier was built to the east of the dock's entrance. The dock was built at a cost of £12,000, with a water area of approximately 6 acres (2.4 ha). (Note: 53.581588°N 0.065642°W, No.1 Fish Dock (1857))

The new dock opened in 1857. Fishermen were encouraged to move to the new port; the Grimsby Deep Sea Fishing Company had already been established (1854) for this purpose, backed by Great Central Railway, and later Great Northern Railway and Midland Railway. An ice house and worker's housing were also built in the 1850s to support the industry.

The Fish Dock was extended in 1866; doubling the dock's area. A second lock and further quay space and warehousing were contracted to Logan and Hemingway, c. 1871; the firm also received the contract for a graving dock, valued at £15,000 in 1872. The pier at the dock was lengthened in 1873. The lock and graving dock were operational by 1875.

The fish market on the dock was destroyed by fire in June 1918. Contracts for new fish markets were awarded in 1919: one of £43,878 to A. Jackaman & Sons for work on the west side of the dock; and one of £13,113 to G.A. Pillatt & Son for the north side. Reconstruction of the northern end of the fish market on the west side of the dock was completed by January 1921. Reconstruction work on the fish market continued through 1922 to 1923.

In 1934 a new dock, No.3, was opened, contiguous with No.1, expanded the water area of 13 acres (5.3 ha) by 37 acres (15 ha)

===== No.2 Dock and Humber Cruising Association (1878–) =====
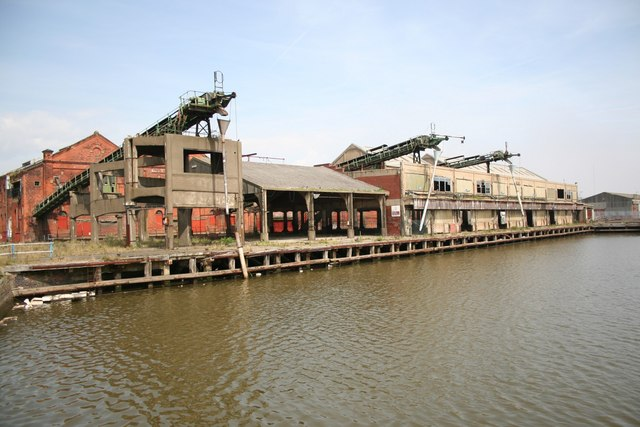
No.2 dock, derelict dock buildings (2007)

In 1876 Logan and Hemingway were awarded a £23,000 contract for an expansion from the first fish dock. The 11 acres (4.5 ha) No. 2 Fish Dock was opened in 1878, connecting at the south end of the extended No.1 Fish Dock. (Note: 53.577898°N 0.067701°W, No.2 Fish Dock (1878))

The dock was enlarged to 16 acres (6.5 ha) at the southern end between 1897 and 1900; the expansion scheme included the addition of two coal hoists for loading. H.B. James (Grimsby) was awarded the dock wall and excavations contracts. The dock expansion also necessitated the realignment of the Grimsby to Cleethorpes railway line to the south.

A RYA affiliated sailing club, Humber Cruising Association, (HCA) operates a marina (Meridian Quay Marina) using the northern half of No.2 dock. The marina is used by members of HCA, as well as having some moorings for around 20 visitors. HCA has hard-standing for yachts, a travel hoist, a fuel berth as well as a club house and bar.

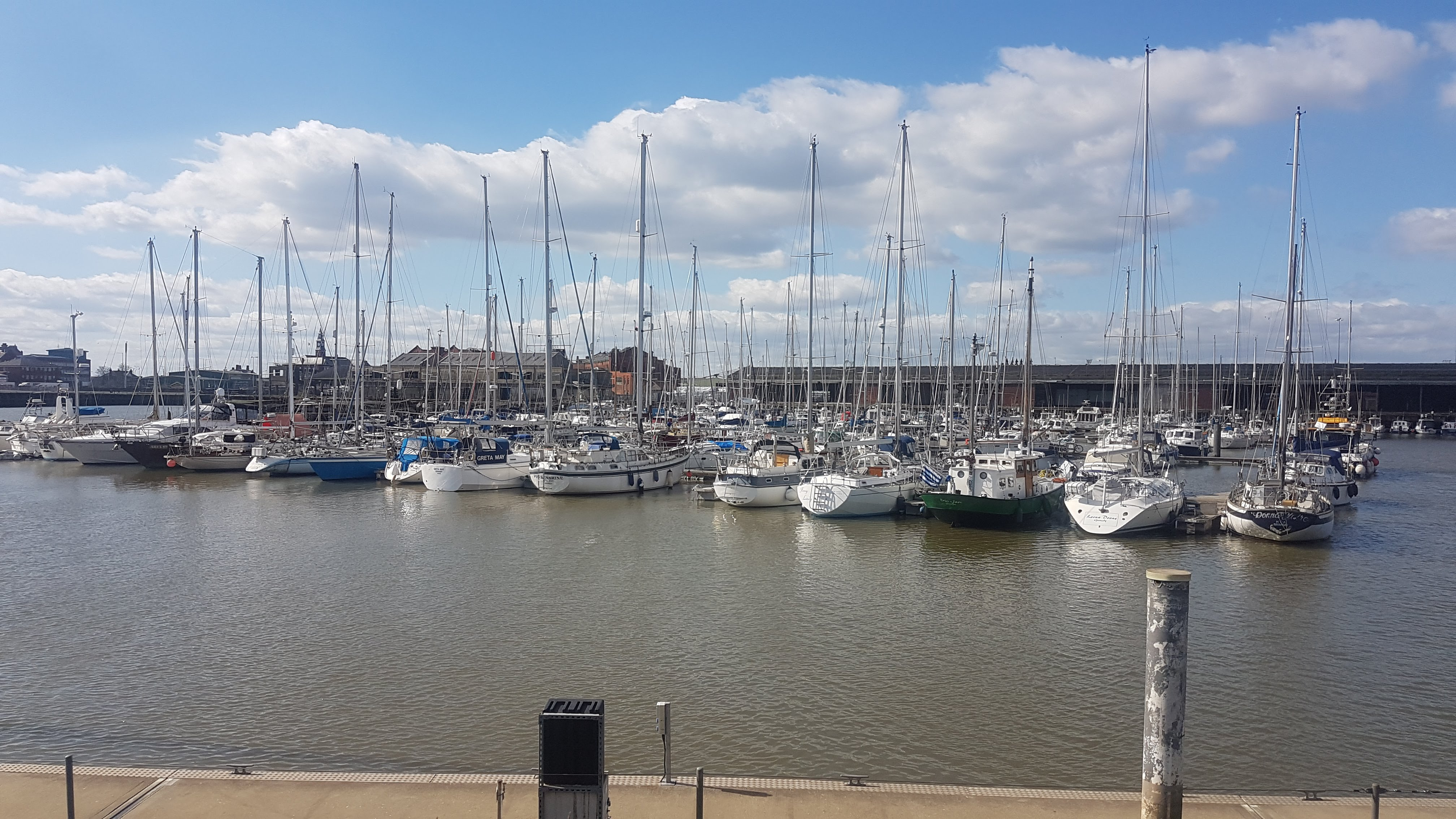
Humber Cruising Association Meridian Quay Marina

The club was first incorporated as a limited company in March 1994.

===== No.3 Dock (1934–) =====
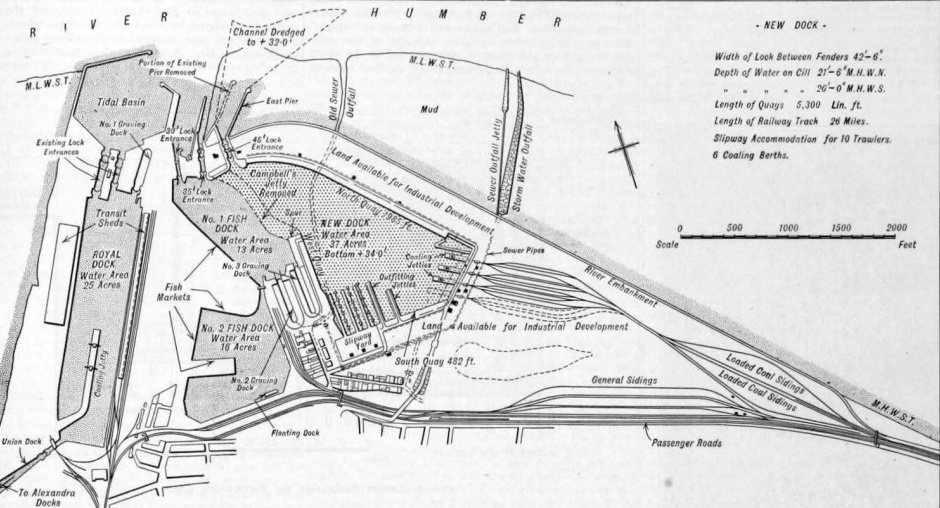
1934 diagram (The Engineer). No.3 Dock extension in the context of Nos. 1 & 2 Fish and Royal docks

Great Central Railway (Grimsby Fish Dock) Act 1912
- Act of Parliament
- Parliament of the United Kingdom
- Long title: An Act to authorise the Great Central Railway Company to enlarge their fish dock at Grimsby and for other purposes.
- Citation: 2 & 3 Geo. 5. c. clxv
- Territorial extent: United Kingdom

Dates
- Royal assent: 13 December 1912
- Commencement: 13 December 1912
- Repealed: 23 July 1982
Other legislation
| Relates to | Cumbria Act 1982 |

Status: Repealed

Text of statute as originally enacted

A need for an additional fish dock was seen from the early 20th century – the Great Central Railway (GCR) obtained an act, the Great Central Railway (Grimsby Fish Dock) Act 1912 (2 & 3 Geo. 5. c. clxv) for a fish dock in 1912; the dock was to extend No.1 dock to the east onto land reclaimed from the Humber. The scheme was abandoned due to the eruption of the First World War, after which the cost of the scheme has increased from the initial estimate of £0.5 million to £1.2 million; as a result, the scheme was not proceeded with. Later the GCR's successor the London and North Eastern Railway (LNER) proposed to the Grimsby Corporation that if the Corporation built a dock, the LNER would pay rent for use of the dock, until such time as the cost of dock and loans were repaid, at which point it would take over the dock – this scheme was agreed with and the corporation applied for a bill in Parliament. The Grimsby Corporation (Dock, etc.) Act 1929 (19 & 20 Geo. 5. c. lxxxiv) was passed in 1929. The dock was initially designed by chief dock engineer of the LNER J. A. Wickham, who died April 1930, and was succeeded by A. Tulip. The firm of John Wolfe Barry and partners were appointed engineers. Funding was aided by a governmental grant, intended to reduce unemployment.

The works included a reclamation of land to the north-east of the original fish dock, and a new river embankment of 6,800 feet (2,100 m) extending east-south-east into the district of Cleethorpes, enclosing substantial additional land in addition to the dock, including areas for railway sidings and up to 39 acres (16 ha) for industrial development. The north quay of No.1 dock (known as "Campbell's Jetty") was to be removed, making the No.1 and new fish docks contiguous with one another – the new dock water area was 37 acres (15 ha) giving a total water area of the No.1 and No.3 docks of 50 acres (20 ha).

Planned dock facilities included a 2,200 feet (670 m) north quay, rail fed coaling jetties on the east quay, and outfitting jetties and slipways on the south-east side. A third lock 45 feet (14 m) wide was to be constructed adjacent east and parallel with the existing locks of the fish dock; additionally the fish dock east entrance pier was to be removed, and a new pier constructed on the east side of the new lock. Other changes required included the rerouting of a sewer and its outfall channel further east. The estimated cost of the works was £1.418 million of which the corporation was enabled to raise £1.25 million, the remainder by the LNER, who agreed to a thirty-year lease on the dock. The company of Sir Lindsay Parkinson was contracted to carry out the work. A. E. Tarrant was the resident engineer.

Work on the dock began in November 1930. The diversion of sewer, river embankment, and steel sheet pile cofferdam for construction of the new lock were all complete by May 1932. The embankment was constructed primarily of tipped chalk, faced on the seaward side with concrete blocks. Dock construction required excavation of approximately 1,000,000 cubic yards (760,000 m^{3}) of material, primarily by dragline excavator, much of which was used to fill other areas of the newly enclosed land. Spoil and slag from Scunthorpe was also used as fill on the reclaimed land. The new 45 ft lock was 240 feet (73 m) long total with three gates. It was built on 12 inches (300 mm) square timber piles, supporting a square bottomed concrete lock pit. 'Blows', (underground springs) were encountered when excavating the lock's west wall foundations, undermining the work, and causing the newly laid concrete to crack. Work was delayed by remedial work to counter these springs, consisting of sunken centrifugal pumps used to draw of the water, temporarily reducing the local level of the water table. The lock was faced with granite. A pipe subway lined with cast iron segmental rings ran under part of the lock, carrying services (hydraulic, water, electricity). The initially installed gates were of oak, operated by hydraulically activated chains. The new east pier was 500 feet (150 m) long and constructed of timber, on the west side part of the old pier was removed and a new 175 feet (53 m) pier section added, meeting the old at a "V".

Construction of the dock's quays was delayed due to the weak ground conditions encountered, necessitation a partial redesign, and increasing cost. (Note: See earlier plans ie The Engineer & 5 June 1931, illus. p. 618.) The north and south quays were supported on 14 inches (360 mm) square reinforced piles spaced laterally and longitudinally at a distance of 12.5 feet (3.8 m). Larssen sheet piling was used at the rear of the quays, with a tipped chalk bank behind. The north quay showed movement before it was completed, and so the quay bank was tied back to anchorages inserted into the river embankment. Approximately 327,000 cubic feet (9,300 m^{3}) of concrete, 1,330 tons of steel reinforcement, and 1,724 piles were used in the north and south quays combined.

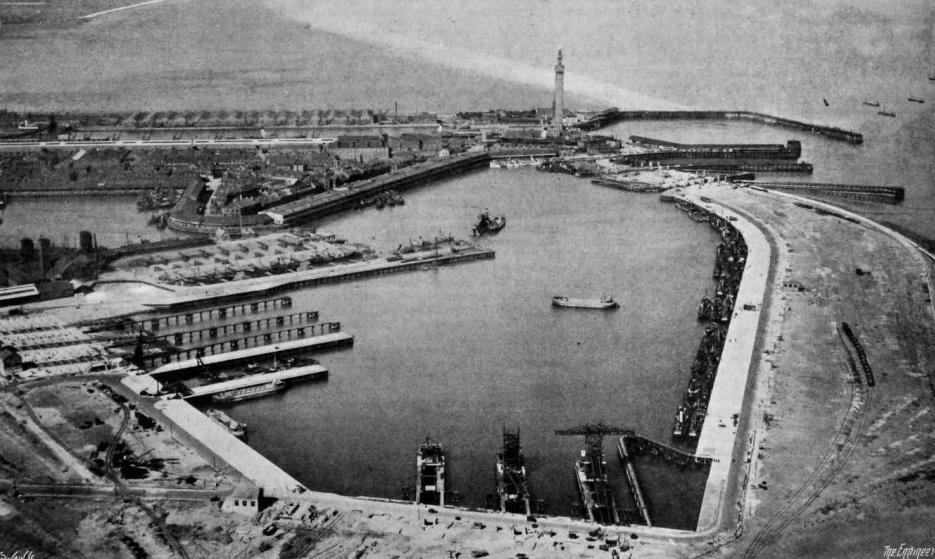
Fish docks No.1 and No.3 (under construction) c. 1934 from the east. Coaling stages, and slipways (left) in foreground

The east quay was built with a 1-in-3 slope retained by concrete sheet piling, and located three coaling stages supplied by the Mitchell Conveyor and Transporter Company, each extended into the dock on a pier. At the south-east side of the dock were slipways. Three adjacent slipways were constructed, with the machinery by Henderson and Nichol (Aberdeen); once lifted a ship would be moved sideways on a rail traverser onto an adjacent berth. The easternmost slipway had two berths, and was capable of lifting a maximum weight of 1,080 tons, and a maximum ship length of 160 feet (49 m). The other two slipways had lifting capacities of 600 tons, the centre slipway had two berths, the other three. Slipway and yard foundations were constructed from reinforced concrete, supported by concrete piles.

Main road access to the dock was by a reinforced concrete bridge from Humber Street (now Humber Bridge Street) crossing the main Grimsby to Cleethorpes railway line by five main spans. The works included the movement of existing rail sidings; plus construction of new general and coaling sidings, east of the dock. The dock was supplied with power from a 6,000 V supply from the LNER's power station at Immingham. Electricity substations were supplied by Metropolitan-Vickers, and lighting by the General Electric Company Ltd.

No.3 Fish Dock was opened 4 October 1934 by Sir Henry Betterton. (Note: 53.578991°N 0.062449°W, No.3 Fish Dock (1934))

In 2012 Centrica opened an operations and maintenance base on the north wall (fish dock), for use with the Lynn and Inner Dowsing Wind Farm and the Lincs Wind Farm. In 2013 as part of the arrangements to bring E.on to the dock, the dock's lock gates were modernised. In 2014 E.on opened an operations and maintenance base for its Humber Gateway Wind Farm.

In 2015 work to refurbish the 1935 boat repair slipways was initiated.

==== Grimsby Fish Market (1996–) ====
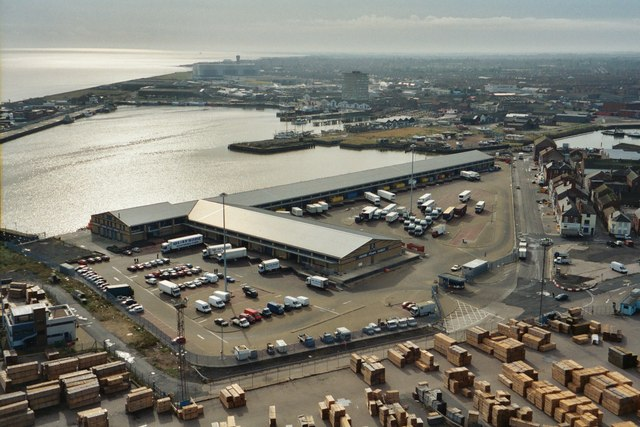
Fish Dock and fish market (2003)

In 1996 a new fish market (Grimsby Fish Market) was built on reclaimed land on a former fish dock (No.1). (Note: 53.581104°N 0.066676°W, Grimsby Fish Market (1996)) The majority of the fish sold at the market was not landed at Grimsby, but imported; approximately two thirds was supplied from Icelandic fishers, the remainder from other North Sea fishing nations (2006). The market handled 30,000 tons of fresh fish in 2006, approximately one third of the Grimsby total.

=== Union Dock (1879–) ===
The Union Dock was designed as a short canal from the end of the Royal Dock to inner of the Old Dock. (Note: 53.576671°N 0.077821°W, Union Dock (1879)) Logan and Hemingway were awarded the contract to build the dock, with a bid of £81,000. Work on the dock began 30 August 1873, and the final stone was laid 11 July 1879. The construction was hampered by poor ground conditions leading to the weight if the dockwalls displacing the adjacent ground. The total length of the dock, including lock was 870 feet (270 m), with a water area of 7,620 square yards (6,370 m^{2}); the lock was 304 by 45 feet (93 by 14 m) long by wide. Tannet, Walker and Company were awarded a £3,677 contract for a hydraulically operated swing bridge across the dock; the bridge was 76 feet (23 m) long carrying a single line of rail, plus walkways. Total cost of the dock was £258,700.

Union Dock was opened 22 July 1879 by the Prince and Princess of Wales (Edward VII and Alexandra of Denmark).

In the 1970s the canal was widened out, as part of the arrangements to allow large car carriers into Alexandra Dock.

=== Humber Commercial Railway and Dock (c. 1900) ===
In 1900 the Humber Commercial Railway and Dock sought powers from parliament to build a new dock west adjacent to the Royal Dock, and north of Alexandra Dock, on the banks of the Humber; this development was passed in 1901 as the Humber Commercial Railway and Dock Act 1901 (1 Edw. 7. c. ccii). The approach channel to the dock would have required extensive dredging, which may have had negative consequences on the adjacent docks; and as a consequence the Great Central Railway informed the promoters of the scheme it was to withdraw its support, unless the scheme was changed to one better positioned on the Humber, near Stallingborough, nearer to a deep water channel. In 1903 the company submitted amended plans to replace the previous consented dock at Grimsby with a new construction at Immingham, passed in as the Humber Commercial Railway and Dock Act 1904 (4 Edw. 7. c. lxxxv). This dock act led to the construction of the Immingham Dock.

=== Grimsby River Terminal (2013–) ===
In 2011 ABP received planning consent for a two berth terminal on the Humber outside the locked docks connected to the estate via a pier from the northwest corner of Royal Dock. The terminal was designed to increase the car importation ship capacity from 800 to 30,000 cars. Capital cost of the project was estimated at £25.1 million.

Construction was undertaken by Graham construction. The terminal consisted of an approach jetty approximately 820 feet (250 m) long; a floating concrete pontoon of 262 by 98 feet (80 by 30 m), 16 feet (5 m) deep weighing over 7,000 ton; a 230 feet (70 m) linkspan bridge connecting the pontoon to jetty; and a finger pier dividing the two berthing positions. The installation was constructed using 165 tubular steel piles between 30.0 and 55.9 inches (762 and 1,420 mm) diameter, up to 125 feet (38 m) long.

The terminal was completed and commissioned on 22 July 2013. The first vessel to dock at the terminal was the MV Ems Highway in July 2013. Official opening took place in September 2013.

=== Marine Control Centre (2015–) ===
In 2016 ABP, in its role as Statutory Harbour Authority for the Humber Estuary and for the ports of Immingham, Grimsby, Hull and Goole, began work on relocating its Vessel Traffic Services (VTS) centre at Spurn Point to a new Marine Control Centre in Grimsby, following deterioration of road access to Spurn. The new control centre was to be located at the northern edge of the docks, between Royal and Fish docks. (Note: 53.58320°N 0.06787°W, Marine Control Centre / VTS Watch Facility (2016))

== Port employment, trade and tonnage ==
After connection to the rail network, coupled with expansion of the port, and wider industrial development the tonnage handled through the port increased from around 160 kilotons in 1854, to nearly 3,800 kilotons in 1911. The opening and growth of Immingham Dock coupled with a wider decline in exports reduced tonnage to around 620 kilotons by 1938. After the Second World War the tonnage peaked at 1,500 kilotons in 1956, and declined to 640 kilotones by 1962.

Growth of the Grimsby fishing fleet caused the tonnage of fish landed to increase from 0.188 kilotons in 1855; to 30 kilotons in 1871, with 302 vessels operating from the port. Steam fishing began c. 1881, and this, coupled with diminishing North Sea fish stocks caused fishing to take place increasingly further afield – in 1911 landings from UK boats at the port were 190 kilotons. Demand was reduced in the interwar period, though recovered to 198 kilotons in 1951. Grimsby landed approximately 20% of UK fish in this period.

In the mid-1960s the fishing fleet employed directly several thousands of men, with over 250 fishing vessels, with many more people employed indirectly. £13 million worth of fish was landed at the port in 1965, out of a UK total of £40 million.

The problems of declining catches and increased fuel costs were exacerbated by the introduction of fishing zone limits (Exclusive economic zones) by several North Atlantic nations, as well fishing limits introduced with the membership of the European Economic Community. Landings dropped to 24 kilotons of fish by 1983. In 1976, prior to the collapse of the Humber fishing fleet the fishing industry employed 11,750 people in Grimsby, including land based work, representing 17% of employment. Grimsby's fishing industry was less affected than the Port of Hull due to a more diversified fishing fleet, in comparison to the Hull fleet's reliance on deep water fishing. Though fish continued to be imported into Grimsby for processing, much of it began to arrive by road from other ports, and not via the docks. Fish processing activities remained an important employment sector in the town after the collapse of the sea-based fishing industry – with over 6,000 persons employed in 1984, representing a nationally significant percentage of all fish processing based employment in the UK in the 1980s, with extensive cold storage facilities on and off the dock estates.

In the 1980s major freight imports included Volkswagen cars, timber from the Scandinavia and Russia, Danish food produce; exports included manufactured goods, and steel slab from Scunthorpe.

== Other structures ==
=== Historic ===
Many buildings were constructed on and around the dock estate servicing related industries.

The streets west of the fish dock was one such area, with a concentration of fish processing related activities and businesses – several buildings in the area are now listed due to their relationship to the fishing industry; these include: a fish processing and smoking factory, brick, late 19th century, on Fish Dock Road; two fish smoking factories on Henderson Street: one of yellow brick with red brick dressing, late 19th century; the other in red brick with concrete tile roof, late 19th and early 20th century; two fish processing and smoking factories on Sidebottom Street : one dating to around 1900 in red brick (with rendering) with 20th century alterations; the other in yellow brick (rendered) dating to the early 20th century; a fish processing and smoking factory on Riby Street, in yellow and red brick, with render, dating to the early 20th century; and a fish processing and smoking factory on Maclure Street, dating from the interbellum, converted from late 19th/early 20th century smithy building.

The fishing industry required ice to preserve the caught fish, and Grimsby had a number of ice factories, one of which, also on the dock estate west of the fish dock, now known as the Grimsby Ice Factory, is now a listed building. The building dates to the beginning of the 20th century, is of red brick, and was formerly the factory of the Grimsby Ice Company Limited.

On the east side of Royal Dock, the former flour mill, "Victoria Mills", is also listed. The building by architect Alfred Gelder was built in a Flemish style using red brick with blue brick and terracotta dressings, it dates to builds in 1889 and 1905. Part of the mill has been converted into flat accommodation, whilst, as of 2015, the other part is unoccupied and derelict.

The directly dock related Dock Offices and Customs House are also listed, located near the junction of the Royal and Union docks, close to Cleethorpes Road: The Dock Offices were built in 1885 by Mills and Murgatroyd for the Grimsby Dock Company, an H plan building of three storeys, in brick with stone and terracotta dressing; the Customs House dates to 1874, two storeys with five bays, in red brick, with stone and black brick dressings. To the front of the Dock Office is a bronze statue of Albert, Prince Consort commissioned to William Theed in celebration of the Royal visit to the opening of the Union Dock in 1879.

The sites of the Royal Dock cofferdam, and of the Royal Dock's graving dock are also now listed as historic monuments by Historic England.

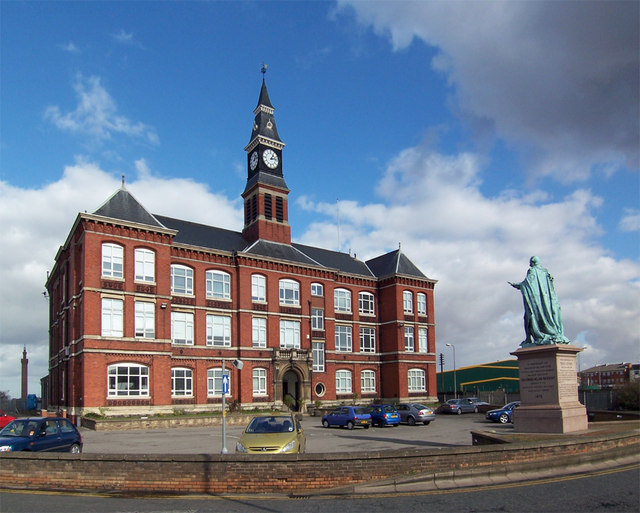
Dock Offices, 1885; statue of Albert, Prince Consort, 1879, to front (2007)

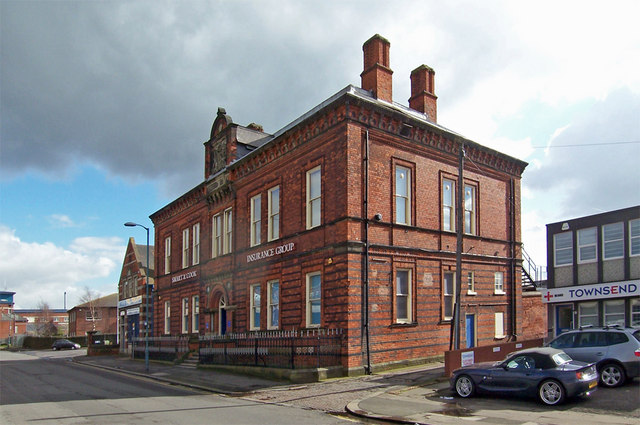
The Old Customs House, 1874 (2007)

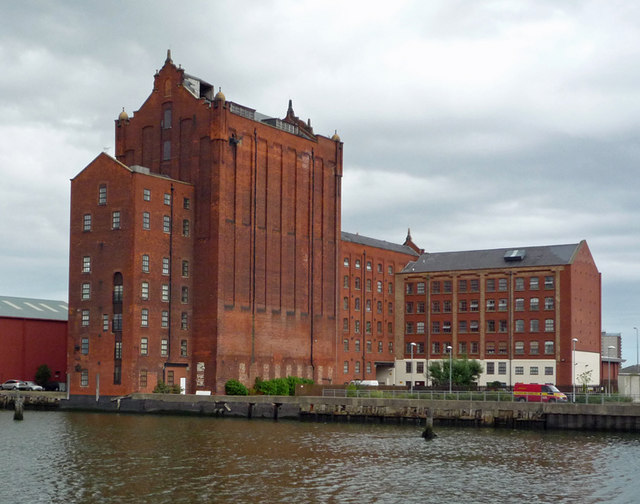
Victoria Mills (2008)

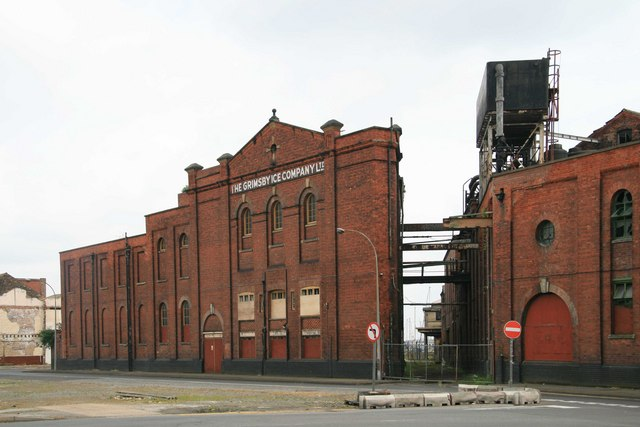
Grimsby ice factory (2008)

=== Modern ===
In 2013 a two-year project of construction of a 2.2-mile (3.5 km) flood wall around the docks began, with an estimated cost of around £20 million.

== See also ==
- Cod War
- Industry of the South Humber Bank

== Acts ==
- 36 Geo. 3. c. 98 (1796), An Act for Widening, Deepening, Enlarging, Altering, and Improving the Haven and Town and Port of Great Grimsby, in the County of Lincoln; Incorporation of the Grimsby Haven company
- 39 Geo. 3. c. lxx (1799), An Act for enabling the Grimsby Haven Company to finish and complete the navigation of the said haven, and for amending an Act, passed in the thirty-sixth year of the reign of His present Majesty, for widening, deepening, enlarging, altering, and improving the haven of the town and port of Great Grimsby, in the county of Lincoln
- 6 Geo. 4. c. cxiv (1825), An Act for amending and rendering more effectual two Acts of the thirty-sixth and thirty-ninth years of His late Majesty, for improving the haven of Great Grimsby, in the county of Lincoln
- 8 & 9 Vict. c. ccii (1845), Grimsby Docks Act; Grimsby Haven company dissolved and undertaking transferred to Grimsby Dock company, construction of further docks.
- 9 & 10 Vict. c. cclxviii (1846), Manchester, Sheffield and Lincolnshire Railway Act, amalgamation of several railway companies and the Grimsby Dock company into the new Manchester, Sheffield and Lincolnshire Railway.
- 32 & 33 Vict. c. x (1869), Grimsby Improvement Act; Construction on West Marshes, a bridge over the Old Dock, etc.
- 36 & 37 Vict. c. lxxvii (1873), Manchester, Sheffield and Lincolnshire Railway Act; Railway No.3 in the London Gazette announcement refers to the Great Coates branch.
- 1 Edw. 7. c. ccii (1901), Humber Commercial Railway and Dock Act; Act for a new dock in Grimsby.
  - amended by 4 Edw. 7. c. 85 (1904), Humber Commercial Railway and Dock Act, a proposed dock to be sited instead at a site in Immingham; further act in 1908 (8 Edw. 7. c. 49); amended 1909 by the Great Central Railway (Various Powers) Act 1909 (9 Edw. 7. c. 85); and Humber Commercial Railway and Dock Act 1913 (3 & 4 Geo. 5. c. 20).
- 2 & 3 Geo. 5. c. 165 (1912), Great Central Railway (Grimsby Fish Dock) Act
- 19 & 20 Geo. 5. c. 84 (1929), Grimsby Corporation (Dock, etc.) Act; enabling the construction of (No.3) Fish dock.
