= Grimsby station =

Grimsby station may refer to:

- Grimsby station (Via Rail), a long-distance rail station in Grimsby, Ontario, Canada
- Grimsby GO Station, a proposed commuter rail station in Grimsby, Ontario, Canada

== See also ==
- Grimsby Town railway station, in Grimsby, England
- Grimsby Docks railway station, in Grimsby, England
- Grimsby Pier railway station, in Grimsby, England closed 1939
- Grimsby Pyewipe Road railway station, in Grimsby, England closed 1912
