= Blundell Park =

Football ground in North East Lincolnshire, England

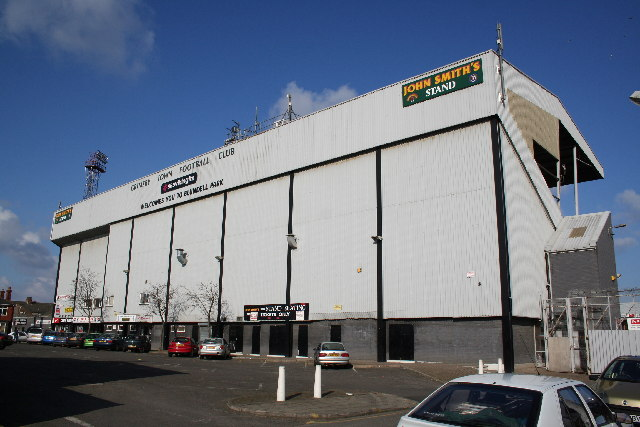
- The Ramsdens Home Interiors Stand (then named The John Smith's Stand) in 2003.
- Interactive map of Blundell Park
- Location: Blundell Park; Cleethorpes; North East Lincolnshire; DN35 7PY
- Coordinates: 53°34′12″N 0°2′47″W
- Owner: Grimsby Town F.C.
- Operator: Grimsby Town F.C.
- Capacity: 9,546
- Surface: Grass
- Scoreboard: Yes
- Record attendance: 31,651 (vs Wolverhampton Wanderers, 20 February 1937)
- Field size: 101.5 by 68.5 metres (111.0 by 74.9 yd)
- Public transit: New Clee (0.7 mi) Cleethorpes (1.1 mi); Grimsby Docks (1.3 mi) Grimsby Town (2.3 mi)

Construction
- Groundbreaking: 1897
- Built: 1899
- Opened: 2 September 1899
- Renovated: 1925, 1939, 1961, 1982, 1995

Tenant
- Grimsby Town (1899–present)

Blundell Park is a football ground in Cleethorpes, North East Lincolnshire, England and home to Grimsby Town Football Club. The stadium was built in 1899, but only one of the original stands remains. The current capacity of the ground is 9,052, after being made all-seater in summer 1995, reducing the number from around 27,000. Several relegations in previous years meant the expansion seating was also taken away; that reduced the capacity further from around 12,000 to what it is now.

The stadium is Grimsby Town's fourth ground, having previously played at Clee Park, Lovett Street and Abbey Park in the club's first twenty years of existence. The record attendance at Blundell Park was 31,651 in an FA Cup tie against Wolverhampton Wanderers on 20 February 1937. The two clubs also hold the record attendance at Manchester United's Old Trafford stadium when 76,962 people saw the two sides meet again in the 1939 FA Cup semi-final.

== History ==
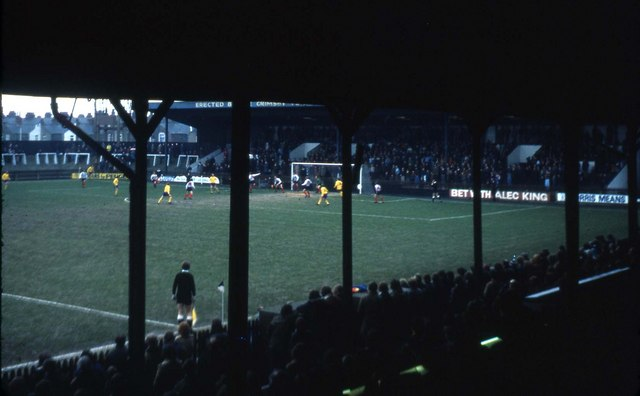
A Grimsby Town game in 1977. View from the Main Stand towards The Pontoon

Grimsby Town Football Club moved into their new Blundell Park stadium in the summer of 1899, having relocated from Abbey Park, and bringing with them all the fixtures and fittings, as well as the Abbey Park and the Hazel Grove stands. Blundell Park is named after Peter Blundell whose money enabled Sidney Sussex College, Cambridge to buy the land in 1616. The opening match was a Football League Second Division fixture against Luton Town on 2 September 1899, with 4,000 spectators seeing the teams draw 3–3. In 1901 a new Main Stand was built on the northern side of the ground.

In 1925 the Abbey Park Stand was demolished and in its place was built the Barrett's Stand. In 1937 the club's record attendance of 31,651 was recorded when the club met Wolverhampton Wanderers in an FA Cup tie on 20 February 1937. In 1939 around the time of the break-out of the Second World War the Hazel Grove Stand, the final remaining stand from the previous ground was demolished and was replaced by the Osmond Stand.

In 1953 the club introduced its first floodlights to the ground and with that enabling Grimsby Town to play night-time fixtures. Tall floodlights were purchased second hand from Wolverhampton Wanderers in 1958 and installed in 1960 at a cost of £9,000 which was raised by the supporters club, they have illuminated matches ever since when required.

In 1961, the 63-year-old Pontoon Stand was demolished and replaced with a new stand of the same name. In 1980 the ground was renovated again, the Main Stand the ground's only original stand was made an all-seater, and the Barrett's stand which was built in 1925 was demolished and replaced the two tier Findus stand, which now became the ground's largest stand. Following the Taylor Report which documented the Hillsborough disaster, Blundell Park was made an all seater stadium in 1995. The club in 1995 also introduced temporary seating in the partings between the Pontoon and Main Stands and the Osmond and Findus stands. The club's largest attendance since being made an all seater stadium was 9,528 on 3 March 1999 against Sunderland in a Football League Division One tie. Following Grimsby Town's relegation from the second tier of English football to the fourth between in 2003 and 2004, the club removed the expansion seating, which would only have made returns in high-profile cup fixtures.

Grimsby Town received a £19,000 grant in April 2015 from The Football Stadia Improvement Fund (FSIF) – the largest funder of non-league football in the country, which enabled the club to carry out repairs and maintenance to the floodlights at Blundell Park.

The stadium celebrated its 125th anniversary in September 2024 with a range of community and matchday activities around the ground and on social media.

== The ground as it stands ==
=== Pontoon Stand ===
In 1899, Blundell Park was opened with the original Pontoon Stand constructed alongside the Main Stand, but this stand was eventually demolished in 1961 and was replaced by the current Pontoon Stand which was built by funds raised by the club's supporters. The stand is situated behind the goal to the right of the tunnel and was converted to an all-seater facility in 1995 in response to the Taylor Report following the Hillsborough disaster of 1989 and the seats were laid out in black and white stripes to reflect the club's colours.

The Pontoon mainly houses the more vocal supporters of the club, and often houses a drummer; however in the mid-1980s the stand became the away stand with the Osmond Stand reserved for home fans, the thought being that the Pontoon's more open design would make the Grimsby Town supporters' presence more noticeable in the remainder of the stadium. This was extremely unpopular with club supporters and reversed.

The club constructed a new roof on the Pontoon Stand for the start of the 2023–24 season.

In May 2026, Technica were announced as the sponsor of the stand in a three-year partnership which meant the stand would be known as 'The Technica Pontoon'.

=== Findus Stand ===
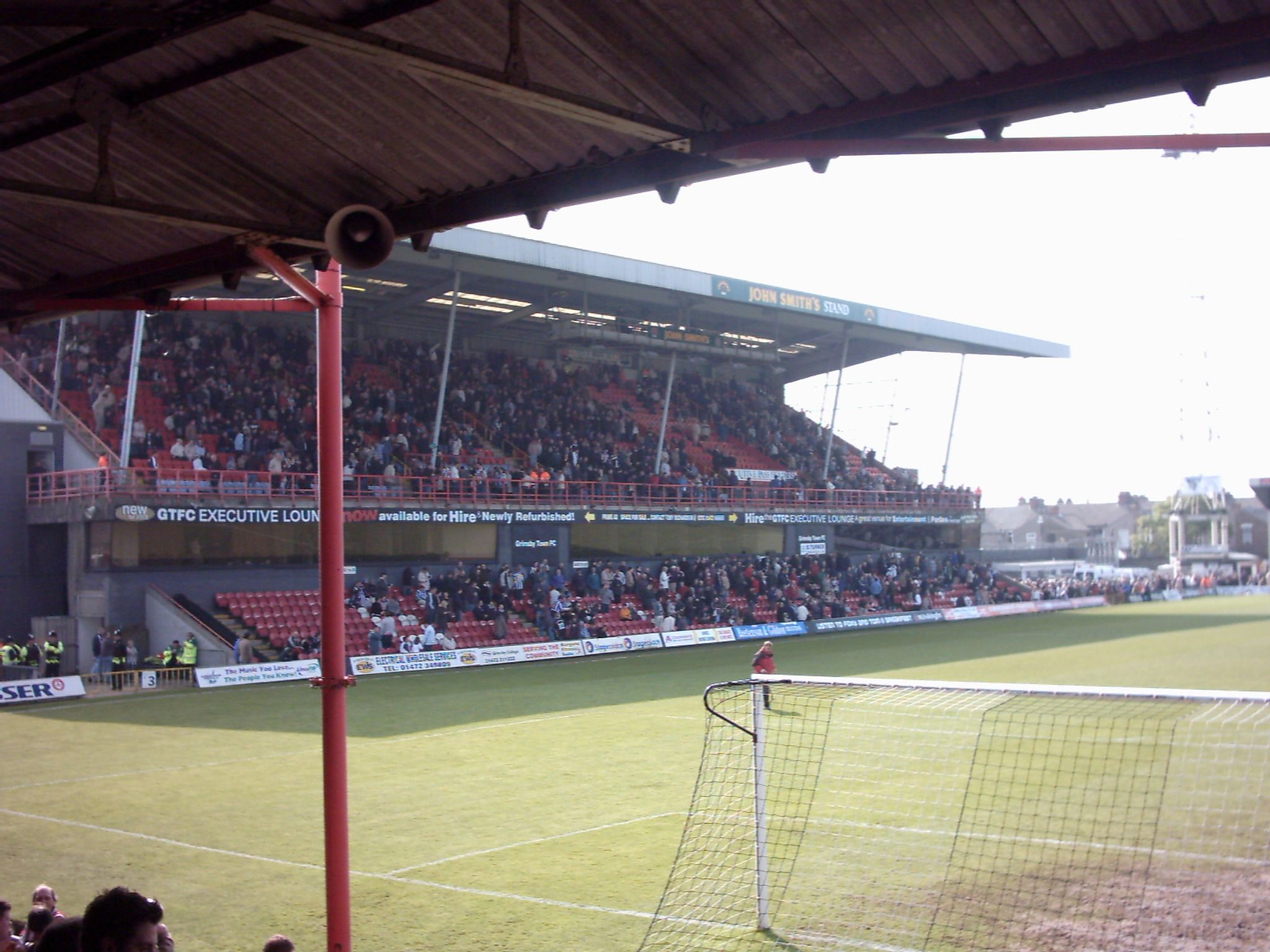
Findus Stand

The Findus Stand is the third to be built on the opposite side of the ground to the tunnel and changing rooms. Originally the club had moved the Abbey Park Stand from their previous ground the Abbey Park Stadium, this stand was eventually demolished in 1925 and was replaced by the Barrett's Stand. The Barrett's itself was eventually demolished in 1980 and was replaced with a two tier stand paid for by the fish processing firm Findus. The stand therefore was named the "Findus Stand".

The stand was opened in 1982 and is the largest inside the stadium with the upper tier offering a scenic view of the Humber Estuary, Spurn Point and the North Sea, from this point you can clearly view the shipping going down the estuary. The lower tier's front rows are uncovered and between the two tiers are a row of corporate boxes. Housed within the stand is the boardroom, ticket office, club shop, bars and the "McMenemy's" function suite and restaurant which is named after former manager Lawrie McMenemy.

In 1990s Findus ceased production in the town, so the stand went through several other sponsored names. Firstly the stand was renamed the Stones Bitter stand before later becoming the John Smiths stand in 1997 and then the Carlsberg stand in 2004. The stand was also sponsored by Viking FM for a short time before the Findus name returned in 2009 and the stand then reverted to its original name.

For the 2016–17 season, a new sponsorship deal with the club's long serving kit sponsor Young's Seafood was announced with the tiers being renamed to the Upper Young's and Lower Young's stands. Grimsby parted ways with Young's in 2023, with the stand continuing without any sponsorship.

Ahead of the 2025–26 season, local business Ramden's Home Interiors were named as the new sponsor of both tiers of the stand.on a multi-year deal.

=== Main Stand ===
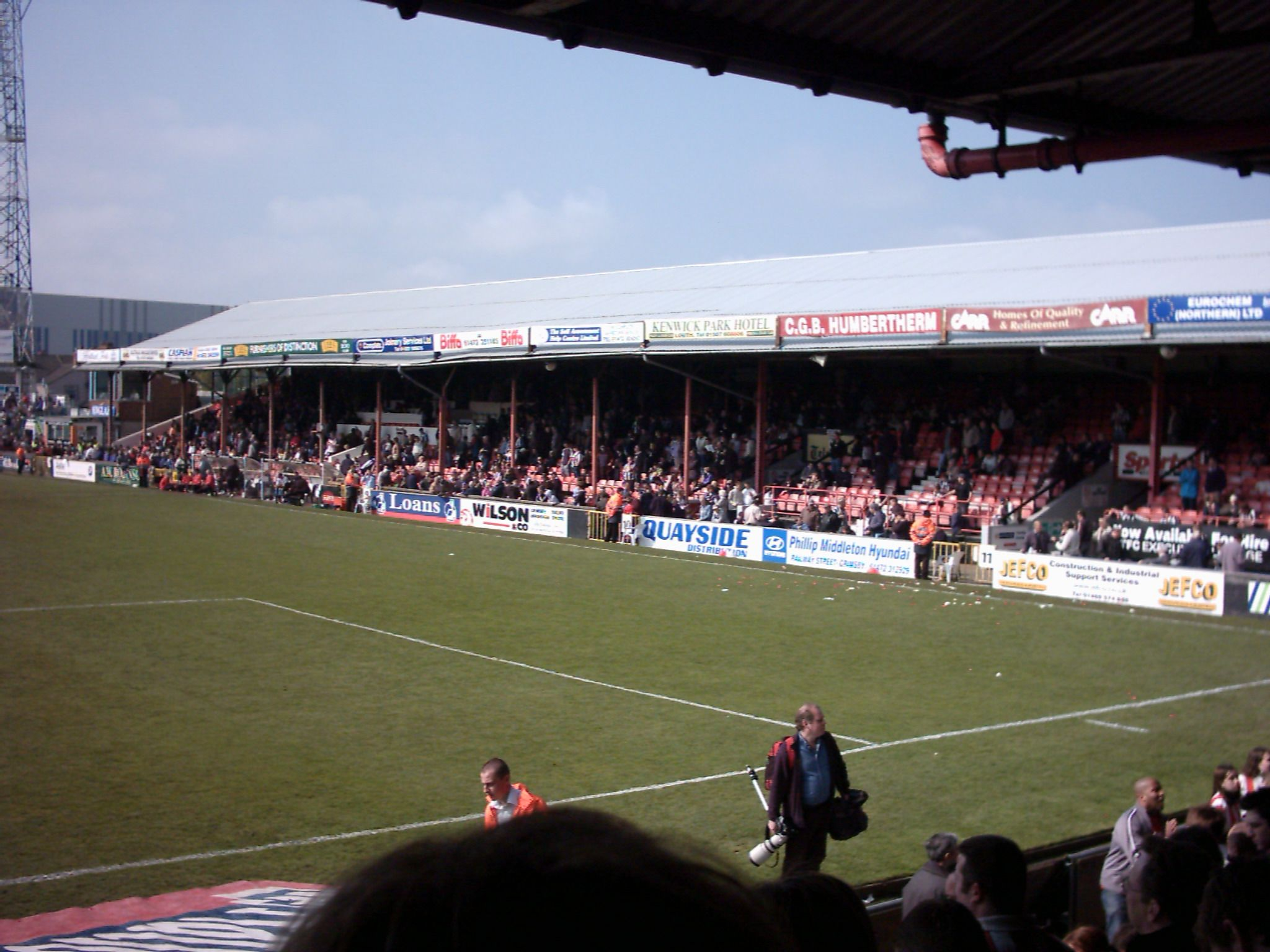
Main Stand

Opposite the Young's stand, on the north side of the ground, is the Main Stand which dates from 1901 and is often claimed to be the oldest stand in the Football League until the club's relegation to Non-league football in 2010. Only the central part of the stand dates from 1901, the rest having been modified in some guise or other. This stand houses the changing rooms and disabled supporters' areas. The players' tunnel runs from the centre of this stand onto the pitch between the two dugouts. The back rows of the stand have restricted views of the pitch due to the height of the roof and the supports.

Ahead of the 2025–26 season, locally based company Technical Absorbents were named as the new sponsor of the stand.on a multi-year deal and would be known as 'The Technical Absorbents Stand'.

=== Osmond Stand ===
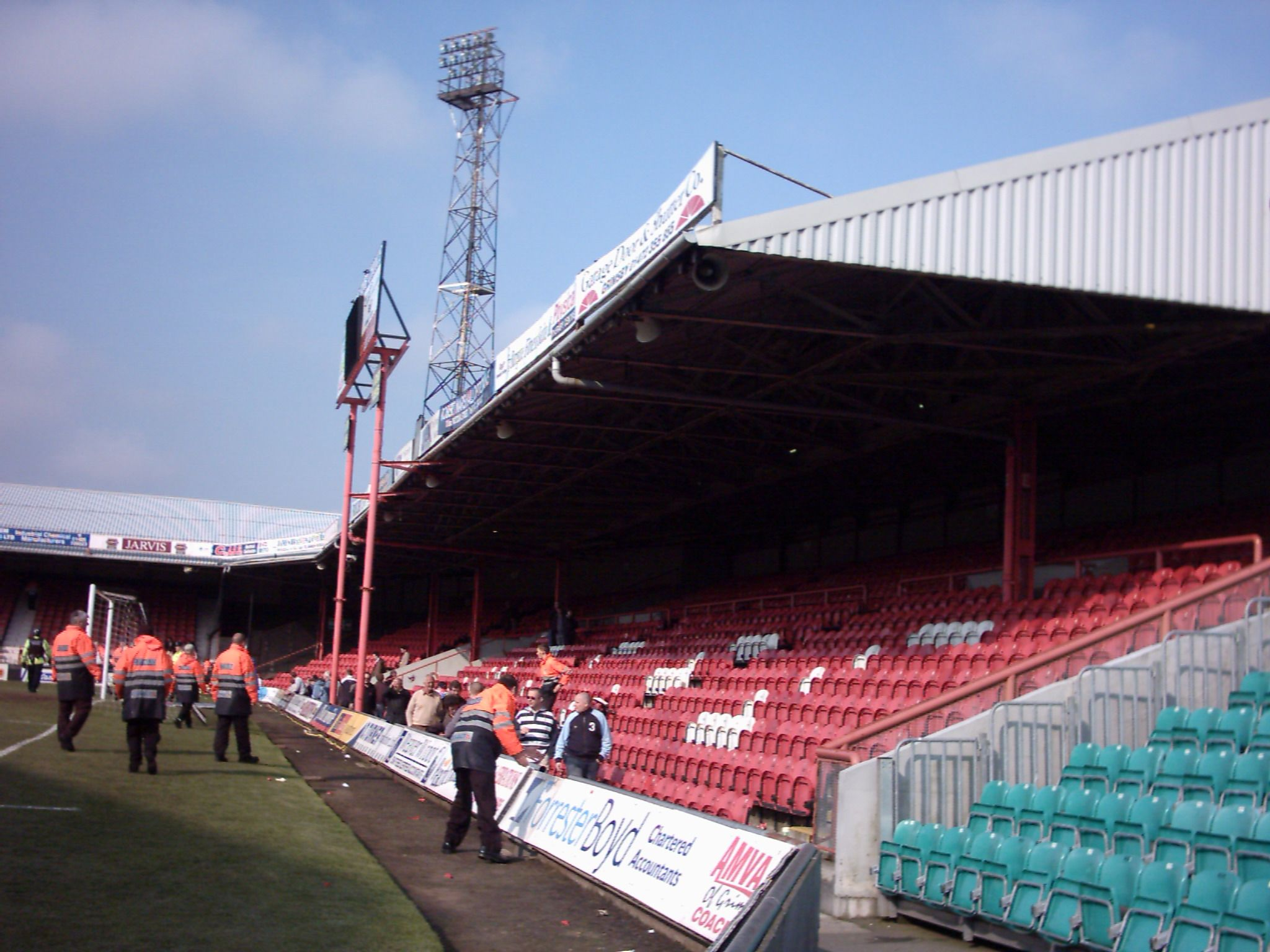
Osmond Stand (Away End)

To the left of the Main Stand, is the Osmond Stand. This replaced the Hazel Grove Stand which was moved from the club's previous Abbey Park Stadium home. The Osmond was built in 1939 when the Hazel Grove was demolished shortly before the start of the Second World War. The Osmond stand is also a two tier stand, but unlike the Young's Stand, the Osmond only has steps separating the two parts. The stand houses the away supporters, with the stand being used as an over flow for home fans occasionally when the club are playing a visiting team with a low number of travelling fans, with the stand being halved. The stand holds around 2,000 seats, 1,000 or so of those seats have a restricted view due to the roof supports and height of the roof.

The stand did briefly hold home supporters in the mid-1980s when the club decided the move the away supporters to the Pontoon Stand, but this proved to be unpopular with Grimsby supporters and so the decision was reversed. The corner between the Main Stand and the Osmond Stand is the only enclosed corner in the whole ground, the corner is shut off and this section is the only standing part of the stadium however with it being shut off from the fans the ground is still classed as an all seated stadium.

On 30 October 2026, a deal with energy company, Ørsted, was announced on a two-year initial deal, resulting in the stand being named 'The Ørsted Stand'.

=== The Daphne Farquharson Wheelchair Stand ===
Located between the Findus Stand and the Osmond Stand is the Daphne Farquharson Wheelchair Stand. The stand which provides viewing platforms for wheelchair users and disabled supporters was officially unveiled on 1 October 2026 but had previously been used in a trial game earlier on in the season. It was funded through a fundraising campaign and developed through a collaboration with the club, the Mariners Trust and the club's Disabled Supporters Association. The stand is named after Daphne Farquarson, who founded the Grimsby Town Disabled Supporters Travel Club alongside her late husband, Don Farquarson.

=== Additional seating ===
When Blundell Park became an all seated stadium in 1995, the overall capacity of the ground decreased accordingly. The club erected temporary seating in the north-west and south-east corners, colloquially known as "the green seats". These consisted of four blocks of makeshift scaffold seating approximately 10 rows back. The temporary seating were intended to provide additional capacity when needed, but were in regular use on a weekly basis while the club enjoyed a lengthy spell playing in the English Championship.

Relegation from the Championship led to reduced match attendance and temporary seating became largely redundant. In special cup fixtures, for instance the 2005 League Cup games with Tottenham Hotspur and Newcastle United the temporary seating is reinstalled for one-off use.

Due to the changes in seating, the ground's overall capacity dropped from just under 12,000 while in the Championship to just under 10,000 in League Two.

=== Layout ===
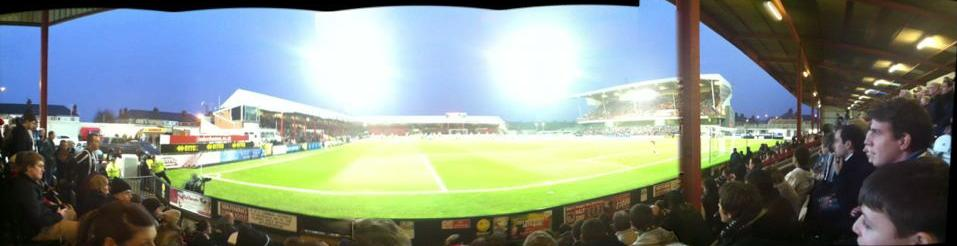

A view for the Pontoon Stand looking at the Main Stand on the left, Osmond Stand Middle and Findus Stand right (taken on New Year's Day 2012).

== International games ==
Over the years Blundell Park has been host to a number of international matches. In 2001 it hosted France U18 against Finland U18, and over the years has also hosted England U17, England U18 and England women's national under-19 football team games.

== Future ==
As parts of Blundell Park are antiquated, the cost of maintaining the stadium, particularly the wooden sections, is expensive. Compared to many modern football grounds, there is a severe shortage of corporate facilities and amenities for visiting supporters. Blundell Park is consistently rated one of the worst football grounds to visit as an away supporter. Bars and food outlets within the stadium are usually crowded and unable to realise their potential income. Blundell Park is rarely used for anything other than football, whereas many clubs with more modern stadia are able to let out the ground for concerts, corporate events and other sports such as rugby. Further complications arise from the location of the stadium among terraced houses and next to the bank of the River Humber (separated by a railway line) which makes redeveloping Blundell Park to accommodate the 20,000 supporters required for promotion to the Premier League prohibitively expensive. Parking is largely limited to the streets of terraced houses surrounding the stadium. There is no secure parking at Blundell Park and no additional provision for public transport such as park and ride. Blundell Park is also the lowest football stadium in the United Kingdom, at a height of only 2 feet above sea-level.

=== Conoco Stadium, Great Coates ===
Since the mid-1990s the club has been pursuing a move to a new stadium elsewhere in the area. In the late 1990s the club submitted a planning application for a new stadium on the western outskirts of Grimsby at Great Coates, adjacent to the A180 dual carriageway. The provisionally titled Conoco Stadium was to be funded by a partnership with a major retailer and would be built with a capacity of 14,000 that could be expanded up to 21,000 (to meet Premier League requirements) in a matter of weeks by building the entire structure of the stadium but not installing any facilities or seats in the four corners of the stadium until they were required. Following Grimsby's promotion to the second tier of English football in 1991 – and remaining there for all but one of the next 12 seasons – the Taylor Report required that all clubs in the top two divisions should have an all-seater stadium by August 1994, with newly promoted teams being allowed three seasons to meet the requirements. However, Grimsby have not played in the second tier of English football since 2003 and from 2010 to 2016 were in the National League (formerly the Conference Premier).

The new stadium would have included facilities to match the best Premier League clubs including a substantial increase in match-day hospitality areas, more corporate boxes of a higher standard, more cafe and bar areas including for away supporters, more toilets, larger and more versatile player dressing rooms, wider seats with more legroom, a hard-wearing hybrid pitch capable of withstanding multiple rugby and football matches being played on it every week and facilities that could be used throughout the year for corporate events.

The aim was to open the new stadium for the start of the 2001/2002 season. After considerable opposition to the plans from local residents delayed the project, the new stadium received planning permission from North East Lincolnshire Council in November 2000. The Government Office for Yorkshire and the Humber approved the plan in February 2002, Conoco agreed naming rights to the stadium in April 2002 and the revised opening date was set for the start of the 2003/2004 season. At the end of 2002 retailers Woolworths and B&Q pulled out of the scheme and opening was set back again to the 2005/2006 season. After planning permission was refused in 2003 due to issues with the release of the land the club resubmitted a planning application in 2006 along the same lines as the earlier proposal that was awarded permission by the council in 2007. Due to the economic crisis of 2008 and struggling performances on the pitch the stadium's planning permission expired in 2010 and the Great Coates proposal was no longer considered viable.

=== Peaks Parkway ===
After committing to seeking a new site for a new stadium in 2011 the club actively pursued a range of potential stadium sites in an around Grimsby. After a long feasibility study the momentum was clearly behind a site off Peaks Parkway two miles South of Grimsby. The club submitted a planning application for a less ambitious 14,000 capacity stadium along with an adjoining retail development in November 2016. Opponents to the Peaks Parkway scheme argued that the use of a greenfield site over various brownfield alternatives and the proximity of the stadium to a cemetery made it unsuitable and the council took the site off the table in October 2018.

=== Freeman Street / East Marsh / Grimsby Fish Dock ===
In October 2018 the council indicated a preference for Freeman Street and the East Marsh to be used as a new location for a new stadium as part of a major regeneration project of this part of the town. Advantages of this site include extensive regeneration of the area and the use of a brownfield site but disadvantages include parking and transport as the new stadium would be within the town itself.

Talk of using the fish docks as a site for a new stadium has increased since July 2019. Advantages of this site are the use of the underused but iconic docks which could be directly incorporated into the design and ample scope for parking and transport links. Disadvantages include the potential cost of filling in the docks and land decontamination. The 2019 General Election produced a Conservative victory in the Great Grimsby Constituency and this may have a significant effect on the stadium plans. As government policy is to support the creation of Free Ports there is an opportunity for the town to attract more inward investment and for the ports to grow. This would make the fish docks site less desirable as it could limit the regeneration of the port and the revitalisation of the fishing industry. Nevertheless, a consortium looking to take ownership of the club has continued to pursue the concept of a stadium on the fish dock site.

At the end of December 2019 the leader of the council stated that regeneration of the Freeman Street area with a new stadium on it was "top of his wish list for 2020", however in March 2020 all football was suspended as a result of the COVID-19 pandemic and the chairman of the club declared that the new stadium was now "bottom on our list of priorities".

In March 2023 the leader of the council stated that the football club was no longer pursuing the Freeman Street area as the site of a new stadium and that the club was prioritising making improvements to Blundell Park.

As of April 2024 the club are continuing a slow redevelopment of Blundell Park with half the main stand posts removed and replaced by a steel beam both enhancing view and experience . An additional 100 seats will also be added to the Pontoon Stand .

== Records ==
The highest ever attendance at the ground was 31,651 for an FA Cup 5th Round match on 20 February 1937 against Wolverhampton Wanderers. Since the ground was converted to all seating for the start of the 1995–96 season after the Taylor Report, the highest attendance was 9,528 for a Football League Division One (Second Tier) match against Sunderland on 13 March 1999.
