= New Clee =

Suburb of Grimsby, Lincolnshire, England

Coordinates: 53°34′N 0°3.61′W

New Clee is a suburb and an ecclesiastical parish of Grimsby in North East Lincolnshire, England.

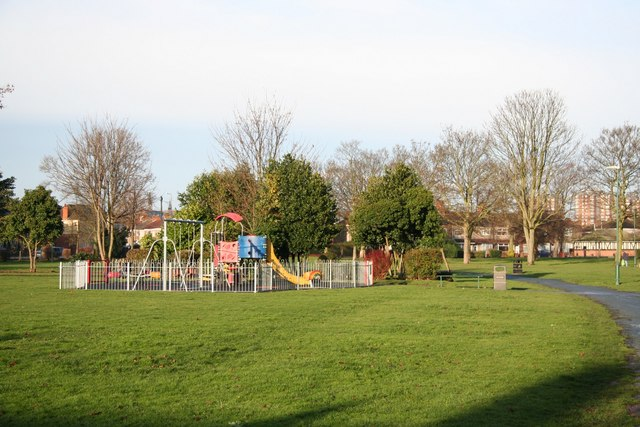
Grant Thorold park

The ecclesiastical parish is New Clee St John & St Stephen, based on the eponymous parish church, includes suburban streets, the station, part of the docks, and Grant Thorold Park which was a 1904 gift to Grimsby. The parish is part of the Deanery of Grimsby & Cleethorpes. The 2013 incumbent is the Revd Kay Jones.

The original Saxon church of St. John the Evangelist was rebuilt in 1879, designed by J. Fowler, the Louth architect. It was demolished when the Cleethorpes road was widened. The church, with both its dedications, now meets at the Shalom Centre in Rutland Street.

According to the Church Urban Fund this is one of the most deprived areas in the country.

Blundell Park football ground is in the suburb, but outside the ecclesiastical parish.

The suburb is served by New Clee railway station.
