= Corporation Bridge =

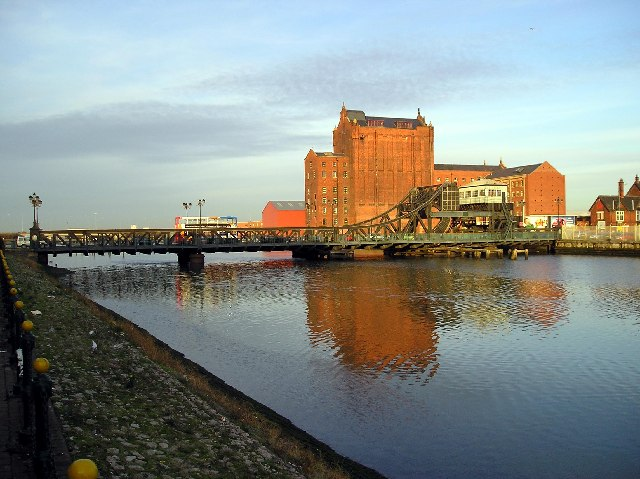
- Coordinates: 53.57075°N 0.08276°W
- Carries: Road, Walkway
- Crosses: Alexandra Dock, Grimsby
- Locale: Grimsby, North East Lincolnshire
- Maintained by: North East Lincolnshire Council

Characteristics
- Design: Single-leaf Scherzer rolling lift bascule bridge
- Total length: 490 feet (150 m)
- Width: 39 feet (12 m)

History
- Opened: Original bridge 1872; Current bridge 1925

Statistics

Listed Building – Grade II
- Official name: Corporation Bridge
- Designated: 30 June 1999 (25 years ago)
- Reference no.: 1379432

The Corporation Bridge is a Scherzer rolling lift bascule bridge over the Old Dock (Alexandra Dock) in Grimsby, North East Lincolnshire, England. Built in 1925, it replaced an earlier swing bridge dating to 1872.

== 1872 bridge ==
The Grimsby Improvement Act 1869 (32 & 33 Vict. c. x) allowed the land west of the old dock to be developed, and a bridge built across the dock.

The bridge was constructed by Head Wrightson and the Teesdale Ironworks to the design of Charles Sacre. Situated between the two sets of spans was a horizontally turning swing bridge of 91.25 feet (27.81 m) of asymmetric hogback plate girder design with a clear space when open of 45 feet (14 m).

The bridge opened in 1872

== 1925 bridge ==
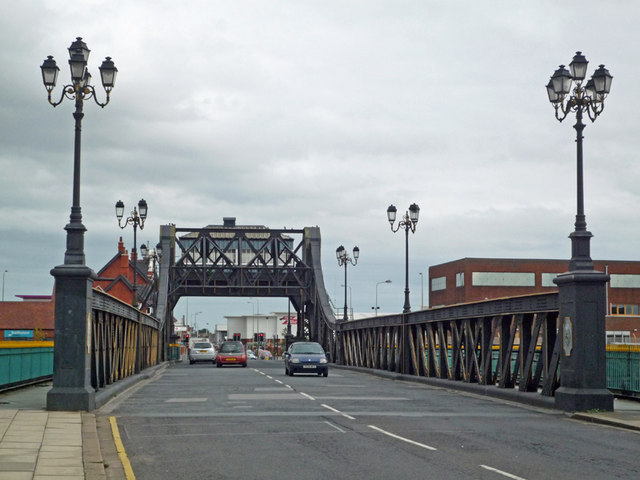
View from street (2008)

The bridge spans Alexandra Dock near Victoria Mills, Victoria Street and replaced a swing bridge.

The bridge is an electrically powered road bridge built on the Scherzer rolling lift bridge principle road bridge, built in 1925 to the design of Alfred C. Gardner, docks engineer of the London and North Eastern Railway. The contractors were Sir William Arrol & Co. It was formally opened by the Prince of Wales (Edward VIII), commemorated on a plaque on the bridge and is a Grade II listed building.

The bridge was restored by Great Grimsby Borough Council c. 1980.

== Operation ==
Although the old dock is now virtually inactive of shipping, the bridge is covered by an act of parliament requiring it to be lifted upon certain requests. Requests were made in the 1990s to allow the historical Ross Tiger and PS Lincoln Castle vessels to enter the old dock and be permanently berthed to serve as museum pieces and restaurants respectively.

The bridge is still occasionally lifted for testing purposes, most recently being done so in May 2016. In 2017, after weeks of repair work, engineers were not able to carry out a test lift of the bridge. A restoration project was carried out from February 2023, funded by the Department of Transport (£2.967m), North East Lincolnshire Council (£1.83m) and the Local Transport Fund (£170,000). As of December 2024, the restoration work is ongoing and there is no given completion date.
