= Riby Street Platform railway station =

Former railway station in Lincolnshire, England

Riby Street Platform

General information
- Location: Grimsby, Lincolnshire; England
- Coordinates: 53.5762°N 0.0729°W
- Grid reference: TA277106
- Platforms: 2

Other information
- Status: Disused

History
- Original company: Great Central Railway
- Pre-grouping: Great Central Railway
- Post-grouping: LNER

Key dates
- by October 1904: opened for unadvertised workmen service
- 4 June 1917: public advertised service
- April 1919: reverted to unadvertised workmen service
- 14 April 1941: closed
Location

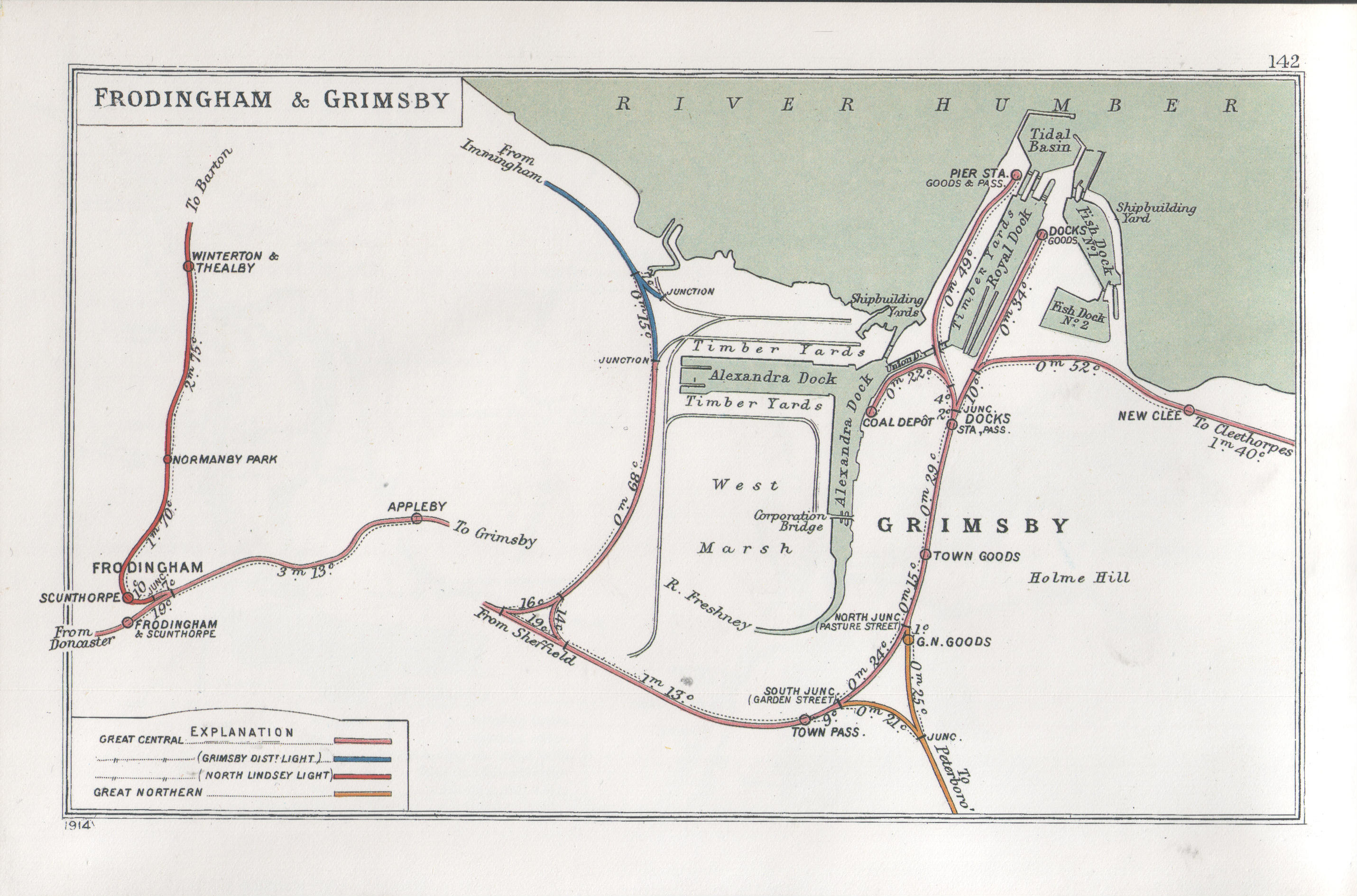
Railways around Grimsby Docks railway station in 1914

Riby Street Platform was a railway station which served the Riby Street area of Grimsby from 1904 to 1941. It was opened by the Great Central Railway to serve the first dock in Grimsby but was closed during World War II and never reopened. A source with local knowledge refers to the station as "Riby Street Platforms".

The station was known as "Skateknob Junction" by workers at the nearby fish docks. It consisted of two narrow wooden platforms connected by a footbridge. Although the platforms had been removed, the footbridge was still plain to see in 1961.

== Services ==
The station was opened in 1904 aiming at services for workers at the adjacent docks, most of which were unadvertised. Public advertised service only 1917-1919 and accordingly it is not shown in the July 1922 Bradshaw.

== Aftermath ==
By 2015 no trace of the station could be found. The line through the station site had been reduced to single track, but a regular passenger service to Cleethorpes. No railborne fish traffic had been carried from Grimsby for many years.

Preceding station	Historical railways	Following station
Grimsby Docks Line and station open	Great Central Railway Great Grimsby and Sheffield Junction Railway	New Clee Line and station open
