= Associated British Ports =

British transport company

- Type: Private
- Traded as: LSE: ABP
- Industry: Logistics
- Predecessor: British Transport Docks Board
- Founded: 1983
- Headquarters: London, England
- Number of locations: 19
- Area served: United Kingdom
- Subsidiaries: See below
- Website: www.abports.co.uk

Associated British Ports (ABP) owns and operates a network of 19 ports across England, Scotland and Wales and is the UK's largest port operator. Its ports handle around a quarter of UK seaborne trade.

ABP's activities include port and terminal operations, cargo handling, marine and logistics services, property development, dredging and marine consultancy. Its ports handle a range of cargoes including containers, vehicles, dry and liquid bulk commodities, steel and other metals, forest products and project cargo, as well as supporting cruise, ferry and offshore energy operaitons.

The group includes major UK ports such as Southampton, Immingham and Hull, alongside a network of regional ports serving industrial, manufacturing, energy and logistics markets. ABP is also involved in the development of infrastructure for the offshore wind and energy sectors.

== History ==
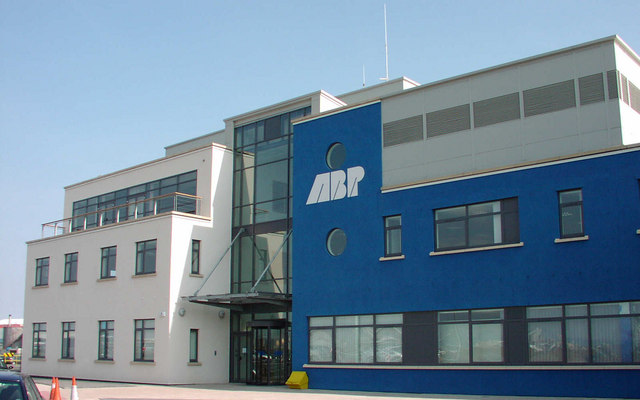
Queen Alexandra House, Cardiff Bay

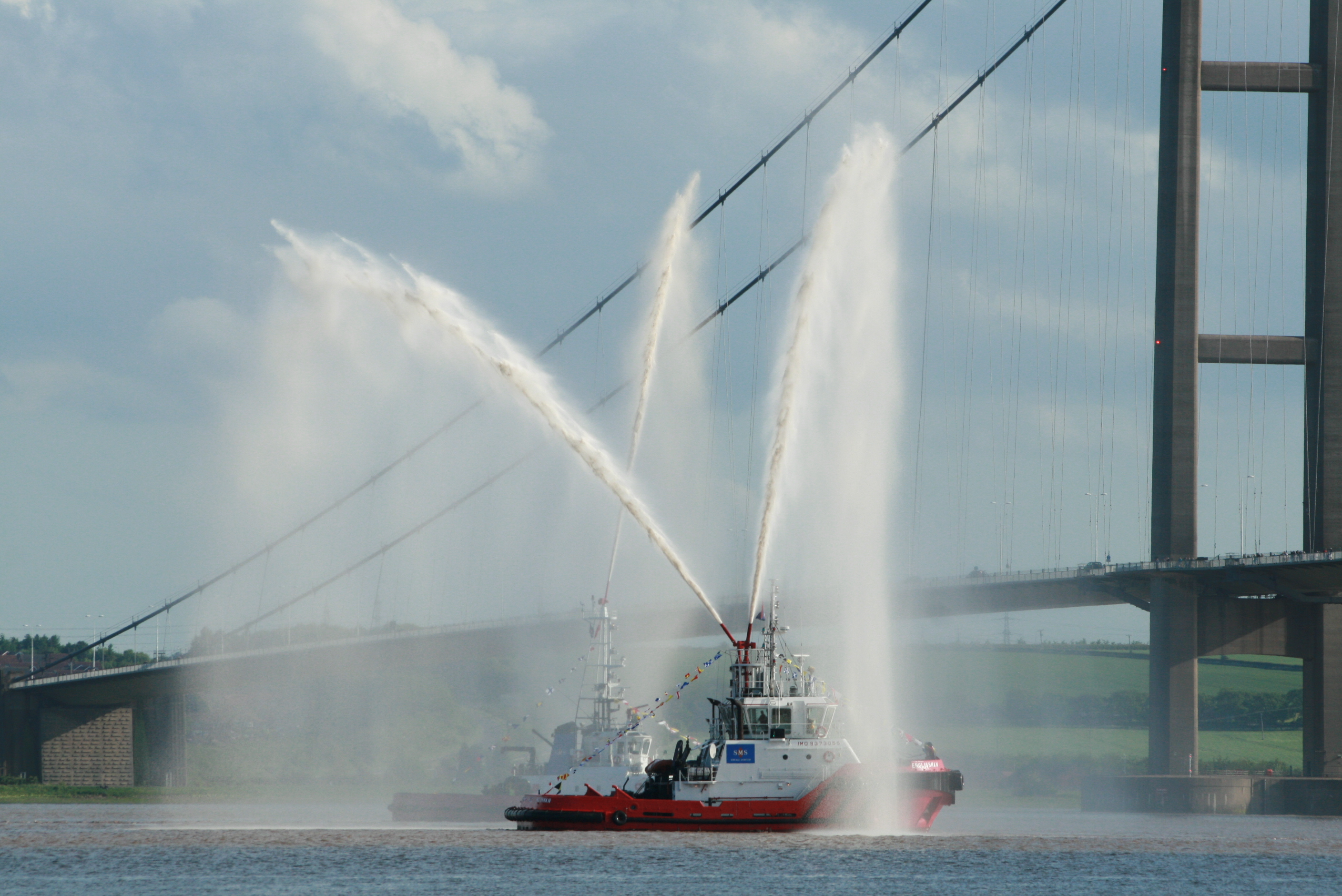
Tugboat Englishman from Associated British Ports at the celebrations of the Diamond Jubilee of Elizabeth II on 4 June 2012 at the Humber Bridge

Ports formerly owned by rail and canal companies were nationalised in 1947 by the Attlee government, forming part of the operations of the British Transport Commission. The commission was split in 1962 by the Transport Act 1962; the British Transport Docks Board (BTDB) was formed in 1962 as a government-owned body to manage various ports throughout the United Kingdom.

In 1981 the government of Thatcher government implemented the Transport Act 1981, which provided for the BTDB's privatisation. Because of BTDB's statutory powers as a harbour operator, a straightforward conversion to limited company status was impractical. Instead, BTDB was renamed Associated British Ports (ABP) and a limited company, Associated British Ports Holdings Limited (ABPH), was formed, with the same powers in law over ABP as a holding company has over a subsidiary.

In 1983 ABP was listed on the London Stock Exchange. In August 2006 ABP was taken over by a private consortium led by Goldman Sachs and delisted from the London Stock Exchange.

From 2006 until 2015, the company was owned by a consortium consisting of GS Infrastructure Partners, OMERS, GIC and Prudential. In March 2015, Anchorage Ports, an investment consortium led by the CPP Investments and Hermes Infrastructure, acquired a 33% interest in the business. The Kuwait Investment Authority purchased a 10% interest in the company.

As a result of these transactions the shareholdings in the group holding company as of 2015 were: Borealis Infrastructure (33%), Anchorage Ports (33%), Cheyne GIC (23%) and the Kuwait Investment Authority (10%).

In October 2026, IFM Investors purchased a 64% stake from CPP Investments and OMERS.

== Operations ==
ABP operates a network of 19 ports in England, Scotland and Wales. Its ports collectively handle around 25% of UK seaborne trade.

The group's operations span container and automotive traffic, dry and liquid bulk cargoes, Ro-Ro and ferry services, forest products, steel, construction materials, project cargo, cruise and infrastructure serving the energy industry.

ABP also owns land associated with its ports and undertakes port-related infrastructure and property development.

== Humber ==
ABP operates the ports of Hull, Immingham, Grimsby and Goole on the Humber estuary.

Immingham is one of the UK's largest ports by tonnage and handles bulk commodities, Ro-Ro traffic and other cargoes.

The Port of Hull handles around 10 million tonnes of cargo annually, representing approximately £12 billion in trade. It's activities include containers, Ro-Ro and ferry traffic, forest products and bulk commodities.

Hull is also home to Green Port Hull, and offshore wind manufacturing and assembly complex developed through investment by ABP and Siemens Gamesa. ABP states that the joint investment in the facility totalled approximately £310 million.

== Ports ==
ABP manages the following ports:

- Ayr
- Barrow
- Barry
- Cardiff
- Garston
- Goole
- Grimsby
- Hull
- Imingham
- Ipswich
- King's Lynn
- Lowestoft
- Newport
- Plymouth (Millbay Docks)
- Port Talbot
- Solent Gateway
- Southampton
- Swansea
- Teignmouth
- Troon
