= Logan and Hemingway =

Logan and Hemingway was a firm of British civil engineering contractors.

The firm was an awarded a number of contracts by the Manchester, Sheffield and Lincolnshire Railway and its successor the Great Central Railway, including expansion of the company's No.1 Fish Dock at the Port of Grimsby in the 1870s. parts of the company's London extension (Great Central Main Line), the company's new station at Nottingham c. 1897 (Nottingham Victoria railway station), and work on the company's pier at New Holland c. 1922.

== See also ==
- John William Logan, partner in the firm and MP
