= British Transport Docks Board =

Nationalised British docks operating company

The British Transport Docks Board (BTDB) was a nationalised industry, managing former railway-owned docks in Great Britain. It was created by the Transport Act 1962 and abolished by the Transport Act 1981, which provided for its privatisation as Associated British Ports.

== History ==
The business had its origins in the ports developed or acquired by the private railway companies. These passed to the British Transport Commission on nationalisation in 1948 and were organised under its Docks and Inland Waterways Executive.

The Transport Act 1962 abolished the commission and distributed its assets to five successor bodies. The British Transport Docks Board inherited the dock undertakings, other than harbours used primarily by railway steamer services.

The BTDB was among the first nationalised industries to be privatised by the Conservative government of Margaret Thatcher. It was privatised under the Transport Act 1981, becoming Associated British Ports.

== See also ==
- Associated British Ports
