= Transport Act 1981 =

Act of the Parliament of the United Kingdom

Transport Act 1981 (Note: Section 43.)
- Act of Parliament
- Parliament of the United Kingdom
- Long title: An Act to make provision with respect to the disposal by the British Railways Board of part of their undertaking, property, rights and liabilities; to provide for the reconstitution of the British Transport Docks Board under the name of Associated British Ports and to confer on a company powers over that body corresponding to the powers of a holding company over a wholly-owned subsidiary; to dissolve the National Ports Council and amend the Harbours Act 1964; to make further provision for promoting road safety; to make provision with respect to road humps; to provide a new basis of vehicle excise duty for goods vehicles; to amend the law as to the payments to be made for cab licences and cab drivers' licences; to make provision for grants to assist the provision of facilities for freight haulage by inland waterway; to make provision with respect to railway fires; to amend Schedules 7 and 8 to the Public Passenger Vehicles Act 1981; and for connected purposes.
- Citation: 1981 c. 56
- Territorial extent: England and Wales; Scotland; Northern Ireland (in part); (Note: Section 41.)

Dates
- Royal assent: 31 July 1981
- Commencement: various (Note: Section 42.)
Other legislation
Amends	Town Police Clauses Act 1847; Public Passenger Vehicles Act 1981
Amended by	Road Traffic Regulation Act 1984; Road Traffic (Consequential Provisions) Act 1988; Powers of Criminal Courts (Sentencing) Act 2000; Statute Law (Repeals) Act 2004

Status: Amended

Text of statute as originally enacted

Text of the Transport Act 1981 as in force today (including any amendments) within the United Kingdom, from legislation.gov.uk.

The Transport Act 1981 (c. 56) is an act of the Parliament of the United Kingdom. Amongst other items it introduced the compulsory wearing of seat belts for front seat passengers for a trial period of three years.

The major part of the act was for re-organising the British Transport Docks Board which led to its eventual privatisation.

The act received royal assent 31 July 1981.

== Clauses of the act ==
=== Reorganisation of British Transport Docks Board ===
Part II of the act renamed the British Transport Docks Board as Associated British Ports and made it a subsidiary a holding company limited by shares to be issued by the Secretary of State or their agents, thus making its privatisation possible.

=== Seatbelt legislation ===
It had been compulsory to fit front seat belts to cars built in Europe since 1965 and to all new cars sold in the UK since 1967. The Clunk Click" TV commercials, starring Jimmy Savile showing the dangers of being thrown through the windscreen in a collision was shown during the 1970s. Attempts were made to make the wearing of front seat belts compulsory in a Road Traffic Bill in 1973-4 but were unsuccessful. John Gilbert, the Minister of Transport proposed a 'Road Traffic (Seat Belts) Bill' in 1976 but it was also unsuccessful. Four further attempts at legislation were made by a number of MPs including Bill Rodgers and Neil Carmichael before Lord Nugent (who was also the president of the Royal Society for the Prevention of Accidents) was finally successful, initially by proposing a private member's bill, and then by adding it as an amendment to the Transport Bill in the House of Lords. The House of Commons voted to accept the amendment on 28 July 1981.

Legacy

Following the three-year trial the compulsory wearing of seat belts was made permanent when both Houses of Parliament voted 'overwhelmingly' to retain the requirement. Legislation was subsequently introduced for the compulsory fitting of seat belts to the rear of cars (1987), for children to wear seat belts in the back (1989), and then adults (1991). Seat belts were required for minibuses and coaches carrying school children (1996) and for all coaches (2001).
