= New Clee railway station =

Railway station in Lincolnshire, England

New Clee
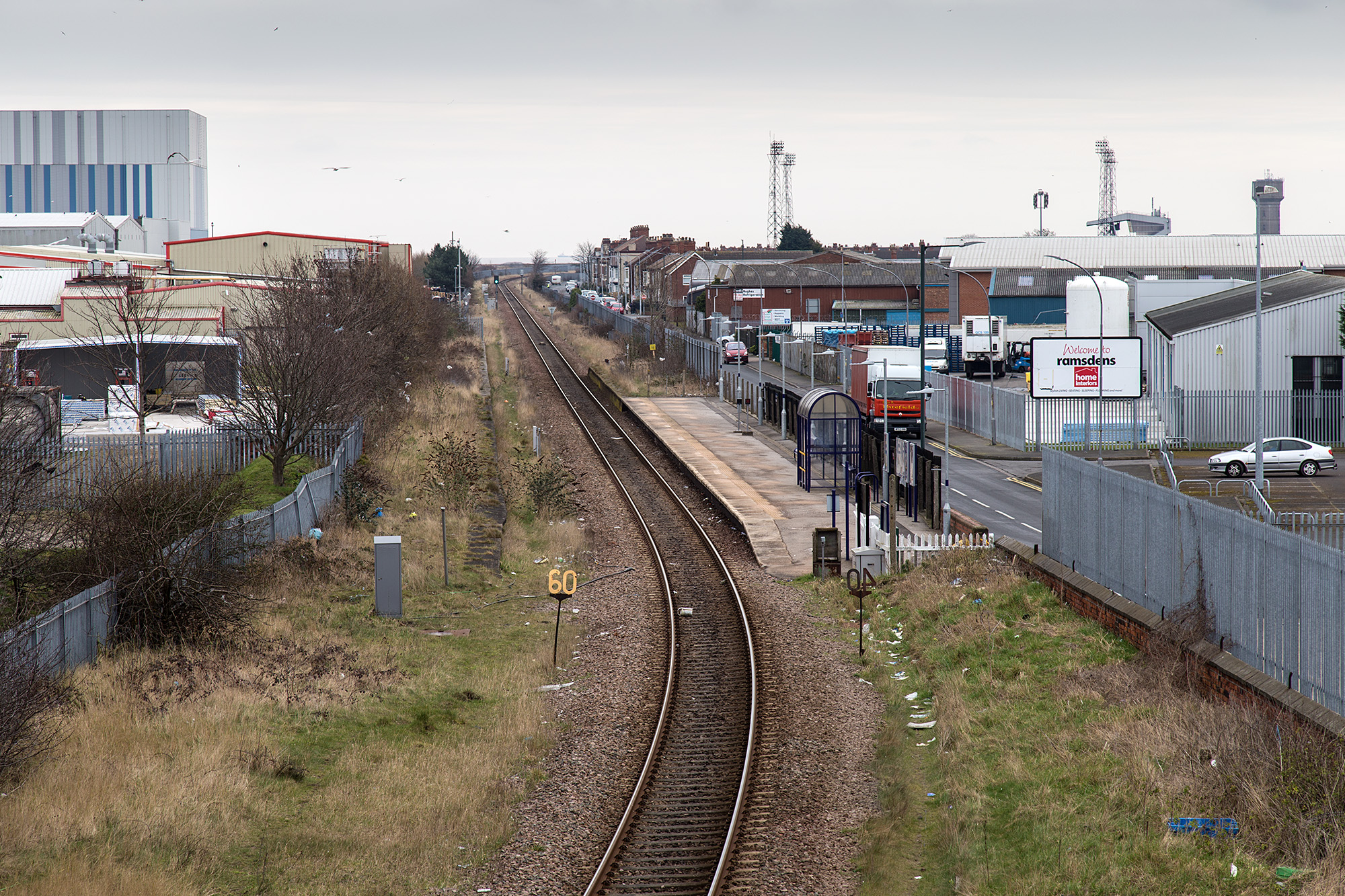
- New Clee railway station seen in 2016

General information
- Location: New Clee, North East Lincolnshire; England
- Coordinates: 53.574313°N 0.060549°W
- Grid reference: TA286103
- Manager: East Midlands Railway
- Platforms: 1

Other information
- Station code: NCE
- Classification: DfT category F2

History
- Opened: 1875
- Original company: Manchester, Sheffield and Lincolnshire Railway
- Pre-grouping: Great Central Railway
- Post-grouping: London and North Eastern Railway

Passengers
- 2021/22: ▲1,396
- 2022/23: ▲1,596
- 2023/24: ▲2,412
- 2024/25: ▲3,550
- 2025/26: ▼2,802
Location
Notes
- Passenger statistics from the Office of Rail and Road

New Clee railway station serves the suburb of New Clee, Grimsby in North East Lincolnshire, England. New Clee is measured 110 miles 78 chains (178.6 km) from Manchester Piccadilly (via the former Woodhead line) and is only 67 chains (1.3 km) from Grimsby Docks station. The station is managed by East Midlands Railway, who operate all services.

== History ==
The station was opened on 1 July 1875 when New Clee was established. Dixe Wills, in Tiny Stations, writes of the station:

Inaccessible from the docks and hidden on a back street behind the car park of a home furnishings store, the one remaining platform has already lost a third of its length to nature. A second, completely abandoned platform on the far side of what were once two tracks is fast disappearing beneath wild flowers and yellow wildflowers.

== Facilities ==
There are only basic facilities at the station, including a shelter and cycle racks. As there are no facilities to purchase tickets, passengers must buy one in advance, or from the guard on the train.

== Passenger volume ==
Passenger volume at New Clee
	2004–05	2005–06	2006–07	2007–08	2008–09	2009–10	2010–11	2011–12	2012–13	2013–14	2014–15	2015–16	2016–17	2017–18	2018–19	2019–20	2020–21	2021–22	2022–23	2023–24	2024–25
Entries and exits	332	246	336	455	526	322	298	334	290	348	524	458	1,286	1,236	1,720	1,578	154	1,396	1,596	2,412	3,550

The statistics cover twelve month periods that start in April.

== Services ==
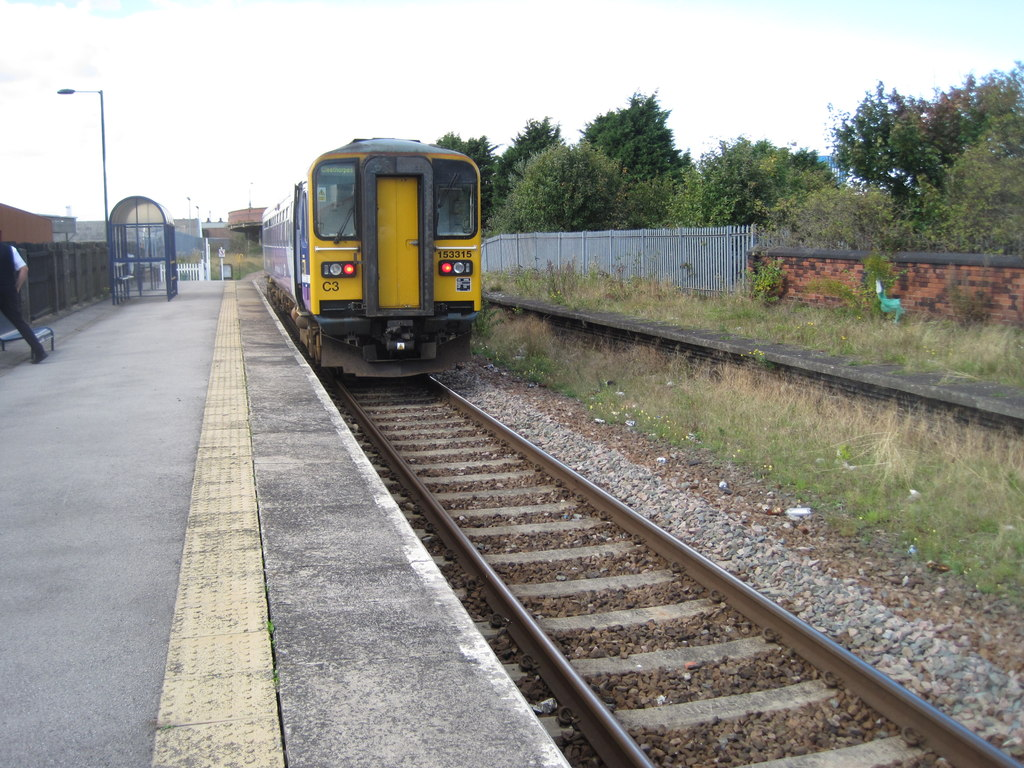
A Northern Rail service calls at the station

The typical off-peak service is one train every two hours in each direction between Cleethorpes and Matlock, with extra services to Barton-on-Humber. On Sundays, the station is served by four trains per day in each direction.

The station was previously a request stop, but is now a compulsory stop for all services.

Preceding station	National Rail	Following station
Grimsby Docks	East Midlands Railway	Cleethorpes
Historical railways
Riby Street Platform Line open, station closed	Great Central Railway Great Grimsby and Sheffield Junction Railway	Cleethorpes Line and station open

== Bibliography ==
- Quick, Michael (2023). Railway Passenger Stations in Great Britain: A Chronology (PDF) (5th ed.). London: Railway and Canal Historical Society.
- Wills, Dixe (2014). Tiny Stations (Paperback, 1st reprint ed.). Basingstoke: AA Publishing. ISBN 978-0-7495-7732-2.
