= Grimsby Pier railway station =

Former railway station in Lincolnshire, England

Grimsby Pier

General information
- Location: Grimsby, Lincolnshire; England
- Coordinates: 53.583121°N 0.071489°W
- Grid reference: TA277114

Other information
- Status: Disused

History
- Original company: Great Grimsby and Sheffield Junction Railway
- Pre-grouping: Manchester, Sheffield and Lincolnshire Railway

Key dates
- 1 August 1853: Opened
- 1939: Closed Completely
Location

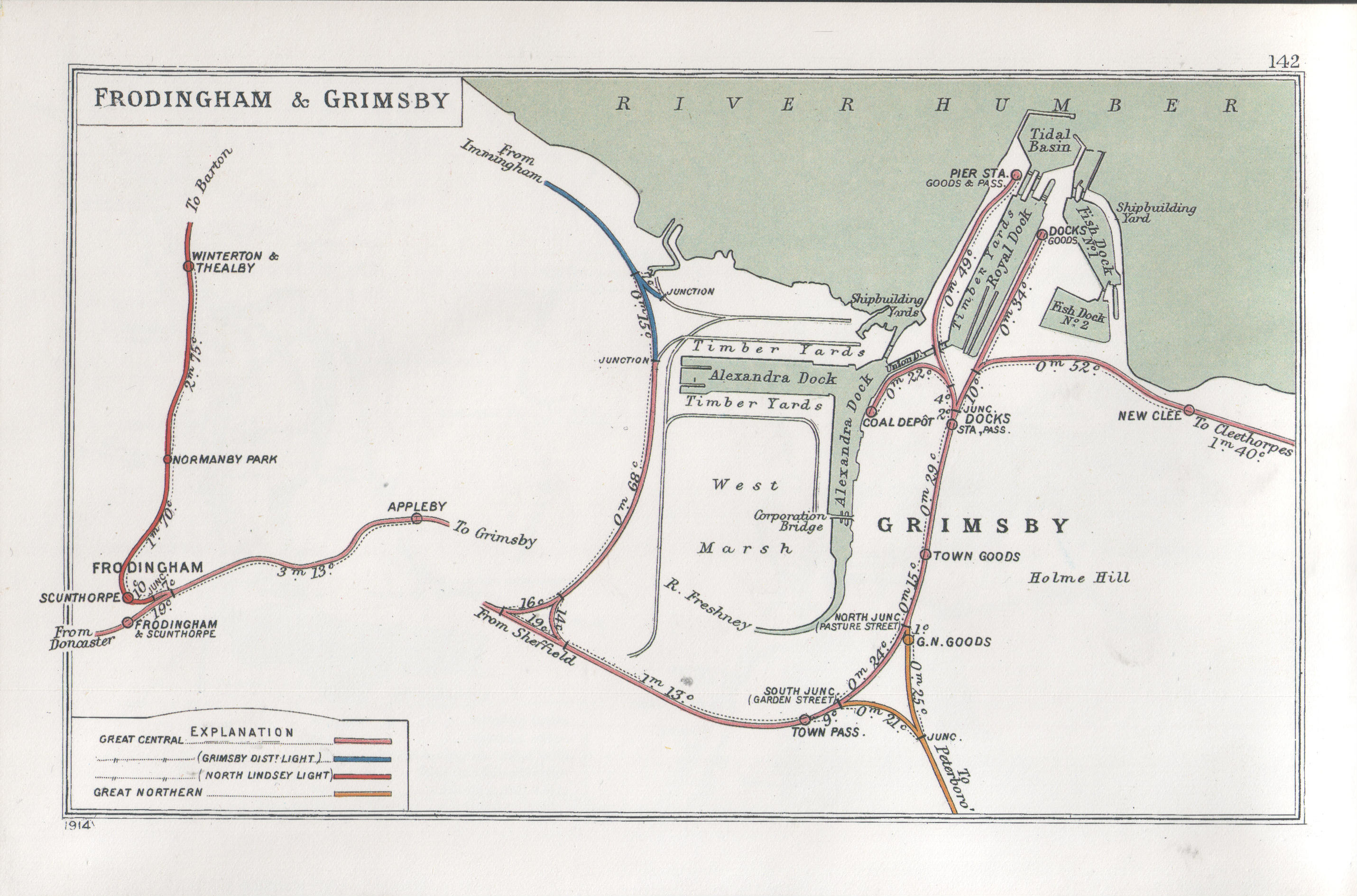
Railways around Grimsby Docks railway station in 1914

Grimsby Pier railway station was sited on the north Royal Dock pier in Grimsby, Lincolnshire, England, between the Tidal Basin arm and the Accumulator Tower.

The station opened in 1853, but sources differ on when it closed. Dow is insistent that it closed in the 1870s and was converted into an Emigrants' Home, Butt supports this with a date of 1879 and Anderson gives 1880. Croughton claims it closed at the outbreak of the First World War, whilst a reply to an enquiry to The Railway Magazine implied the station closed at the outbreak of The Second World War. OS Maps corroborate the first three.

Boat trains undoubtedly continued to run to the quayside at Grimsby up to 1939, but a station, as such, at the pier was not needed. Passengers were assisted off trains and escorted direct to adjacent ships and vice versa, much as at Immingham Eastern Jetty.

As the conversion of the station to an Emigrants' Home suggests, the erstwhile Pier Station was used as transit accommodation for people making their way to the New World, typically arriving from Europe by ship then travelling via the GCR to Liverpool for final embarkation.

The station was accessed via a spur from Grimsby Docks station.

The substantial building survived until at least 1960 but by 2015 no trace remained.

== Services ==
The station was used by Great Central Railway emigrant trains to Liverpool and boat trains across the North Sea, principally to Hamburg.

Preceding station	Disused railways	Following station
Grimsby Pyewipe Road	MSLR	Terminus
Grimsby Docks	MSLR	Terminus
