= Grimsby Docks railway station =

Railway station in Lincolnshire, England

Grimsby Docks
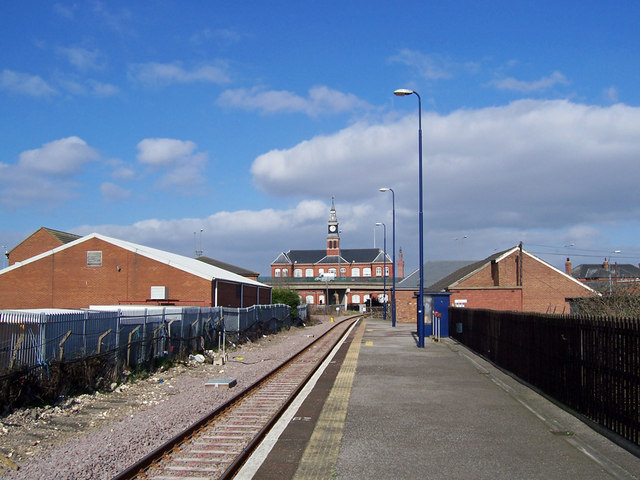

General information
- Location: Grimsby, North East Lincolnshire; England
- Coordinates: 53.574°N 0.076°W
- Grid reference: TA274103
- Manager: East Midlands Railway
- Platforms: 1

Other information
- Station code: GMD
- Classification: DfT category F2

Passengers
- 2021/22: ▲2,078
- 2022/23: ▲2,958
- 2023/24: ▲3,492
- 2024/25: ▲3,676
- 2025/26: ▼3,474
Location
Notes
- Passenger statistics from the Office of Rail and Road

Grimsby Docks railway station serves the Freeman Street area of Grimsby in North East Lincolnshire, England. This is one of the oldest parts of the town, close to the Freeman Street Market and the town's docks both commercial and fish, the railway entrance to both being over the level crossing at the Cleethorpes end. The docks offices can be seen in the photograph in the distance, in which the line to Cleethorpes swings round to the right.

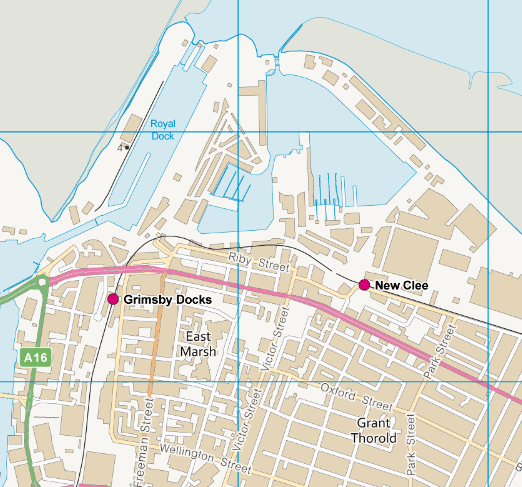
Location map of Grimsby Docks railway station

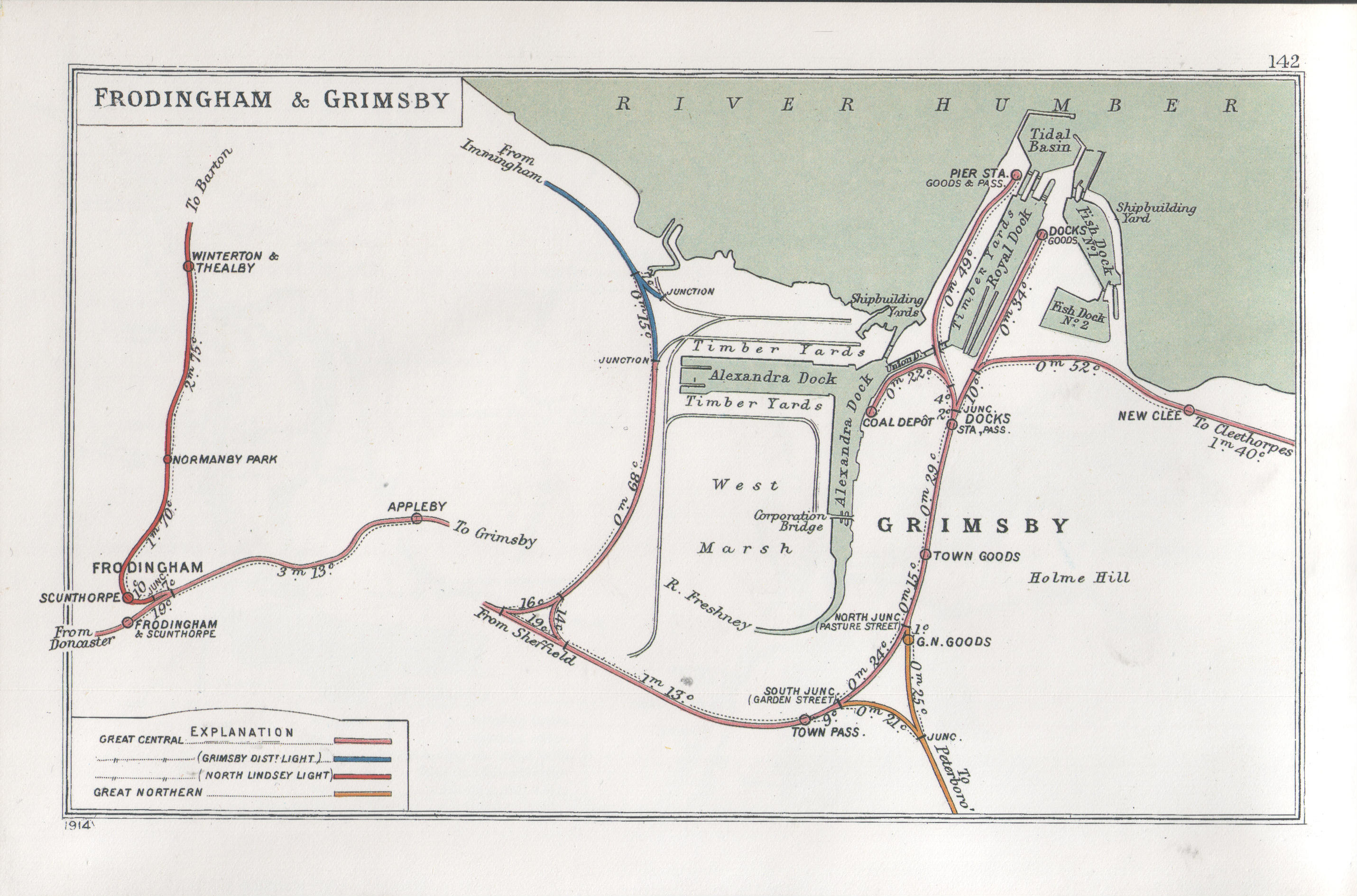
Railways around Grimsby Docks railway station in 1914

The station had miles of sidings for the storage of fish vans to its rear and was double track.

Between 19 September and 2 October 1993, the main line east of Brocklesby Junction was closed to allow for the completion and commissioning of the Grimsby area Resignalling scheme. The double track line east of Grimsby Town was reduced to single and the whole line was resignalled to colour lights operated from Pasture Street signal box. A short passing loop, enough for the present day traffic, is located towards Pasture Street. Signalling control on the line was transferred to the York Rail Operating Centre in January 2016 and the box at Pasture Street was decommissioned and demolished.

Although the train service through Grimsby Docks has been chiefly passenger trains, a thriving freight service originated from the nearby Fish Docks. Prior to the building of the present Cleethorpes Road bridge, a complex railway junction and level crossing was situated on the Cleethorpes side of Grimsby Docks station. The loss of the fresh fish traffic from rail to road eventually resulted in the removal of the junction. The level crossing, being on a major route between Grimsby town and Cleethorpes, was the cause for many delays on Cleethorpe Road. In the mid-1960s, it was subsequently removed in favour of a concrete-built road bridge. The bridge itself caused the wholesale demolition of several buildings housing numerous businesses, banks, public houses and a major hotel (run by the parents of actress Patricia Hodge) but by the time of its completion in 1967 the changes in transportation of fish had made both the bridge and the station redundant.

The town's main railway station is Grimsby Town, located in the town centre.

The station has the Plusbus scheme where train and bus tickets can be bought together at a saving: it is in the same area as Grimsby and Cleethorpes stations.

== Facilities ==
The station is unstaffed and has very basic amenities (bench seating, a waiting shelter, timetable poster board and public telephone). All tickets have to be purchased prior to travel or on the train. Step-free access is available from the entrance and car park to the platform.

== Services ==
All services at Grimsby Docks are operated by East Midlands Railway using Class 170 DMUs.

The typical off-peak service is one train every two hours in each direction between Cleethorpes and Matlock.

On Sundays, the station is served by four trains per day in each direction.

Preceding station	National Rail	Following station
Grimsby Town	East Midlands Railway	New Clee
Historical railways
Grimsby Town Line and station open	Great Central Railway Great Grimsby and Sheffield Junction Railway	Grimsby Pier Line and station closed
Grimsby Town Line and station open	Great Central Railway Great Grimsby and Sheffield Junction Railway	Riby Street Platform Line open, station closed
