= PS Tattershall Castle =

Floating pub and restaurant on the Thames

Coordinates: 51.5056°N 0.1222°W

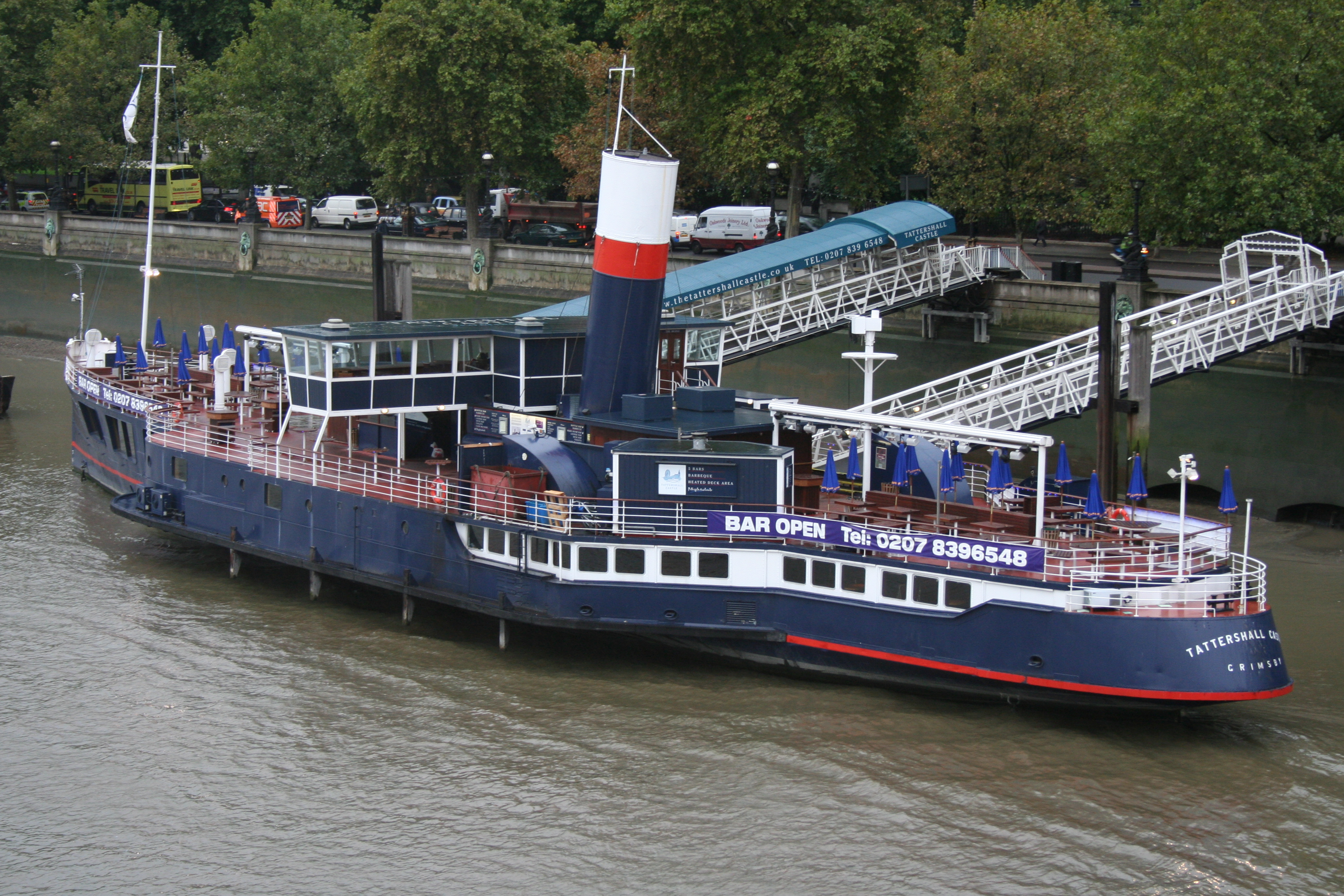
- PS Tattershall Castle on the River Thames at the Victoria Embankment in London

History

United Kingdom
- Name: Tattershall Castle
- Namesake: Tattershall Castle, Lincolnshire
- Owner: LNER (1934–48); BTC (1948–63}; British Railways (1963–74); Chef & Brewer (1982–2004); Tattershall Castle Group (2005–2015); Stonegate Pub Company (2015–present)
- Route: Humber Ferry crossing (1934–74); River Thames (1981–present)
- Ordered: 1934
- Builder: William Gray & Co, West Hartlepool
- Yard number: 1059
- Launched: 24 September 1934
- Commissioned: 24 September 1934
- Decommissioned: 1974
- Out of service: 1974
- Identification: IMO number: 5353804
- Status: Restaurant and bar moored on the River Thames

General characteristics
- Type: Paddle steamer
- Tonnage: 550 GRT, 321 NRT
- Length: 199.9 ft (60.9 m)
- Beam: 33.1 ft (10.1 m) (hull); 56 ft (17 m) (including paddle box)
- Depth: 7.7 ft (2.3 m)
- Installed power: 1200 ihp
- Propulsion: Triple expansion, diagonal stroke, reciprocating steam engine
- Speed: 12 knots (22 km/h; 14 mph)

PS Tattershall Castle is a floating pub and restaurant moored on the River Thames at Victoria Embankment. It was a passenger ferry across the Humber estuary from 1934 to 1973, before being towed to London in 1976.

== History ==
William Gray & Company of West Hartlepool built the ship as a passenger ferry on the Humber for the London and North Eastern Railway (LNER). She was launched on 24 September 1934. She plied the Humber Ferry route between Corporation Pier in Kingston upon Hull, Yorkshire, and New Holland Pier in New Holland, Lincolnshire.

In the Second World War she was a tether for barrage balloons and ferried troops and supplies along the Humber estuary. Due to the frequent heavy fogs on this river, she was fitted with radar, becoming one of the first civilian ships so equipped. After the war, with the nationalisation of the railways in 1948, she became part of British Rail's Sealink service.

In 1973, after long service as a passenger and goods ferry, she was retired and laid up. Repairs on the ship were deemed too costly and she was retired from service. The opening of the Humber Bridge made the ferry service redundant.

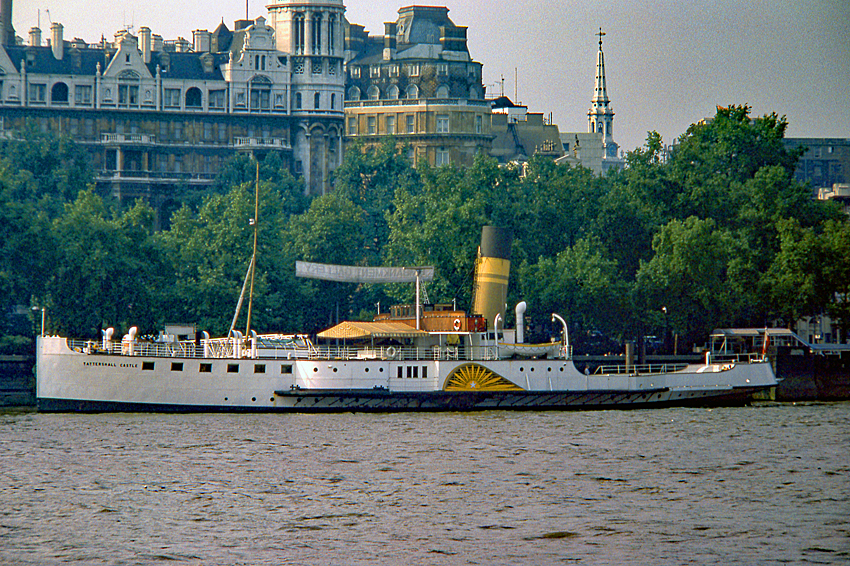
Tattershall Castle moored on the Embankment as an art gallery

In 1976 Tattershall Castle was towed to London and was opened on the River Thames as a floating art gallery until her eventual disposal to the Chef & Brewer group. Before opening in 1982 as a restaurant, she was sent to the River Medway for further repairs. Tattershall Castle returned temporarily to Hull for a refit at MMS Ship Repair in 2015, at a cost of several million pounds.

A sister ship also launched in 1934, the Wingfield Castle, is preserved at Hartlepool's Maritime Experience.

A third similar Humber ferry, the Lincoln Castle, built in 1940, was scrapped in autumn 2010.

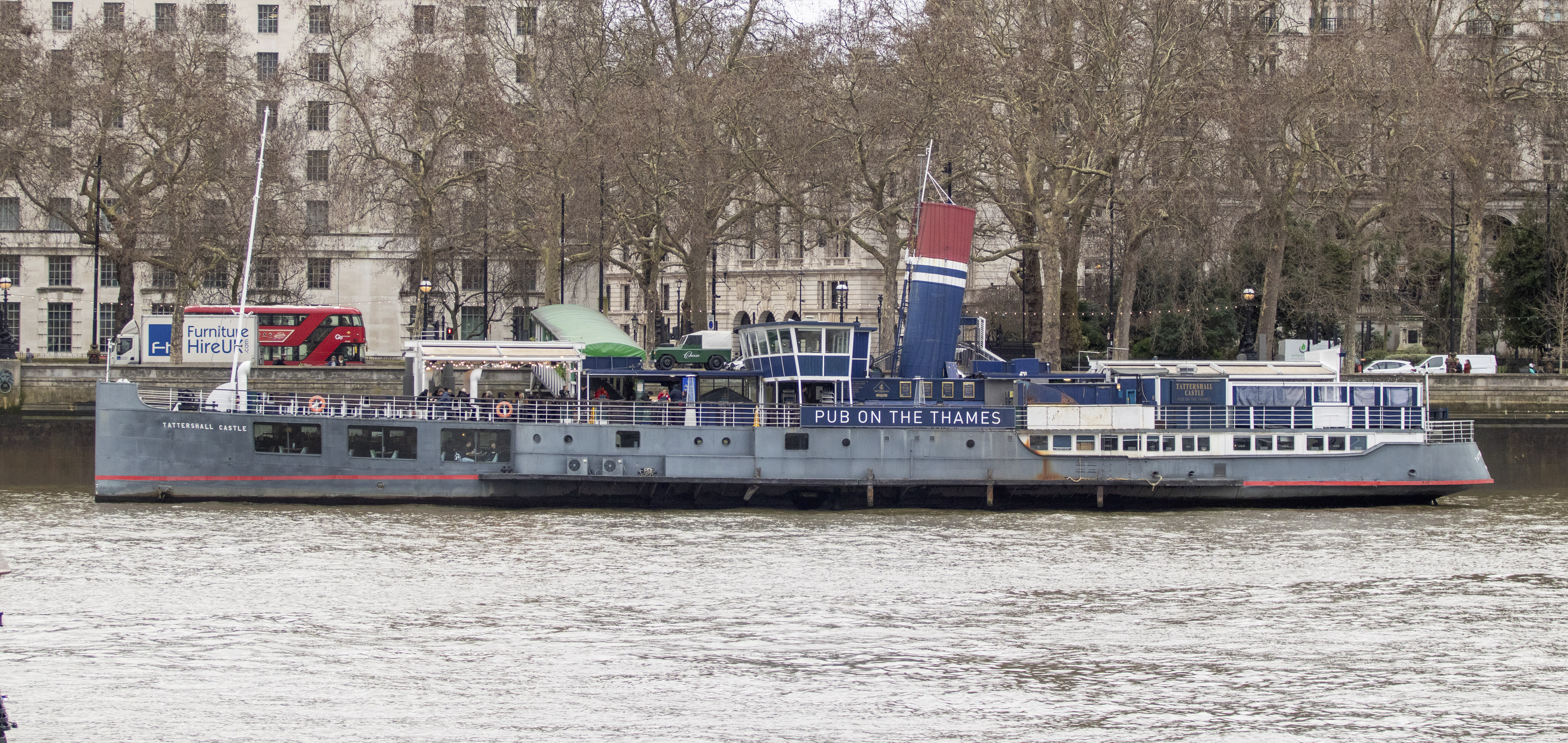
Tattershall Castle in front of Whitehall Court in 2026
