= New Holland Town railway station =

Former railway station in Lincolnshire, England

New Holland Town
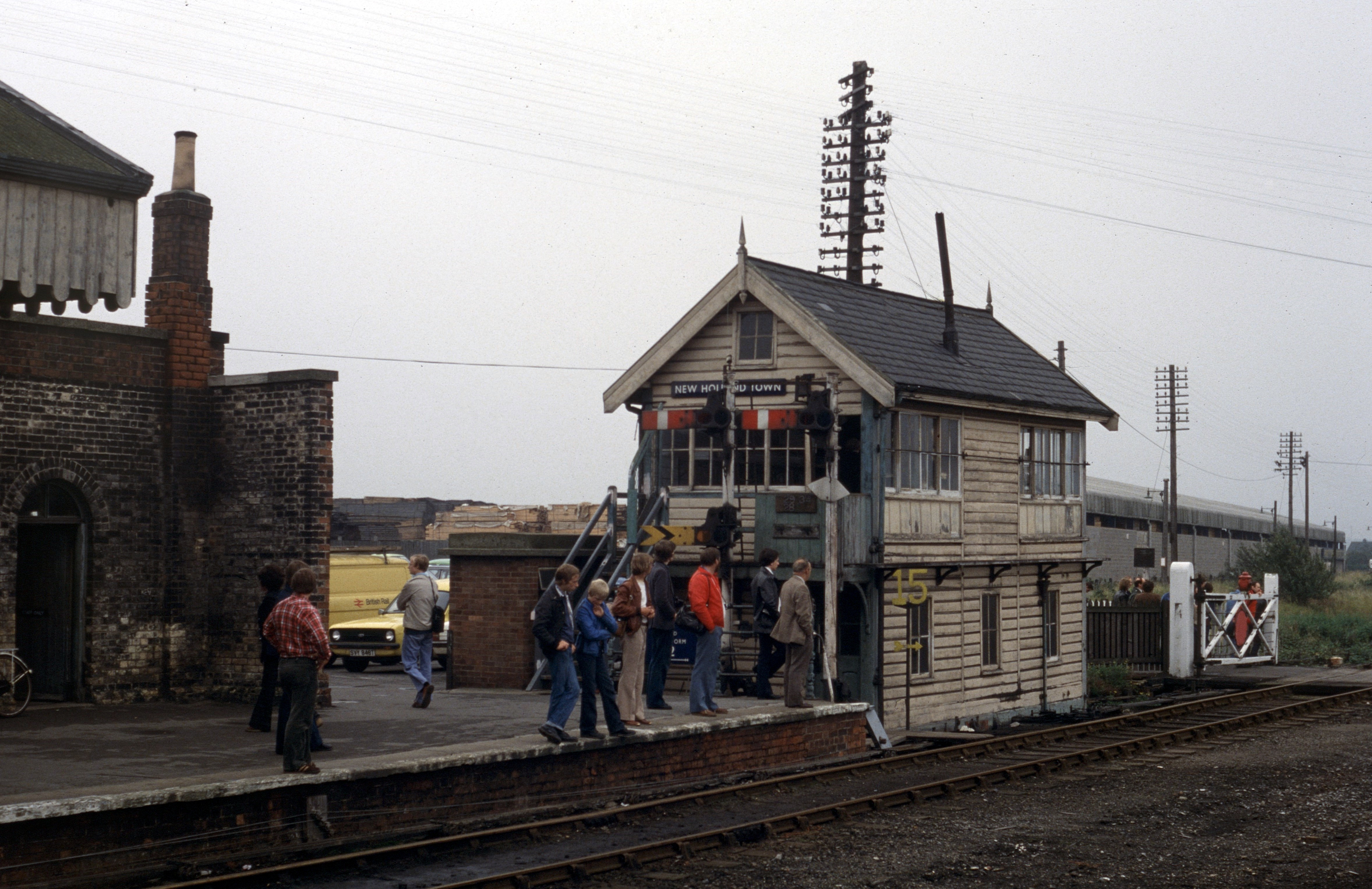
- The station during the farewells railtour in 1980

General information
- Location: New Holland, Lincolnshire; England
- Coordinates: 53.7045°N 0.3635°W
- Grid reference: TA081243
- Platforms: 2

Other information
- Status: Disused

History
- Original company: Great Grimsby and Sheffield Junction Railway
- Pre-grouping: Great Central Railway
- Post-grouping: LNER

Key dates
- 1 March 1848: opened
- 24 June 1981: closed
Location

New Holland Town railway station is a former railway station in the village of New Holland in North Lincolnshire, England. It stood at the landward end of the pier, while the purpose of Pier station, which juts 1,375 feet (419 m) northwards into the Humber estuary, was to enable railway passengers and goods to transfer to and from ferries plying between New Holland and Hull. New Holland Town station's purpose was for more conventional use by the local community.

New Holland was a "railway village" in the sense that Crewe was a railway town. Expanding the dock, building the pier, the engine shed and the railway to it were promoted and started by the Great Grimsby and Sheffield Junction Railway, though by the time services began that railway had merged with others to form the Manchester, Sheffield and Lincolnshire Railway. For many years GCR laundry from restaurant cars and hotels was brought to New Holland for cleaning.

== History ==
The station opened on 1 March 1848 following a directors' tour of the ferry and route as far as Louth the day before.

Services in the early days were a mix of local and long-distance. The line was seen as the gateway to Hull, with the transshipment of people and goods being a mere inconvenience. Before long lines reached Hull via Doncaster, so passengers and railways alike realised that longer could be quicker and more convenient. After this the pier and railway eventually settled down to providing local services across the Humber.

These were:

Ferry from Hull to New Holland Pier then train via New Holland Town:

- to Barton-on-Humber
- to Cleethorpes via Grimsby,

and, from 1911

- to Immingham Dock

The Immingham service ceased in 1963, but the other two survived until 1981.

The station had two platforms with either one or two through lines between and, originally, an overall roof which was later removed. However, no published photograph or track diagram shows more than one through line or space for more than one. The station buildings were made of masonry and were more substantial on the eastern side.

Average daily traffic along the pier in its peak years was 30000 passengers, 250 vehicles, 1200 cattle and sheep and 300 tons of luggage. This needs corroboration as it would imply 60 trains each carrying 500 passengers a day. Until the end of the Second World War publicity, tickets and timetables rarely differentiated between the Town and Pier stations, with the July 1922 Bradshaw, for example, giving a single entry for "New Holland."

The station was closed and the ferry withdrawn on 24 June 1981 when the Humber Bridge opened. New Holland pier was taken over by New Holland Bulk Services who started a grain and feed import and export business in 1984.

When the station and its neighbour New Holland Pier were closed they were replaced by a wholly new New Holland station south of the former. This new station forms an integral part of the Barton Line.

New Holland Town station has been demolished.

== Route ==
Preceding station	Disused railways	Following station
New Holland Pier; Line and station closed	Great Central Railway; Manchester, Sheffield and Lincolnshire Railway	Goxhill; Line closed, station open
New Holland Pier; Line and station closed	Great Central Railway; Manchester, Sheffield and Lincolnshire Railway	Barrow Haven; Line closed, station open
