= PS Lincoln Castle =

English side-wheel paddle steamer

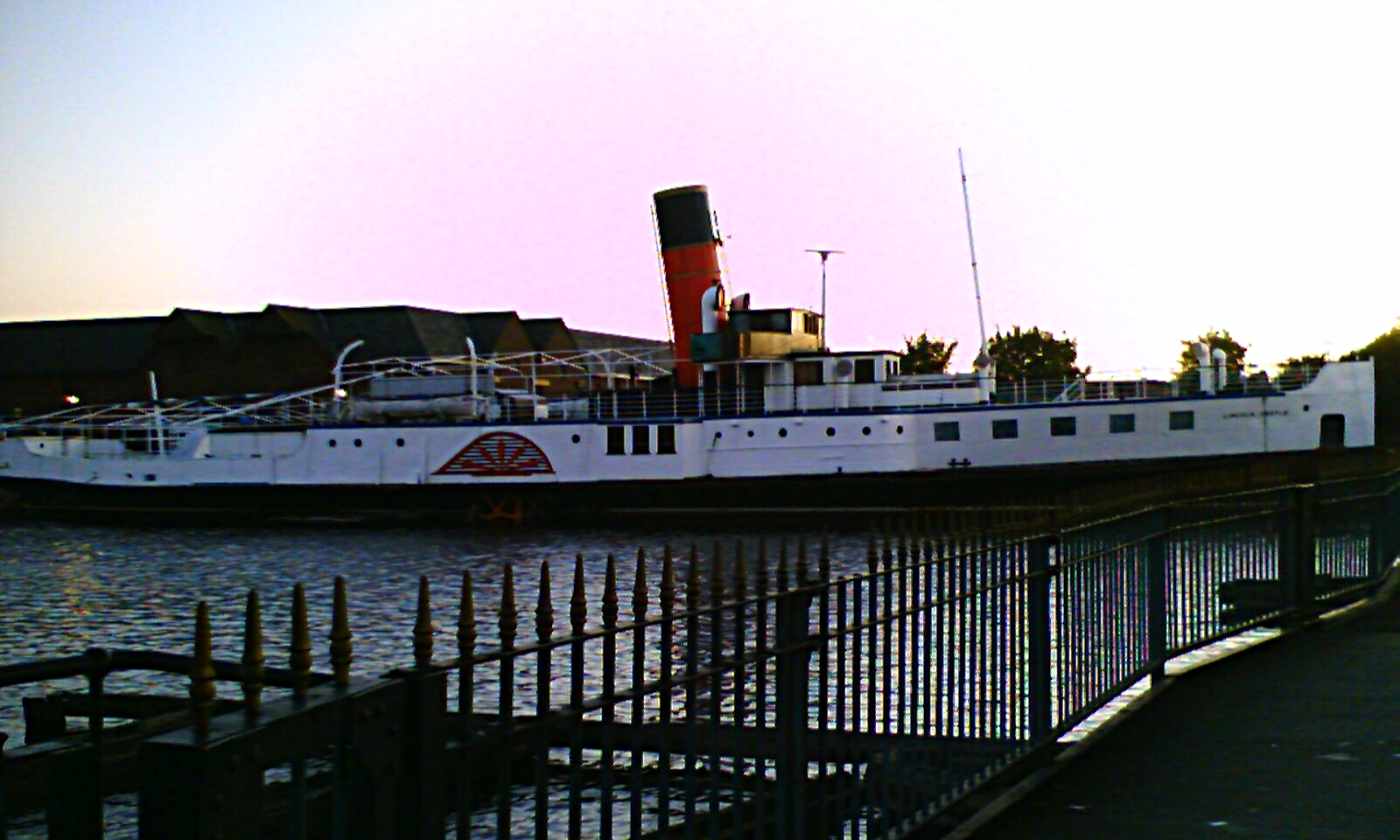
- The PS Lincoln Castle at Alexandra Dock, Grimsby.

History

United Kingdom
- Name: PS Lincoln Castle
- Namesake: Lincoln Castle
- Owner: 1941-1947: LNER, 1948-1978: British Rail Sealink
- Operator: LNER; Sealink
- Port of registry: Grimsby
- Route: 1941–1978: New Holland to Hull ferry service.; since 1981: Moored on the Humber
- Ordered: 1939
- Builder: A. & J. Inglis, Pointhouse, Glasgow
- Christened: 27 April 1940
- Completed: 4 July 1941
- Maiden voyage: 4 August 1941
- In service: 1941-1978
- Home port: Grimsby, Lincolnshire
- Identification: IMO number: 5208671
- Fate: Broken up in Alexandra Dock, Grimsby

General characteristics
- Type: Paddle steamer
- Tonnage: 598 GRT
- Length: 209 ft (64 m)
- Beam: 56 ft (17 m) (including paddle box)
- Propulsion: Triple expansion, diagonal stroke, reciprocating steam engine by Ailsa of Troon, 850 hp.
- Speed: 12.0 knots (22.2 km/h; 13.8 mph)

PS Lincoln Castle was a coal-fired side-wheel paddle steamer, which ferried passengers across the Humber from the 1941 until 1978. She was the last coal-fired paddle steamer still in regular services in the UK. Later, she served as a pub at Hessle, and then as a restaurant under permanent dock at Alexandra Dock, Grimsby. In September 2010, the Hull Daily Mail reported that she was in an advanced state of demolition, despite the efforts of local people to buy the historic vessel and restore her. On 31 March 2011, the Lincoln Castle Preservation Society were reported to have purchased the broken up parts of the ship for restoration.

== Design ==
The PS Lincoln Castle was built as a great refinement on the earlier Humber ferry sisters, the PS Tattershall Castle and PS Wingfield Castle and was a different vessel in concept and construction. She had a straight stem and counter stern with the usual good lines of such a vessel though the paddle boxes and sponsons could give an impression of a greater beam. Her length was 209 feet (64 m) and beam 33 feet (10 m), excluding sponsons. She could carry up to twenty cars (on the after deck) and 1,200 passengers.

The PS Lincoln Castle was built with good reason in a different yard from the earlier vessels with a different engine with different layout and vastly different accommodations and equipment as any user of the three would amply testify. It was conceived of as a greatly improved vessel and specification built on experience of some six years with the earlier pair of vessels and other paddle steamers. This vessel was unique; the ultimate design of its type as a sheltered-water paddle-steamer ferry and more advanced than the earlier two on this service from the engineer's and passengers' viewpoints, with superior passenger accommodation and a logical engineering layout, intentionally affording passengers unequalled views of the engine room and the engine in operation.

All her working life, her boiler was coal-fired and its steam used to power a triple expansion diagonal reciprocating engine. This engine, built by Ailsa of Troon, Scotland, was a rare survivor of its type from this manufacturer and of particular historical significance due to its survival within the hull of its intended vessel. The cylinders were respectively 18 and 28.5 and 46 inches (0.46 and 0.72 and 1.17 m) in diameter with a 51 inches (1.3 m) stroke. The PS Lincoln Castle was different from the other vessels in the Humber ferry service in having her boiler forward of her engine, therefore her funnel was further forward than the others; just before midships, abaft the bridge and halfway between her two equally-sized masts.

== Service ==
For years, the Lincoln Castle ferried day-trippers between the banks of the Humber. Before she was laid up in 1981, she was described as "The Lady of the Humber" and was a regular sight on the water between Grimsby and Hull.

The vessel was designed for and operated from New Holland to Hull (an important local factor financially, geographically, economically and socially, as the raison d’être of the ferry operation was to serve the north-east Lincolnshire hinterland of Grimsby in its connexion with the nearest city, Hull and its hinterland) by the London & North Eastern Railway (LNER) in Grimsby by J.F. Wood, the company's Superintendent Marine Engineer and formerly the company's ferry superintendent at New Holland where day-to-day management and operation were carried out. Port of Registry and home port was Grimsby throughout its working life.

The success and importance of this operation can be judged from the fact that the Barton line to New Holland/Barrow Haven and Barton-on-Humber escaped the Beeching cuts while the direct line from Cleethorpes and Grimsby to London was closed.

== History ==
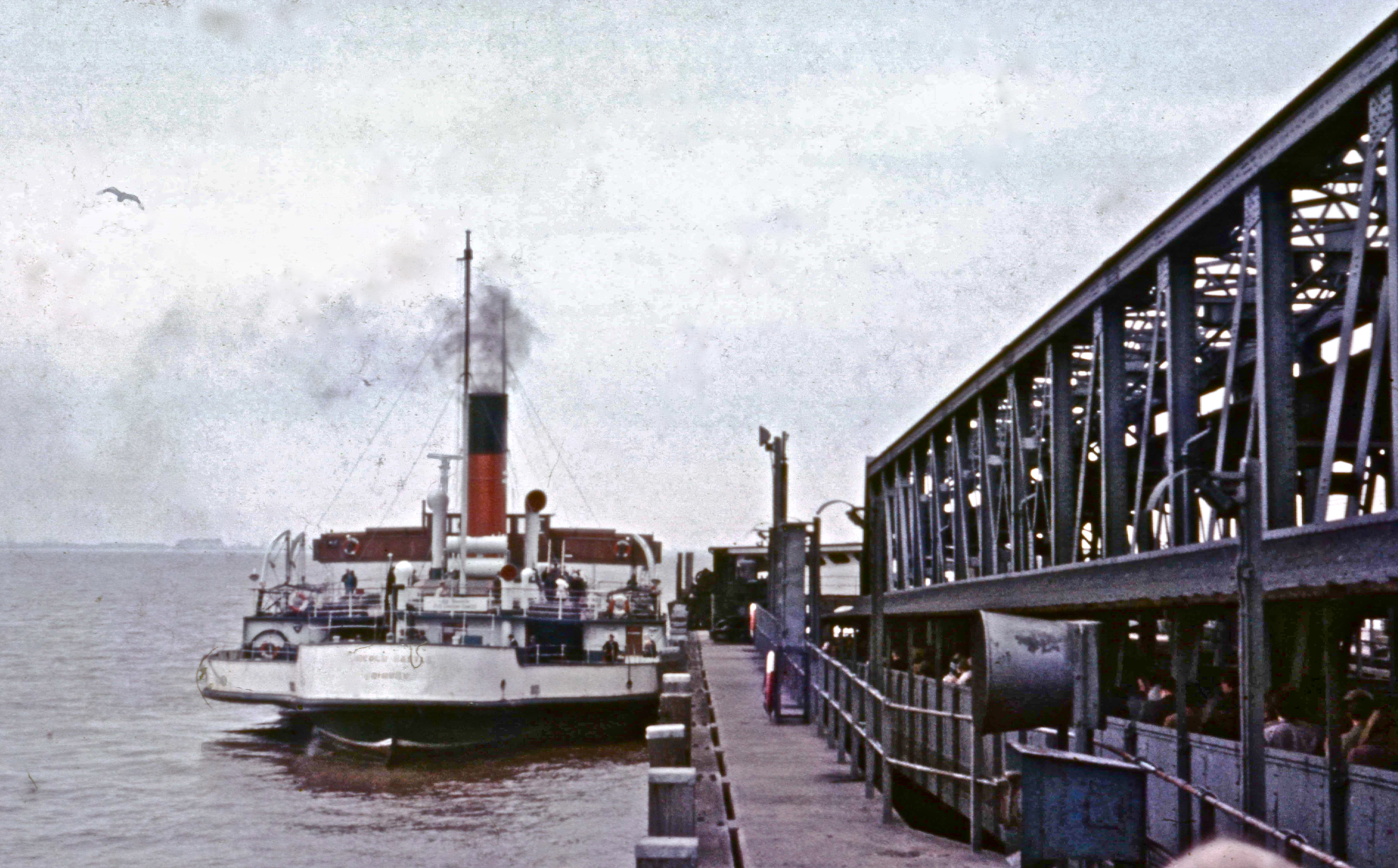
At New Holland Pier in 1975

PS Lincoln Castle was launched on 27 April 1940, by A. & J. Inglis of Pointhouse, Glasgow. She was named after the Norman castle at Lincoln. She was delivered to the LNER at Grimsby's Royal Dock on 4 July 1941 to complement the 1934 Wingfield Castle and Tattershall Castle built by Gray's of Hartlepool. She entered service on 4 August 1941 on the New Holland to Hull public service. The route was operated by the LNER until nationalisation in 1948, when it was taken over by British Railways, later known as British Rail. Lincoln Castle served this route until 1978, under Sealink management, when known to be unable to pass a boiler inspection. At the time of her withdrawal, she was the last coal-fired paddle steamer providing a daily scheduled service in the United Kingdom.

Supporters of the PS Waverley try to boost its credentials by saying it is the last sea-going paddler. Yet the younger ship, built 1946/7, only ever operated on the River Clyde prior to its preservation. This occurred when the PS Lincoln Castle was still in regular service carrying passengers across the Humber.

The paddle steamer was converted into a pub and opened at Hessle, close to the Humber Bridge which had, since 1981, rendered the remaining ferries obsolete. In 1987 she was re-sold and moved to Immingham for refurbishment. Her sponsons and funnel were removed and crankshaft cut to reduce her width and enable her to be pulled into Alexandra Dock at what was to be her last port of call. Re-assembled and refitted and her faulty boiler removed, she opened as a bar and restaurant in 1989 alongside the National Fishing Heritage Centre and Sainsbury's flagship branch on Grimsby's historic original Haven Alexandra Dock, close to the retired fishing trawler Ross Tiger. Thinning of her hull due to corrosion and pinhole seepage through some of her bottom plates led to her being taken out of public use in 2006, a move considered to be only temporary while repairs were conducted. The hull plates were considered to be defective (and thus requiring attention) over 15 percent of the submerged hull of the ship and impossible to replace in-situ. To remedy this would either require the ship's removal to a dry dock, or a partial or complete lining of the lower hull of the vessel with concrete (a recognised repair solution for long term static steel ships which had already been used on the Lincoln Castle's half sister Wingfield Castle). Several 'concrete blocks' already covered leaking plates as later advertised.

As an attraction she was never to re-open.

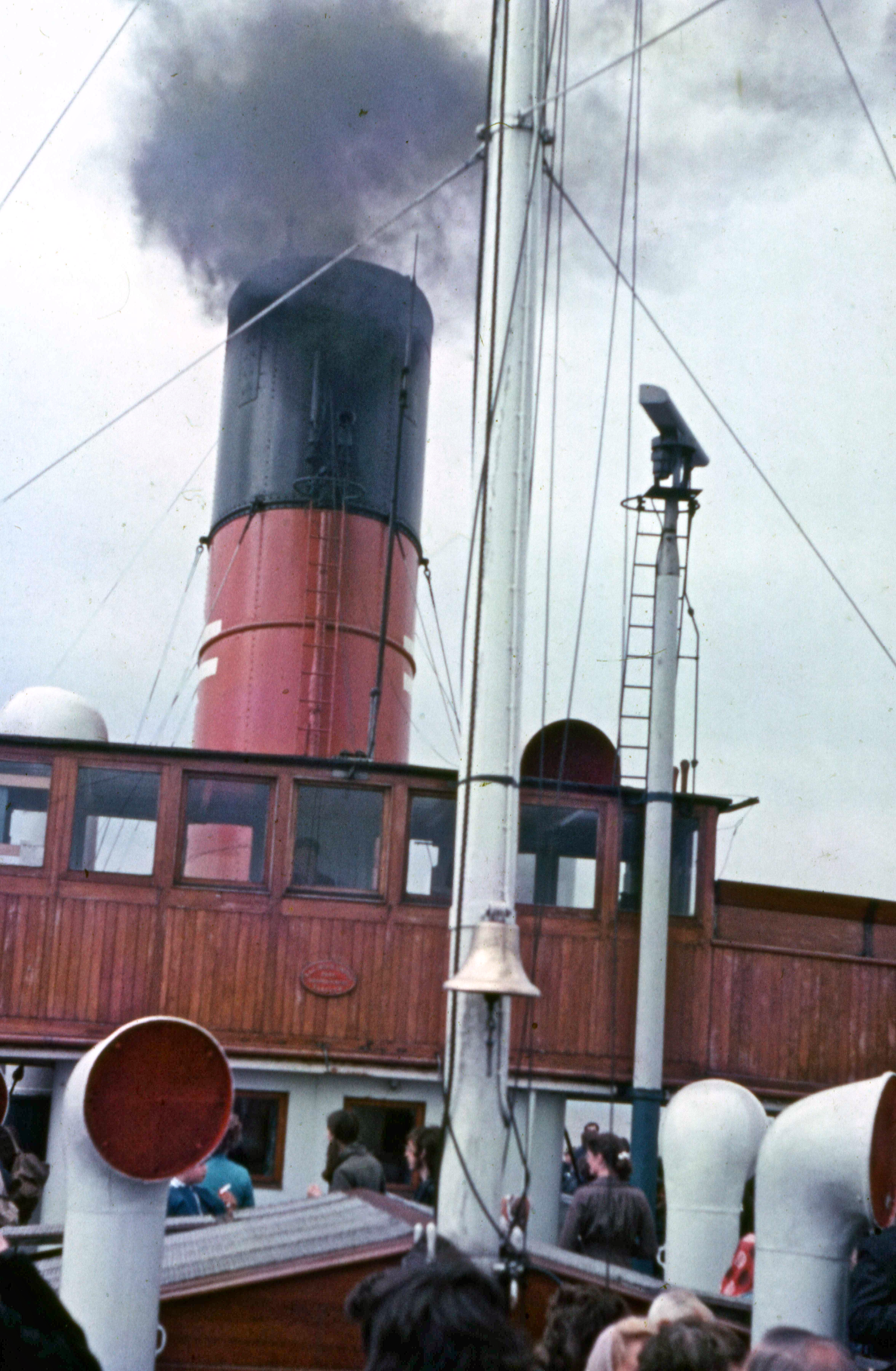
crossing the Humber in 1975

In 2009 it was announced that unless a new owner could be found, the vessel could be scrapped, despite the fact that she was unique (and yet somehow not listed on the Core Register of Historic Ships), and had survived these 70 years in remarkable condition. Before being advertised for sale for a nominal sum, the vessel was offered to the Paddle Steamer Preservation Society who were to seriously consider taking ownership. In the Autumn 2010 issue of the society magazine Paddle Wheels (no 201), the society's chairperson Myra Allen admitted that the decision not to acquire the ship had been 'a heartbreaking one, but our heads had to rule our hearts.' It was also stated that other avenues were being pursued, and that the PSPS was acting in support of the Lincoln Castle Preservation Society, later formed to save the ship when all attempts to purchase it were rejected. In light of what was to follow the society has been criticised for declining to take on the Lincoln Castle, preferring to concentrate on their existing ships, even though one, the MV Balmoral, is not a paddle-steamer.

The ship was advertised for sale by the Marine ship-brokerage firm Norse Shore for the sum of £20,000; the ridiculously low figure was explained by Norse Shore as being due to the vessel requiring partial dismantling in order to be moved from Alexandra Dock. Norse Shore admitted that North East Lincolnshire council had declared that the vessel had no historic interest to them at all, and as responsibility for the dock rested with the council, they were refusing to transfer the existing lease without payment of a bond of £50,000, in effect a guarantee from a new lessee.

It was then that other details emerged suggesting previously unvoiced problems.

The ship's owner was to claim that having been left unused for two decades the channel leading to Alexandra Dock was thought to have silted at the seaward end due to wash from container ships turning as they entered or exited the harbour mouth, requiring dredging to allow free passage (despite the paddle steamer's undoubtedly shallow draught) and that dredging would require insurance to cover possible damage to the channel. Additional dredging at the dock end would have to be carried out to remove the sand bar that had been created to support the ship as it sat in the dock. Similarly, it was claimed that lack of use (and maintenance of moving parts) of the Corporation Bridge that crossed the entrance to the dock proper had provoked speculation that the £50,000 bond amounted to being in effect a 'stealth tax' to ensure funds were available to re-activate the bridge in the event that a new owner required the ship's removal from the dock (this was denied by North East Lincolnshire County Council who provided proof that for insurance reasons the bridge was opened every five years to ensure it worked).

Without a further survey carried out it was not certain if the sunken derelict in the dock opposite the paddle steamer constituted an obstruction or not in the event the ship was moved, but it appeared as if it would block her from turning during dismantling as access by crane to both sides of the ship was required.

Actually getting the ship out would have required getting at least one mobile crane to the dock side, and permission (and supervision) from both the council and the adjacent supermarket. Her sponsons would have had to be un-bolted and separated from both sides to allow her to clear the narrow Corporation Bridge, and her funnel and wheelhouse would have to be lowered for her to pass under the Westgate Road Bridge.

Controversy surrounded the move by which the owner placed the ship for sale and then seemingly sought to re-buff any inquiries; claims were made by the interested parties in news-letters and websites that negotiations with both the owner and with North East Lincolnshire Council were foundering as repeated requests for information and assistance with any of the above issues went un-answered. Increasingly large sums were offered and refused over the summer of 2010, and a demolition firm engaged to break the ship for scrap.

Despite a public outcry, 2010 photographs in the Grimsby Telegraph revealed how it was being reduced to a shadow of its former self. Demolition contractors could be seen tearing out the inside of the vessel at its berth in Alexandra Dock, Grimsby. The representatives of the owner had stated that they had completely ruled out any chance of transferring the vessel to the Hull-based Lincoln Castle Preservation Society. They cited the cost of dismantling the vessel, dredging the channel in order to move it seaward, and the cost of restoration as the prime reasons for refusing to sell. The statement amounted to saying 'You'll thank us for it one day,' and served to enrage onlookers as well as those with a vested interest in preserving the ship.

Myra Allen of PSPS stated in Paddle Wheels that; 'Even at one point when it seemed a sale of the ship was going ahead, the owner insisted that the bottom plates of the ship could not be sold, which of course makes a rescue attempt for the complete vessel impossible. The whole episode has been a heartbreaking one. Although demolition work had started some months ago, there were several buyers for the engine and other machinery, including a museum that had cleared a space to take the items, and we were actively involved in facilitating this. However destruction continued in spite of those interested parties, almost, it seemed, in haste.' The statement seemed to suggest that the ship's owner was the reason the ship could not be saved.

Despite protests and offers by LCPS to buy the ship at prices well in excess of the original asking price the scrapping of the ship was concluded by October 2010. The website for the Foundation for Paddlesteamers Worldwide (Paddlesteamer Resources by Tramscape) placed the end of the demolition as being mid-October, and expressed surprise at the turn of events, stating ‘...it is clear that the owner never entered into any serious negotiations, especially with LCPS who had developed a plan for her removal, storage and restoration. There would appear to be more to this matter than meets the eye and the full story has yet to emerge.'

The anchor and chain from the vessel were donated by Grimsby's Tony Booth to local conservation group the Friends of the Freshney in memory of his late father Dick Booth who worked most of his life for British Railways and they have already been installed in the nearby Duke of York Gardens as part of a floral display. Funding has been granted from the John Ross Foundation towards this project, which includes a plaque giving details of the historic vessel as well as bollards from the ship itself.

The demolition of the vessel has served to highlight the plight of many similar preserved craft that have been placed in 'ship in a bottle' locations with limited maintenance options. Concerns have since been raised about the ultimate fate of the Ross Tiger, itself still afloat in Alexandra Dock. However the plan is for the vessel to be enclosed as part of developments at the adjacent Fishing Heritage Centre.

== Restoration bid ==
On 31 March 2011, the Lincoln Castle Preservation Society launched a bid to buy the ship's parts from scrap and rebuild the vessel as a tourist attraction. As the vessel was dismantled by heavy machinery, the salvaged parts would be fitted on a newly constructed steel hull.

== Sources ==
- Lincolnshire Railways Gallery
- The Heritage Trail
- River Humber Ferries
- Tramscape
- Grimsby Guide
