= New Holland railway station =

Railway station in Lincolnshire, England

New Holland
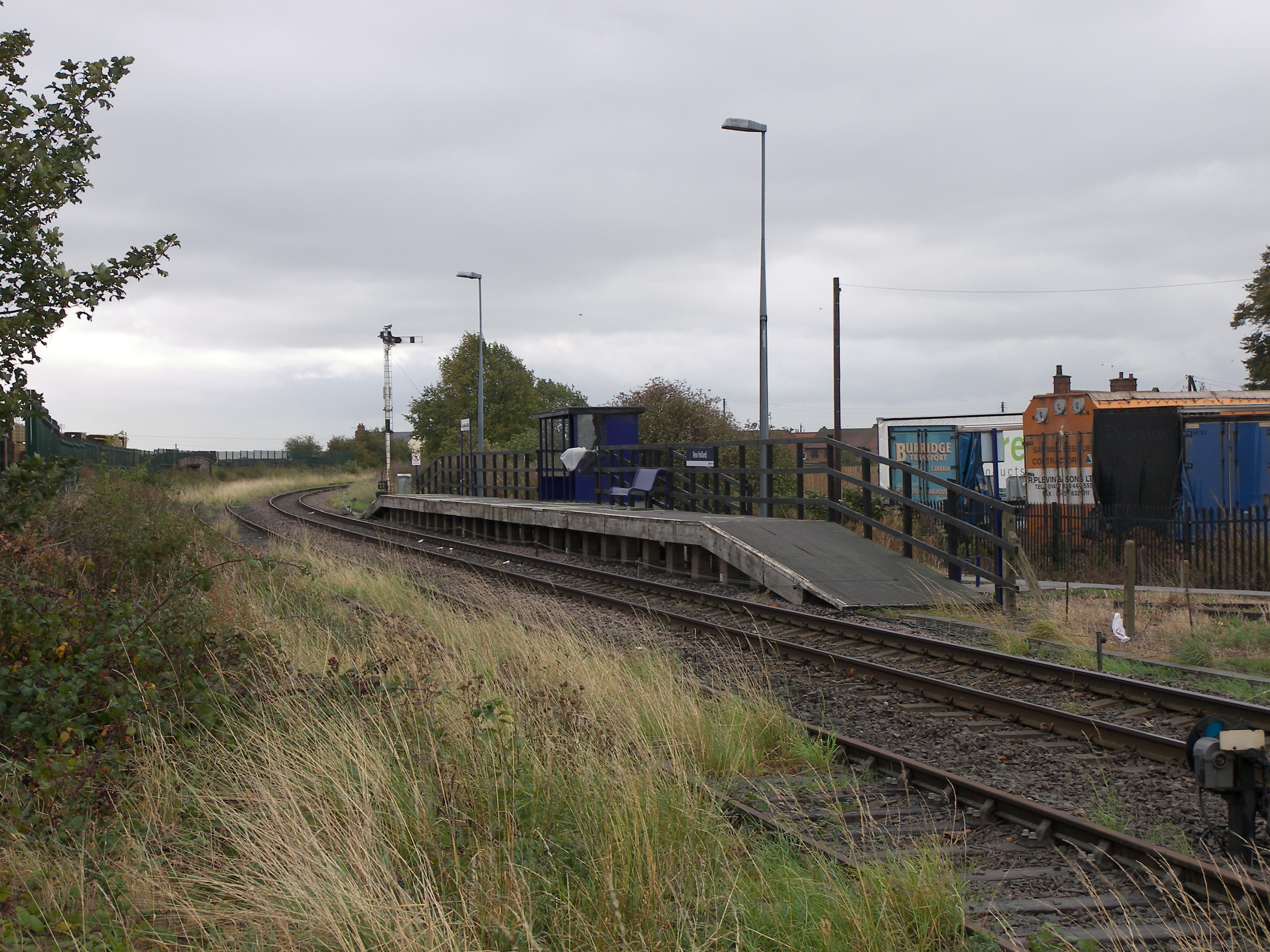

General information
- Location: New Holland, North Lincolnshire; England
- Coordinates: 53.702°N 0.360°W
- Grid reference: TA083240
- Manager: East Midlands Railway
- Platforms: 1

Other information
- Station code: NHL
- Classification: DfT category F1

History
- Opened: 24 June 1981

Passengers
- 2021/22: ▲6,468
- 2022/23: ▲8,550
- 2023/24: ▲10,576
- 2024/25: ▼10,354
- 2025/26: ▼9,466
Location
Notes
- Passenger statistics from the Office of Rail and Road

New Holland railway station is a single-platform station which serves the village of New Holland in North Lincolnshire, England. The station is situated on the Barton line 19 miles (31 km) west of Cleethorpes, and all trains serving it are operated by East Midlands Railway.

== History ==
The original station, named New Holland Town, was built by the Manchester, Sheffield and Lincolnshire Railway (MS&LR) and was situated a few yards towards the Humber Estuary at the landward end of New Holland Pier, a jetty, some 1,500 feet (460 m) in length which served a ferry service to Hull. At the pier head was situated New Holland Pier railway station. As one of the early aims of the MS&LR was to reach Hull the pierhead at New Holland became its "Up" terminus. This was later changed to Grimsby on completion of the "London Extension" to Marylebone.

Because of these early aims the railway company bought out the rights of the New Holland Ferry. These rights transferred to the Great Central Railway, the London & North Eastern Railway and, on nationalisation, British Railways. The ferry service was closed on the opening of the Humber Bridge in June 1981 and the New Holland Pier railway station closed. The present day railway station at New Holland opened to serve the community, replacing the original which closed on the same day.

New Holland was a railway community, the majority of the housing being built by the company to house its workers. It played an important part in railway life for it was here that the railway company laundry was situated and special laundry vans brought the soiled washing from the company's stations, restaurant cars and hotels. Also centred here were the company's wagon sheet repair shops, skills used in the repair of sails could be put to a railway use.

Yarborough Hotel was rebuilt (replacing a hotel bought in 1845) in 1851 for MS&LR. It was included in adverts for LNER hotels in 1936, but was sold before nationalisation, being advertised for sale in 1947.

== Facilities ==
The station is unstaffed and has limited amenities (just a waiting shelter, bench seat and timetable poster board on the single wood platform). Tickets have to be purchased in advance or on the train. Level access is available between the station entrance and platform.

== Services ==
All services at New Holland are operated by East Midlands Railway using Class 170 DMUs.

The typical off-peak service is one train every two hours in each direction between Cleethorpes and Barton-on-Humber.

On Sundays, the station is served by four trains per day in each direction during the summer months only. No services call at the station on Sundays during the winter months.

Preceding station	National Rail	Following station
Barrow Haven	East Midlands Railway Barton Line	Goxhill
