= Hull station =

Hull station may refer to:

- Hull Paragon Interchange (opened 1847)
- Hull Cannon Street railway station (1885–1968)
- Hull Street Station (1901–Bef. 1995)
- Hull Victoria Dock railway station (1853–1864)
- Hull Victoria Pier railway station (1849–1981)
