= The Lincoln Castle Hotel =

English hotel

Coordinates: 53.701339°N 0.36044811°W

- Location in Lincolnshire

General information
- Location: New Holland, Lincolnshire, England
- Opening: 1851

Design and construction
- Architect: William Kirk of Lincoln

The Lincoln Castle Hotel is a hotel and grade II listed building in New Holland, Lincolnshire. Built by William Kirk of Lincoln for the Manchester, Sheffield and Lincolnshire Railway, the hotel was opened in 1851 as the "Yarborough Arms". It was one of the first buildings built in the village.

It shares its name with one of the ships that operated the Humber Ferry service from New Holland to Hull: the PS Lincoln Castle, which operated this service from 1948 to 1971.
