= Museum of Hartlepool =

Coordinates: 54.690°N 1.207°W

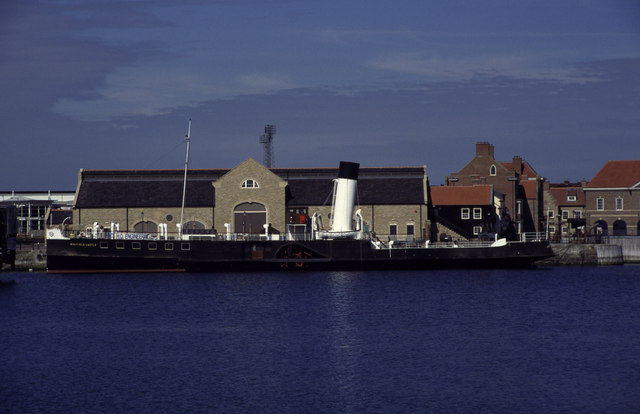
The Museum of Hartlepool with PS Wingfield in the foreground

The Museum of Hartlepool opened in 1996 and is located within the attraction Hartlepool's Maritime Experience. It houses the collections once on display in the Gray Art Gallery and Museum and the Maritime Museum which was on the Headland, Hartlepool, both are now closed. The fine art collections are displayed at Hartlepool Art Gallery. It is free to enter and houses hundreds of exhibits telling the story of Hartlepool, England, a North East coastal town with a rich heritage in shipbuilding, fishing and the sea.

The largest exhibit is the Paddle Steam Ship PS Wingfield Castle. Built in 1934, for many years it served as a passenger ferry across the Humber. It was restored in Hartlepool and now is a floating exhibit and houses a coffee shop. Other exhibits include the first gas illuminated lighthouse, a 'sea monster' or merman, a real coble boat to climb upon. You can also find out about the famous Monkey Legend, and why Hartlepudlians are often referred to as a Monkey hanger. There is a temporary exhibition area in the museum which displays local, regional and national exhibitions.
