= Hull Victoria Pier railway station =

Manchester, Sheffield and Lincolnshire Railway's booking office for their ferry service

Hull Victoria Pier
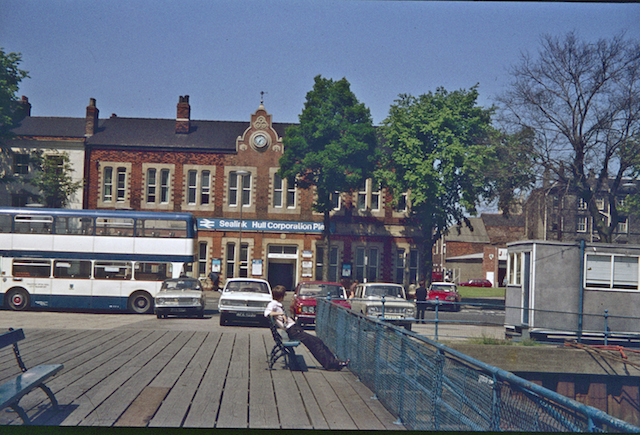
- July 1978

General information
- Location: Victoria Pier, Kingston upon Hull, City of Kingston upon Hull; England
- Coordinates: 53.7384°N 0.3341°W
- Grid reference: TA100281
- Platforms: 0

Other information
- Status: Disused

History
- Original company: Manchester, Sheffield and Lincolnshire Railway
- Pre-grouping: Great Central Railway
- Post-grouping: London and North Eastern Railway

Key dates
- c. 1849: Opened as Hull Corporation Pier
- 15 October 1854: Renamed Hull Victoria Pier
- 25 June 1981: Closed
Location

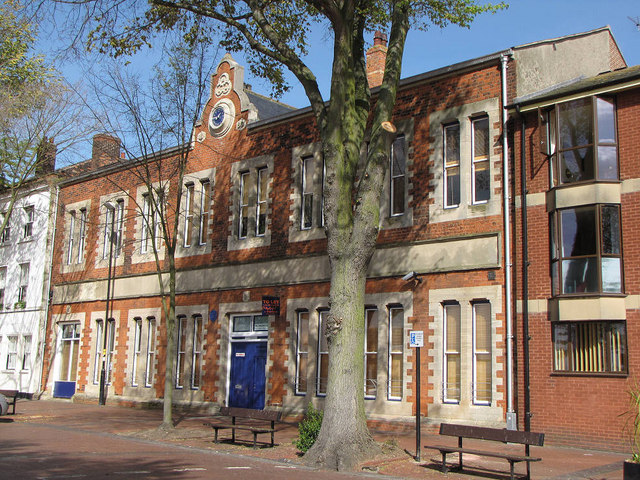
The former booking office today

Corporation Pier station was the Manchester, Sheffield and Lincolnshire Railway's booking office for their ferry service between Corporation Pier, Hull and New Holland Pier in Lincolnshire. It was not rail connected, but served as a ticket office and waiting room for the Humber Ferry.

After a visit by Queen Victoria in 1854 the station and pier were renamed Victoria Pier station in her honour. The name may have stuck to the pier, but it never did to the station. The building itself, and references to it on maps and tickets referred to "Corporation Pier" until closure 117 years later. The station closed in 1985 with the end of the Humber ferry service.

== History ==
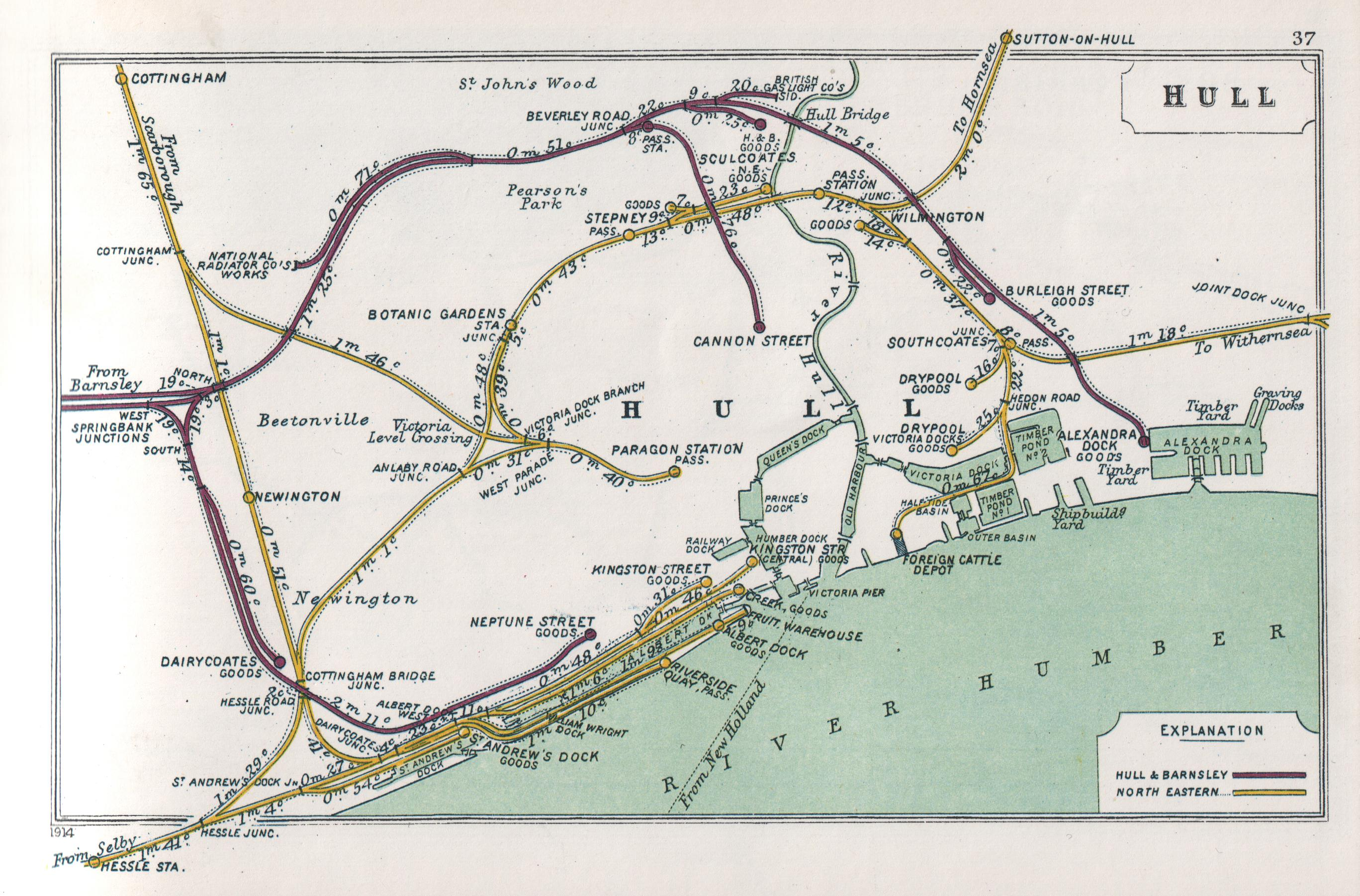
A 1914 Railway Clearing House Junction Diagram showing railways and docks in Hull, including Victoria Pier (lower centre)

The Manchester, Sheffield and Lincolnshire Railway (MS&LR) opened their line from Grimsby to New Holland Pier on 1 March 1848, and from the outset this ran in conjunction with a ferry service between New Holland and the port of Hull. The MS&LR operated their own fleet of steamships for the service.

The first MS&LR offices in Hull, at Walkington's Lodgings, were purchased in January 1849 for £850. The company's offices were moved in August that year to 7 Nelson Street, a building which also contained the living quarters for the clerk in charge. These offices expanded into the adjacent building in May 1854.

The Great Grimsby and Sheffield Junction Railway, one of several companies which amalgamated in 1847 to form the MS&LR, had obtained powers on 26 June 1846 to establish proper pier facilities at Hull. These eventually lapsed without being used, and in the absence of quays which could be used at low tide, passengers were conveyed between ships at anchor and the shore in small boats. Soon after April 1856, Edward Watkin, the MS&LR General Manager, offered the Mayor of Hull £40 per annum towards the maintenance of the Corporation Pier, Kingston upon Hull in return for the use of that pier. This was then used, not just for the New Holland ferry service, but also for services to Barrow Haven and Barton-upon-Humber.

On 13–14 October 1854, Queen Victoria visited Hull, and on the morning of 14 October sailed for Grimsby from Hull Corporation Pier, which the following day was renamed Hull Victoria Pier.

The offices at Victoria Pier closed on 25 June 1981, with the withdrawal of the ferry service following the opening of the Humber Bridge.

Preceding station	Historical railways	Following station
Terminus	Sealink; Humber Ferry	New Holland Pier

== See also ==
- PS Lincoln Castle, PS Tattershall Castle, PS Wingfield Castle : former Humber ferries
- Dartmouth railway station
