= Humber Bridge (Debts) Act 1996 =

Act of the Parliament of the United Kingdom

Humber Bridge (Debts) Act 1996 (Note: Section 2.)
- Act of Parliament
- Parliament of the United Kingdom
- Long title: An Act to confer power on the Secretary of State to provide that sums payable to him by the Humber Bridge Board shall not be so payable.
- Citation: 1996 c. 1
- Territorial extent: United Kingdom

Dates
- Royal assent: 29 February 1996
- Commencement: 29 February 1996 (Note: Section 4(b) of the Interpretation Act 1978.)
Other legislation
Relates to	Humber Bridge Act 1971

Status: Current legislation

Text of statute as originally enacted

Revised text of statute as amended

Text of the Humber Bridge (Debts) Act 1996 as in force today (including any amendments) within the United Kingdom, from legislation.gov.uk.

The Humber Bridge (Debts) Act 1996 (c. 1) is an act of the Parliament of the United Kingdom. The purpose of the act was to give power to the Secretary of State for Transport to write off debts payable to the British Government by the Humber Bridge Board, operators of the Humber Bridge. The act was necessary as the board had accumulated debts of £439 million by 1997. The act allowed the Secretary of State to pass orders to reorganise the board's debts, and write off sufficient amount of debt to allow the board to continue to maintain the Humber Bridge, a vital transport link for Humberside. This reduced the amount of debt to £333 million soon afterwards and resulted in calls for all tolls across the bridge to be abolished.

== Provisions ==
Section 1(1) of the act empowers the Secretary of State to provide by order that any sum (including interest) which would otherwise be payable to the Secretary of State by the Humber Bridge Board, in accordance with an agreement under section 5(3) of the Humber Bridge Act 1971, and which is specified in the order, is not payable. No order may be made without the consent of the Treasury (section 1(2)), and the power is exercisable by statutory instrument subject to annulment in pursuance of a resolution of the House of Commons (section 1(3)). Section 2 provides the short title.

== Orders ==
Four orders have been made under the act. The first and last waived principal as well as interest; the others reduced the rate of interest payable on the board's debt for a fixed period.

- Humber Bridge (Debts) Order 1998 (SI 1998/1797), in force on 19 August 1998, waived £63,073,470 of principal and £17,329,085.08 of related interest, and released interest on specified, declining balances of the remaining debt for each year from 1998 to 2013.
- Humber Bridge (Debts) Order 2007 (SI 2007/1828), in force on 18 July 2007, waived interest accruing from 1 April 2006 to 31 March 2011 to the extent that it exceeded rates falling from 7.27 per cent to 5.49 per cent.
- Humber Bridge (Debts) Order 2011 (SI 2011/1718), in force on 9 August 2011, waived interest accruing from 1 April 2011 to 31 March 2016 to the extent that it exceeded rates falling from 5.13 per cent to 4.25 per cent.
- Humber Bridge (Debts) Order 2012 (SI 2012/716), in force on 31 March 2012, waived £150 million of principal (£38,789,000 and £111,211,000) and interest accruing from 1 April 2012 to the extent that it exceeded 4.25 per cent per annum. It revoked the 2011 order.
