= New Holland engine shed =

New Holland
- Interactive map of New Holland

Location
- Location: New Holland, North East Lincolnshire, England
- Coordinates: 53.7023°N 0.3629°W
- OS grid: TA 081 241

Characteristics
- Owner: Closed
- Type: Steam

History
- Opened: 1 March 1848
- Closed: 20 April 1941
- Original: Manchester, Sheffield and Lincolnshire Railway
- Pre-grouping: Great Central Railway
- Post-grouping: LNER

New Holland engine shed was a small railway locomotive maintenance depot located southwest of the triangle of lines south of New Holland Town station in North East Lincolnshire, England.

== History ==
New Holland was a "railway village" in the sense that Crewe was a railway town. It was regarded as the railway's eastern terminus until 1887 when this status passed to the hugely enlarged Port of Grimsby. Expanding the dock, building the engine shed, the pier and the railway to it were promoted and started by the Great Grimsby and Sheffield Junction Railway, though by the time the shed opened in 1847 then services began in 1848 that railway had merged with others to form the Manchester, Sheffield and Lincolnshire Railway.

As built, the shed had four through "roads" (tracks) each with an individual entrance, all under a double-pitched section roof. It had facilities to provide maintenance, coal and water, which was stored in a reservoir in the triangle between the running lines. The shed's fortunes followed the line, by 1886 it had been reduced to providing motive power for four passenger trains, three of which were local, local shunting and trip working and a handful of goods trains. This level of activity continued well into the 20th Century. New Holland's local services all ran along very level lines, which provided gentle semi-retirement for ancient locomotives and rolling stock, such as ex-MS&LR 2-4-0s and non-corridor clerestory coaches. The writing was on the wall for New Holland shed from 1912 when Immingham Dock and engine shed opened. It soldiered on as an independent entity until 1941 when it became a sub-shed of Immingham, which it remained until at least 1963.

The building was progressively reduced over the years. In 1932 it appeared complete but by 1938 the wooden coaling stage had disappeared and the two northern shed entrances had been knocked into one, by 1960 the roof had gone, but their two supporting walls remained, these, in turn had been demolished by July 1961.

A locomotive type particularly associated with the shed in later years was the LNER Class Y3.

By 2015 the shed had been demolished and the site built over for industrial use.

== See also ==
- List of British Railways shed codes
