= New Holland, Lincolnshire =

Village, civil parish and port on the Humber estuary in North Lincolnshire, England

Coordinates: 53.70°N 0.36°W

New Holland
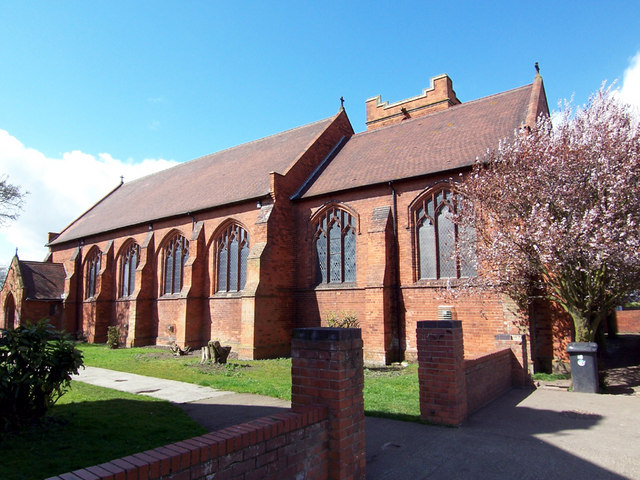
- Christ Church, New Holland

- Location within Lincolnshire
- Population: 970 (2011 census)
- OS grid reference: TA083238
  - London: 155 mi (249 km) S
- Unitary authority: North Lincolnshire
- Ceremonial county: Lincolnshire
- Region: Yorkshire and the Humber
- Country: England
- Sovereign state: United Kingdom
- Post town: BARROW-UPON-HUMBER
- Postcode district: DN19
- Police: Humberside
- Fire: Humberside
- Ambulance: East Midlands

New Holland is a village, civil parish and port on the Humber estuary in North Lincolnshire, England. In 2001 it had a population of 955, increasing marginally to 970 at the 2011 census.

== History ==
New Holland was established in the early 19th century. It was initially the site of a small ferry site, but this grew in size over the early decades of the century. The Manchester, Sheffield and Lincolnshire Railway company established the Lincoln Castle Hotel (then as the "Yarborough Arms") and the terraced houses in Manchester Square.

In 1870-1872 John Marius Wilson described the village in his Imperial Gazetteer of England and Wales:

HOLLAND (NEW), a sea port village in Barrow-upon-Humber parish, Lincoln; on the river Humber, and on the Grimsby and Sheffield Junction railway, opposite Hull, 4 miles E by N of Barton-upon-Humber. It has a station on the railway, a post office under Hull, a steamferry to Hull, a coast guard station, a national school, and a Wesleyan chapel; and the school-room is used as a chapel of ease. The pop[ulation] in 1851, was 401, and was then rapidly increasing.

New Holland is the former embarkation point for the London & North Eastern Railway's ferry service to Victoria Pier, Kingston upon Hull. The service was operational from 1820 to 1981, when the Humber Bridge opened. There were three LNER built paddle steamers used on the route: the PS Tattershall Castle, now a London pub and restaurant moored at the Embankment, the Lincoln Castle which served a similar purpose at Grimsby until 2006, and has since been scrapped, and the PS Wingfield Castle, which returned to Hartlepool where it was built, and where it is now a museum ship.

== Port ==
The port of New Holland handles mostly bulk cargo in two locations: first, the small tidal dock, built about 1848 with the coming of the railway, and second, New Holland Pier, the former terminal for the ferry to Hull.

The tidal dock is almost entirely used for the import of timber from Scandinavia, Russia and the Baltic states, particularly the ports of Hamina (Finland), Kalmar (Sweden), St.Petersburg (Russia), Tallinn (Estonia) and Riga (Latvia). Occasional imports of steel products come from the near continent. The tidal dock generally only accommodates one vessel at a time.

New Holland Pier, with berths for three ships, is capable of accommodating larger vessels through its location in the deeper part of the channel. Since the early 1980s it has been used for the import and export of bulk cargo between the UK and parts of Scandinavia and Europe, the Black Sea and North Africa.

The village and port is served by New Holland railway station, which opened in 1981, replacing separate stations at New Holland Pier and New Holland Town which both opened in 1848.
