= New Holland Pier railway station =

Former railway station in Lincolnshire, England

New Holland Pier
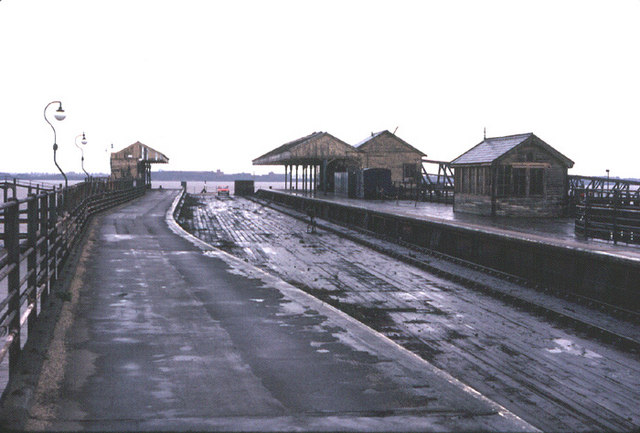
- The station on New Holland Pier in March 1981. The ferry service was due to cease operating on 24 June 1981 when the Humber Bridge opened.

General information
- Location: New Holland, Lincolnshire; England
- Coordinates: 53.7086°N 0.3662°W
- Grid reference: TA079347
- Platforms: 2

Other information
- Status: Disused

History
- Original company: Great Grimsby and Sheffield Junction Railway
- Pre-grouping: Great Central Railway
- Post-grouping: LNER

Key dates
- 1 March 1848: opened
- 24 June 1981: closed
Location

New Holland Pier railway station is a former railway terminus in North Lincolnshire, England. It stood at the seaward end of the New Holland Pier, which juts 1,375 feet (419 m) northwards into the Humber estuary at the village of New Holland. Its purpose was to enable railway passengers, vehicles and goods to transfer to and from ferries plying between New Holland and Hull.

New Holland was a "railway village" in the sense that Crewe was a railway town. Expanding the dock, building the pier, the engine shed and the railway to it were promoted and started by the Great Grimsby and Sheffield Junction Railway, though by the time services began that railway had merged with others to form the Manchester, Sheffield and Lincolnshire Railway. For many years GCR laundry from restaurant cars and hotels was brought to New Holland for cleaning.

== History ==
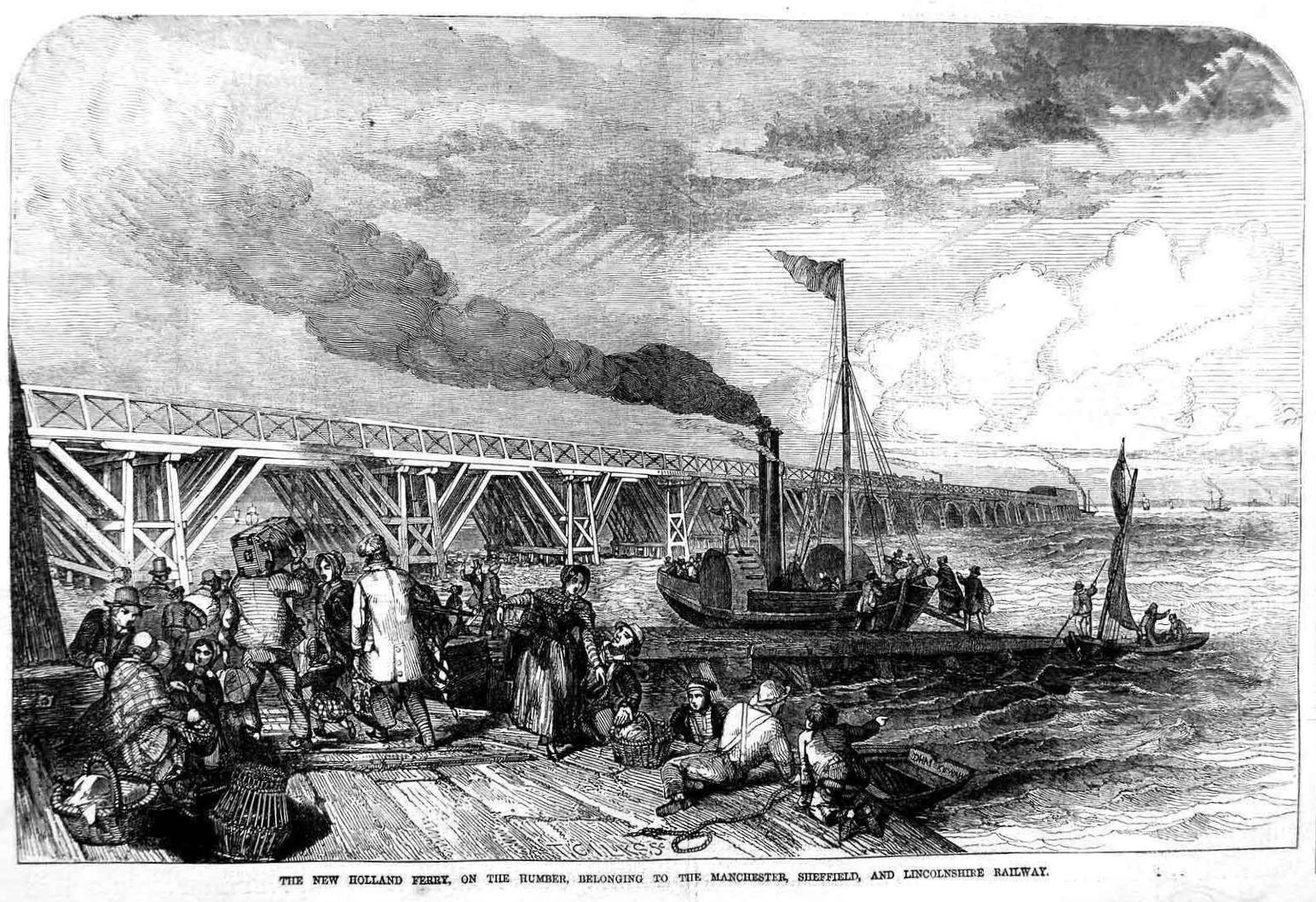
New holland pier and ferry

The station opened on 1 March 1848 following a Directors' tour of the ferry and route as far as Louth the day before.

Services in the early days were a mix of local and long distance. The line was seen as the gateway to Hull, with transshipment of people and goods being a mere inconvenience. Before long lines reached Hull via Doncaster, so passengers and railways alike realised that longer could be quicker and more convenient. After this the pier and railway eventually settled down to providing local services across the Humber.

These were:

Ferry from Hull to New Holland Pier then train:

- to Barton-on-Humber
- to Cleethorpes via Grimsby,

and, from 1911

- to Immingham Dock

The Immingham service ceased in 1963, but the other two survived until 1981.

A severe storm on 18–19 October 1869 damaged the pontoon at the end of the pier so badly that it sank.

On Sunday 13 January 1895 the pier and station at New Holland were destroyed by fire. It was later rebuilt.

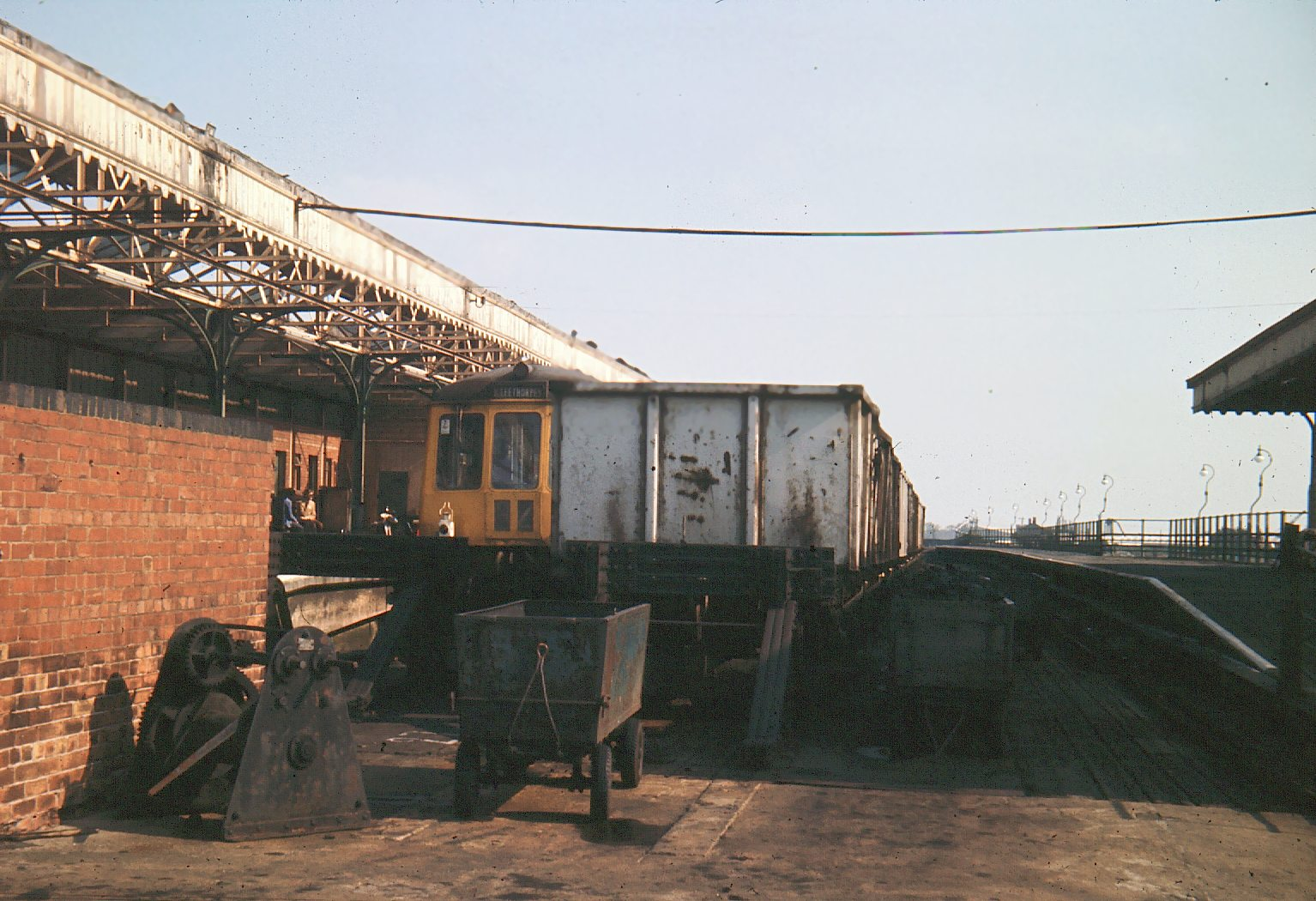
New Holland Pier station, May 1976, with coal supplies for the Humber ferry in the foreground

From 1923 the pier and station were closed for reconstruction, reopening on 19 March 1928. The station had two platforms with a siding between, the western platform doubling up as a wooden roadway used by vehicles coming to and from ferries. Foot passengers from the ferry and passenger trains most often used the platform on the eastern side of the pier. The central siding often contained one or two coal wagons from which a small road 'train' of tubs was loaded and taken down the access ramps to ferry steamers. Originally the station had an overall roof but this was later removed. The station buildings were made of wood and included a signal box and refreshment rooms on the more substantial eastern side.

Average annual traffic using the pier in its peak years was 30,000 passengers, 250 vehicles, 1200 cattle and sheep and 300 tons of luggage. Until the end of the Second World War, railway publicity, tickets and timetables rarely differentiated between the Town and Pier stations, with the July 1922 Bradshaw, for example, giving a single entry for "New Holland."

The station was closed and the ferry withdrawn on 24 June 1981 when the Humber Bridge opened. New Holland pier was taken over by New Holland Bulk Services who started a grain and feed import and export business in 1984.

When the station and the nearby New Holland Town station were closed they were replaced by a new station called New Holland, south of the latter. This is on the Barton Line which runs between Barton-on-Humber and Cleethorpes.

== Route ==
Preceding station	Disused railways	Following station
New Holland Town; Line and station closed	Great Central Railway; Great Grimsby and Sheffield Junction Railway	Terminus
	Historical railways	
Terminus	Sealink; Humber Ferry	Hull Corporation Pier; Ferry and station closed
