= Barrow Haven railway station =

Railway station in North Lincolnshire, England

Barrow Haven
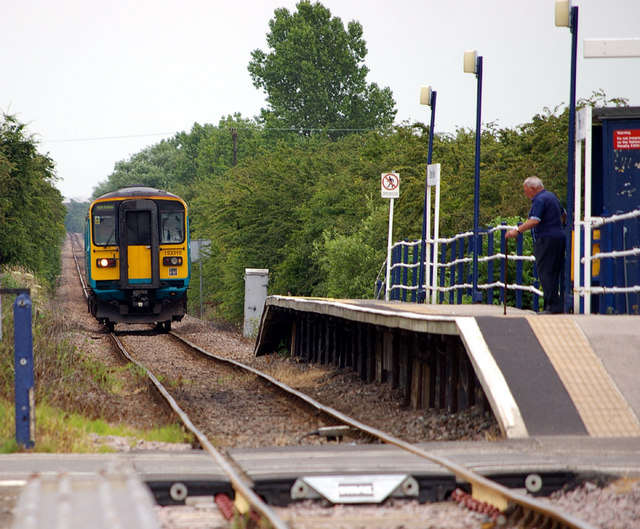

General information
- Location: Barrow Haven, North Lincolnshire; England
- Coordinates: 53.697426°N 0.392933°W
- Grid reference: TA062235
- Manager: East Midlands Railway
- Platforms: 1

Other information
- Station code: BAV
- Classification: DfT category F2

History
- Opened: 1 March 1849

Passengers
- 2021/22: ▲790
- 2022/23: ▼478
- 2023/24: ▲1,236
- 2024/25: ▼1,194
- 2025/26: ▲1,488
Location
Notes
- Passenger statistics from the Office of Rail and Road

Barrow Haven railway station serves the village of Barrow Haven in North Lincolnshire, England. The station has a single platform on the single-track line, with a shelter and a telephone on the platform. Stopping services from Barton-on-Humber to Cleethorpes call at the station. All services are provided by East Midlands Railway who operate the station.

== History ==
The station was opened as part of the branch line from New Holland to Barton-on-Humber in 1849.

== Facilities ==
On 8 May 2022, the station closed to allow the single platform to be replaced in a £1.3 million project. It was expected to reopen in October. The station reopened a month later in November. Following this, the station now has a modern waiting shelter, cycle racks and a solar-powered help point. As there are no facilities to purchase tickets, passengers must buy one in advance, or from the guard on the train.

== Services ==
All services at Barrow Haven are operated by East Midlands Railway using Class 170 DMUs.

The typical off-peak service is one train every two hours in each direction between Cleethorpes and Barton-on-Humber.

On Sundays, the station is served by four trains per day in each direction during the summer months only. No services call at the station on Sundays during the winter months.

| Preceding station | National Rail | Following station |
|---|---|---|
| Barton-on-Humber | East Midlands Railway Barton Line | New Holland |
Historical railways
| Barton-on-Humber Line and station open | Great Central Railway Barton Line | New Holland Town Line and station closed |
