= Royal Navy Museums, Hartlepool =

Maritime museum in Hartlepool, England

Coordinates: 54°41′25″N 1°12′28″W

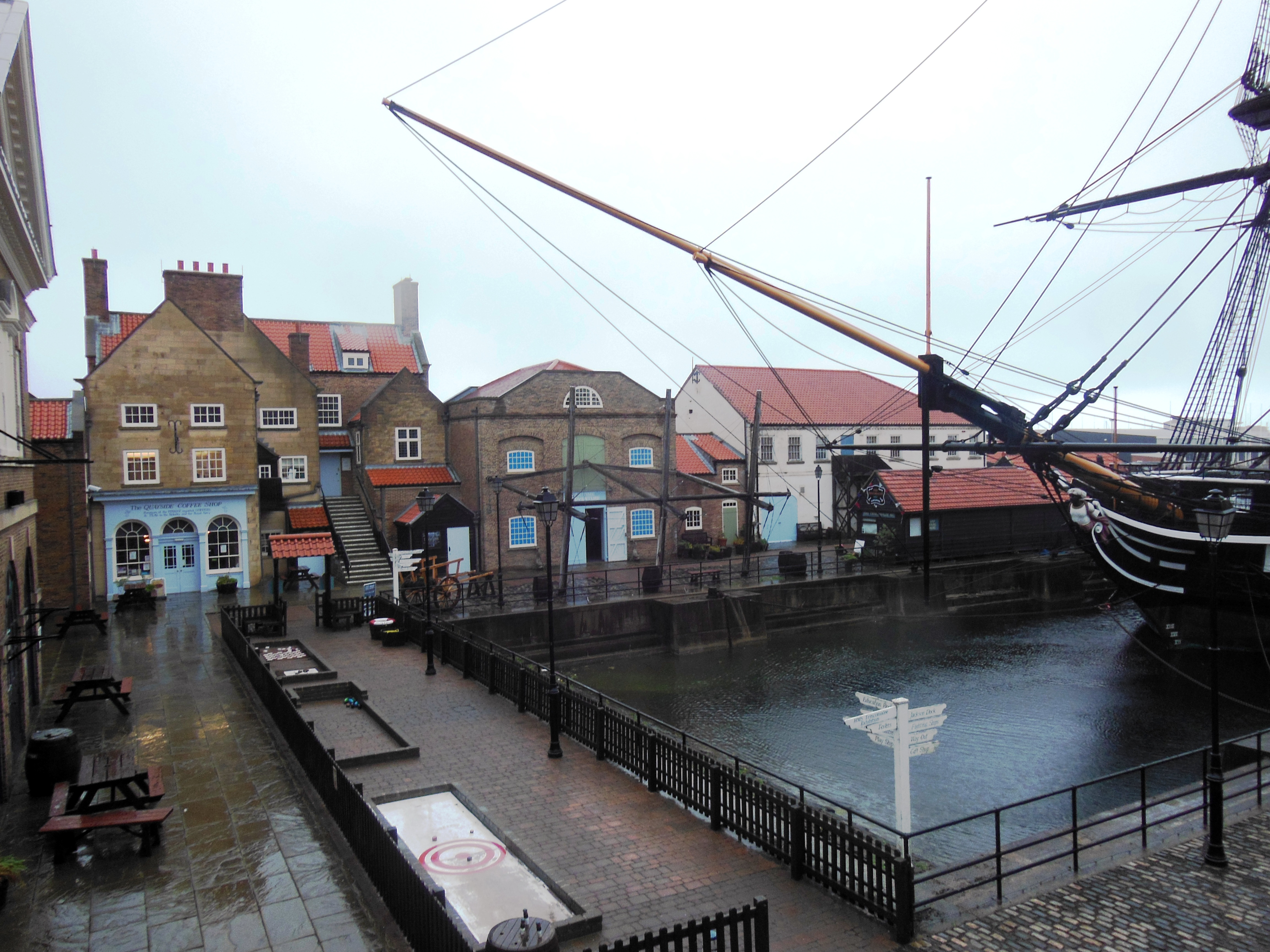
Hartlepool Historic Quay

Royal Navy Museums, Hartlepool is a maritime exposition and visitor attraction at the west end of Hartlepool Marina in Hartlepool, County Durham, Northern England. The concept of the attraction is the thematic re-creation of an 18th-century seaport, in the time of Lord Nelson, Napoleon and the Battle of Trafalgar. HMS Trincomalee, a Royal Navy frigate and Britain's oldest warship afloat is at the centre of the quay. She was built in Bombay, India in 1817. The 190th anniversary of the ship's official launch was on Friday 12 October 2007.

The attraction consists of gift shop and reception, Marine Barracks and Guard Room, a number of period shops and houses, Fighting Ships, Pressganged, Sir William Gray Suite and Baltic Rooms, Skittle Square and children's playship, Bistro and Quayside Coffee Shop, Children's Maritime Adventure Centre, HMS Trincomalee, PS Wingfield Castle and the Museum of Hartlepool.

== History ==
It opened to the public in July 1994. Before April 2005 it was known as Hartlepool Historic Quay. The museum was built by Teesside Development Corporation as part of the economic regeneration of old industrial sites of Cleveland, on the derelict docks that were formerly used for industries such as shipbuilding and as timber yards etc.

Between 2005 and 2016 it was known as Hartlepool's Maritime Experience. In June 2016 operation of the site was taken over from the local council by the National Museum of the Royal Navy, and it was rebranded as NMRN Hartlepool. The site was rebranded as Royal Navy Museums, Hartlepool in May 2026.

The PS Wingfield Castle, preserved at the Museum of Hartlepool is a floating exhibit and cafe. There are hundreds of other exhibits in the museum charting the history of the town from prehistoric times right up to the present day. One of the most popular features is the description of the Hartlepool monkey legend. Others include a full size coble boat, a lighthouse, a shell from the Bombardment of Hartlepool and many ships' models and engine displays.

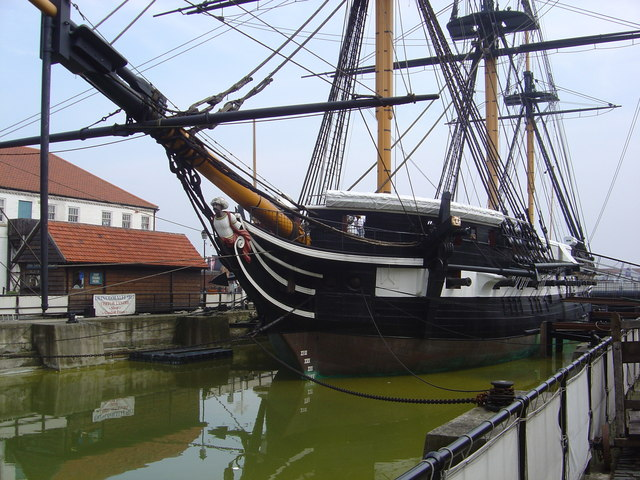
HMS Trincomalee.

The site saw improvements in 2006/2007 including a renewed Fighting Ships which is an audio/visual tour of a warship. There is now a new character which is Jim Henshaw, a young powder monkey. include an HMS Trincomalee Exhibition, Viewing Balcony overlooking HMS Trincomalee, upgrading and re-design of the Maritime Adventure Centre and the restoration of PS Wingfield Castle.
