= PS Wingfield Castle =

English museum ship

Coordinates: 54°41′23″N 1°12′21″W

- The PSS Wingfield Castle located Hartlepool's Maritime Experience in Hartlepool

History

United Kingdom
- Name: PSS Wingfield Castle
- Namesake: Wingfield Castle
- Owner: 1934-1947: LNER; 1948-1974: British Rail / Sealink; 1974-1982: EMI; 1982-1986: Whitbread plc; 1986-present: Hartlepool Borough Council
- Route: Humber Ferry crossing
- Ordered: 1934
- Builder: William Gray & Company, Hartlepool, England
- Laid down: 27 June 1934
- Commissioned: 24 September 1934
- Decommissioned: 1974
- Identification: IMO number: 5392018
- Status: Museum ship at Hartlepool's Maritime Experience

General characteristics
- Type: Paddlesteamer
- Tonnage: 556 GRT
- Length: 199.9 ft (60.9 m) LBP; 209 ft (64 m) LOA
- Beam: 33.1 ft (10.1 m) (main hull); 57 ft (17 m) (including paddle box)
- Propulsion: Triple expansion, diagonal stroke, reciprocating steam engine
- Speed: 12.0 knots (22.2 km/h; 13.8 mph)

The PS Wingfield Castle is a former Humber Estuary ferry, now preserved as a museum ship in Hartlepool, County Durham, England.

The Wingfield Castle was built by William Gray & Company at Hartlepool, and launched in 1934, along with a sister ship, the Tattershall Castle. A third similar vessel, the Lincoln Castle built in Glasgow, was launched in 1940.

She was earmarked to become a floating restaurant in Swansea Marina in the early 1980s but was too wide to fit through the lock gates. She is now preserved at the Museum of Hartlepool as a floating exhibit at Jackson Dock, as part of the Hartlepool's Maritime Experience visitor attraction, which also includes HMS Trincomalee.

In 2026 ship is closed for visitors, being in state of deteroration with uncertain plans of reconstruction due to huge costs.

== Pictures ==
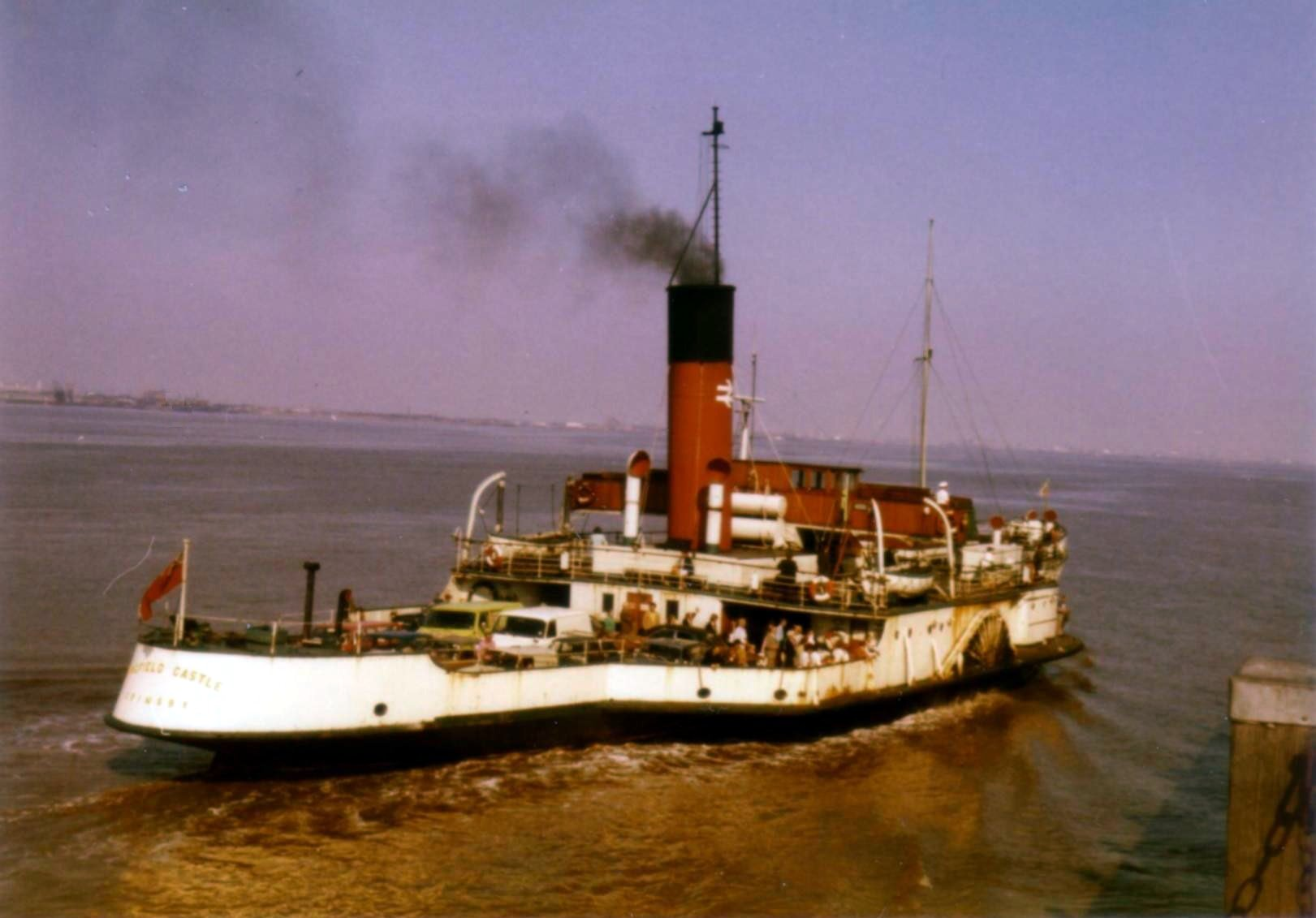
The Wingfield Castle in September 1973 on the Humber estuary

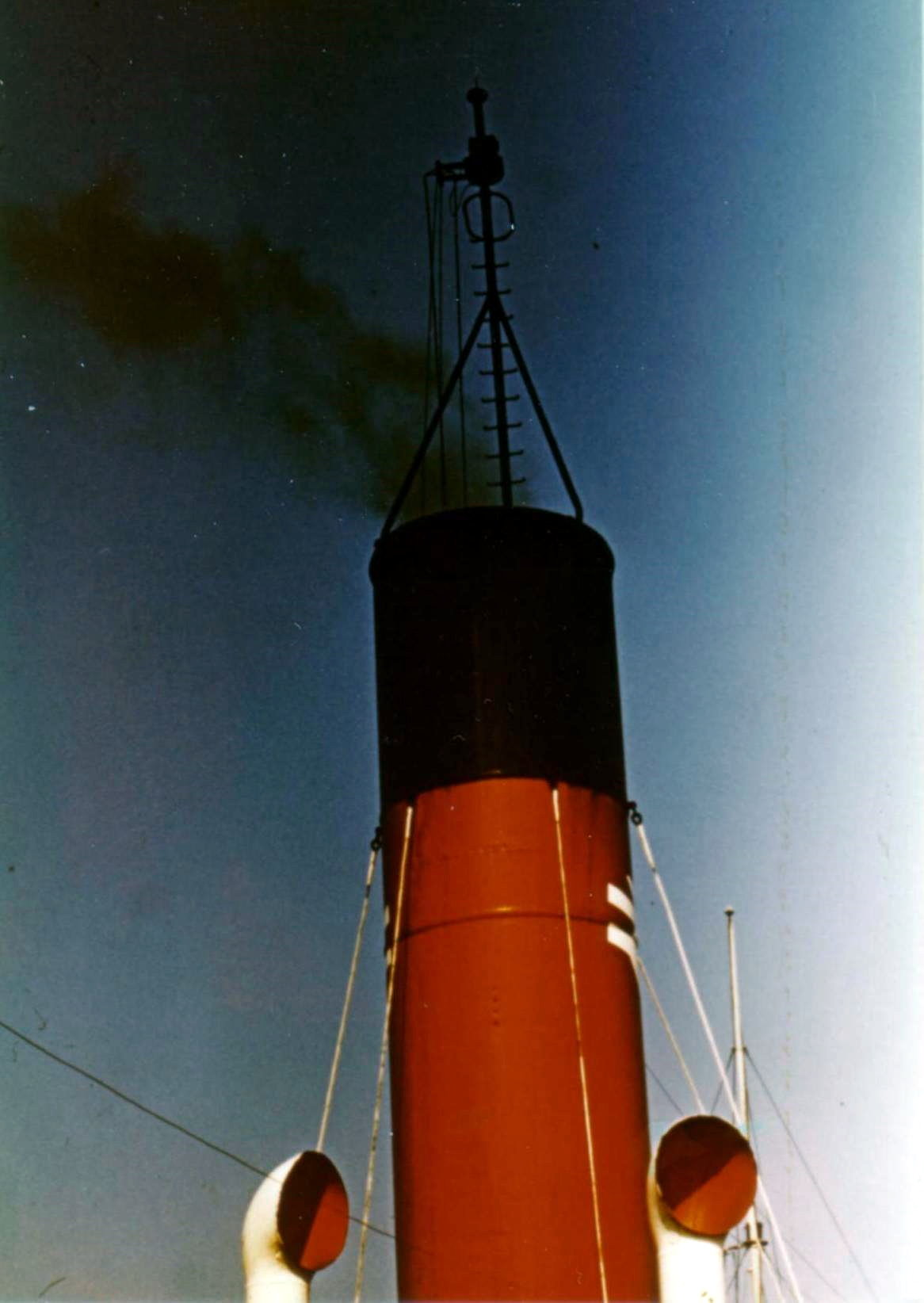
The Wingfield Castle funnel in September 1973

== See also ==
- PS Kingswear Castle
- PS Tattershall Castle
- PS Waverley
