= Humber Bridge =

Suspension bridge in England

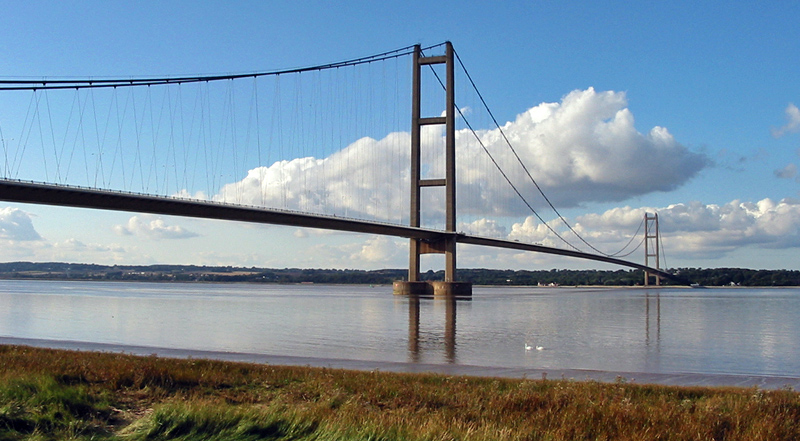
- The Humber Bridge, Lincolnshire/East Yorkshire
- Coordinates: 53.7064°N 0.4500°W
- Carries: 4 lanes of motor traffic (A15), pedestrian- cycle-way either side
- Crosses: Humber
- Locale: Hessle, East Riding of Yorkshire/North Lincolnshire
- Maintained by: The Humber Bridge Board
- Heritage status: Grade I listed

Characteristics
- Design: Suspension
- Total length: 7,280 ft; 1.38 mi (2,220 m)
- Width: 94 ft (28.5 m)
- Height: 510 ft (155.5 m)
- Longest span: 4,630 ft; 0.88 mi (1,410 m)

History
- Fabrication by: Cleveland Bridge & Engineering Company
- Construction cost: £98,000,000 £151,000,000 including interest at completion
- Opened: To traffic on 24 June 1981; Officially on 17 July 1981

Statistics
- Daily traffic: 33,000 vehicles
- Toll: Toll/Toll with an account: Motorbikes and Trikes: £0.00; 2 axle vehicles under 3.5 tonnes – cars, small vans and caravans: £2.00/£1.50; 2 axle vehicles between 3.5 -7 tonnes, 9-16 passenger mini bus, bus/coaches, agricultural vehicles: £5.00/£4.00; 3 axles or more, over 7.5 tonnes: £15.00/£12.00

Location
- Interactive map of Humber Bridge

The Humber Bridge is a 2.22-kilometre (2,430-yard; 7,300-foot; 1.38-mile) single-span road suspension bridge near Kingston upon Hull, East Riding of Yorkshire, England. When it opened to traffic on 24 June 1981, it was the longest of its type in the world; the Akashi Kaikyō Bridge surpassed it in 1998, and it became the fourteenth-longest by 2025.

The bridge spans the Humber (an estuary formed by the rivers Trent and Ouse), between Barton-upon-Humber on the south bank and Hessle on the north bank, connecting the East Riding of Yorkshire with North Lincolnshire. Both sides of the bridge were in the non-metropolitan county of Humberside until its dissolution in 1996. The bridge can be seen for miles around, from as far as Patrington in the East Riding of Yorkshire, and from out to sea miles off the coast. It is a Grade I listed building.

By 2006, the bridge carried an average of 120,000 vehicles per week. The toll was £3.00 each way for cars (higher for commercial vehicles), which made it the most expensive toll crossing in the United Kingdom. In April 2012, the toll was halved to £1.50 each way after the UK government deferred £150 million from the bridge's outstanding debt.

== History ==
Before the bridge, commuters crossed the Humber on the Humber Ferry from Corporation Pier at Hull and New Holland Pier at New Holland, Lincolnshire, or by road via the M62 (from 1976), M18 (from 1979) and M180 motorways, crossing, by way of the Ouse Bridge, the River Ouse near Goole (connected to the Humber). Until the mid-1970s the route south was via the single-carriageway A63 and the A614 (via grid-locked Thorne) where it met the busy A18 and crossed the Stainforth and Keadby Canal at Keadby Bridge, a swing bridge, which formed a bottleneck on the route, and on through Finningley and Bawtry, meeting the east–west A631.

The journey was along straight single-carriageway roads across foggy moors interrupted by bottlenecks for most of the journey to Blyth, Nottinghamshire, where it met the A1, and the accident rate was high. Debates in Parliament were held on the low standard of the route across the windswept plains around Goole. It was not unexpected that under these conditions, a Humber Bridge, with connecting dual-carriageway approach roads and grade-separated junctions, would seem worthwhile. By the time the bridge opened, much of this inferior route had been transformed by dualling of the A63 and its bypasses, extending the M62 and the connecting of the M18 from Thorne to Wadworth. The obvious need for a Humber Bridge had been reduced by the late 1970s with the improvements of the motorway infrastructure in the region. Although welcome, these improvements detracted from the need for vehicles to cross a bridge from Hessle to Barton. The Humber Bridge was a victim of the success of the M62 before it opened. A hovercraft service, Minerva and Mercury, linked Hull Pier and Grimsby Docks from February to October 1969 but suffered relatively frequent breakdowns.

=== Act of Parliament ===
Humber Bridge Act 1959
- Act of Parliament
- Parliament of the United Kingdom
- Long title: An Act to provide for the construction and maintenance of a bridge across the river Humber with approach roads and other works to constitute a Board and for other purposes.
- Citation: 7 & 8 Eliz. 2. c. xlvi

Dates
- Royal assent: 29 July 1959

Text of statute as originally enacted

Plans for a bridge were drawn up in the 1930s when a team of engineers compiled a report on whether to bridge or tunnel the estuary. It was decided that a bridge would cost £1,750,000 over a tunnel which was costed at £7,200,000.

Revised plans were unveiled in 1955, but work did not begin until 27 July 1972. The Humber Bridge Act 1959 (7 & 8 Eliz. 2. c. xlvi), was promoted by Kingston Upon Hull Corporation and established the Humber Bridge Board to manage and raise funds to build the bridge and buy the land required for the approach roads.

In early 1965 the transport plans for the region were mostly developed, to cost £50 million in total. This included what became the M18 around Doncaster, and a trunk road from Gilberdyke westwards, with a £5.5 million high-level bridge over the River Ouse, to meet the M62. The Humber Bridge was now planned to cost around £11.5 million. But in parliament on 22 September 1965, this east-west road system, and the north-south Doncaster bypass was given much higher priority than the Humber Bridge; construction on the region's transport was planned to start in the 1970s.

=== 1966 Kingston upon Hull North by-election ===
The allocation of funds proved impossible until the 1966 Kingston upon Hull North by-election. Labour Prime Minister Harold Wilson prevailed upon his Minister of Transport Barbara Castle to sanction the building of the bridge. Dismay at the long wait for a crossing led to Christopher Rowe writing a protest song, "The Humber Bridge".

In December 1965, the East Riding council disputed the government's plans, and wanted the proposed east-west route to end at Ledsham, not Ferrybridge.

Four weeks later at an evening meeting on Tuesday 18 January 1966 at Endike Lane Primary School, Barbara Castle agreed to a bridge. On the same day Mrs Castle, originally from Pontefract, had approved the £9 million Doncaster southern bypass. Three days later, in parliament, the shadow chancellor said that this was a pre-election bribe.

An important feasibility study report by the Central Unit of Environmental Planning, of the Department of Economic Affairs was published on 30 April 1969, which would provide enough evidence for the scheme to be funded. Shortly afterwards, on Thursday 1 May 1969 the Secretary of State for Economic Affairs, in parliament, announced that construction of the bridge would start in 1972, to be built by 1976. Seven days later the local council became Conservative, by 44 to 37 seats.

== Design ==
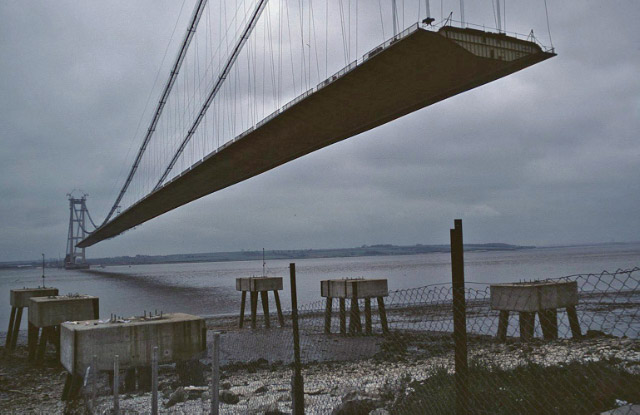
The deck under construction in May 1980. The deck was erected between October 1979 and July 1980.

The consulting engineers for the project were Freeman Fox & Partners (now Arcadis NV). Sir Ralph Freeman had produced the first ideas in 1927 and in the early 1930s the cost of the project was estimated at £1.725 million and that the bridge would be unlikely to recoup the construction or maintenance costs. In 1935 he had an idea for a 4,500-foot (1,400 m) suspension bridge for the Humber Tunnel Executive Committee.

Sir Gilbert Roberts produced more ideas in 1955 for a bridge with a 4,500-foot (1,400 m) central span, costing £15 million, to be paid for by East Riding County Council and Lindsey County Council. The 1955 design looked much like the Forth Road Bridge, which would cost £15 million, and have a 4,500 ft main span. The design would be two side spans of both 1,395ft. 2.4m vehicles would be expected in the first year, which was expected to double over ten years.

By 1959, the design would be 4,580 ft and to cost £16 million. In 1967 bore hole tests took place, with a soil survey, and wind tunnel tests of proposed designs. By 1969 the bridge, now of concrete design, would cost £20 million.

When it became likely that a bridge would be constructed, Imperial College-educated Bernard Wex OBE (1922–1990) produced the design in 1964 that was actually built. The bridge was built to last 120 years. The architect was R. E. Slater ARIBA. The administration building (for the tolls) was designed by Parker & Rosner. The landscaping was designed by Prof Arnold Weddle. Wind tunnel testing took place at the National Maritime Institute (now part of BMT Limited) at Teddington, and the road deck was designed for wind speeds up to 105 miles per hour (170 km/h), but storms featuring considerably lower wind speeds have been cited as grounds for emergency repairs in recent years.

== Construction ==
The main contractor for the steel superstructure was British Bridge Builders (the same grouping as for the Forth and Severn Road Bridges comprising Sir William Arrol & Co., then a unit of NEI Cranes Ltd, Cleveland Bridge & Engineering Company, and Redpath Dorman Long Ltd). In late March 1973, British Bridge Builders received a £15 million contract for the building of the superstructure.

The contractor for the concrete towers, anchorages and sub-structure was John Howard & Co Ltd of Chatham, Kent, which was later bought by Amec. Concrete was chosen for the towers, instead of steel, partly due to cost, but also to suit the landscape. On 22 February 1973 John Howard received a £7.6 million contract for the sub-structure. The bridge would cost £26 million.

Work began on the southern approach road in July 1972 by Clugston Construction of Scunthorpe. The 1.6-mile (2.5 km) approach road to the A1077 junction, by Costain Civil Engineering, began in September 1976. It included a 350-yard (320 m) span from the southern anchorage of seven pre-stressed concrete box sections and the A1077 junction, costing £4.25 million.

The main southern approach roads from Barton to the M180 motorway junction at Barnetby were built in the late 1970s by Clugston Construction of Scunthorpe, opening in 1978.

Work on the bridge substructure (foundations) began in March 1973. To reduce heat of hydration in the concrete, which produces calcium silicate hydrate from belite, as much as 60 per cent of the Portland cement was replaced with ground granulated blast-furnace slag (GGBS). It took longer to build the southern anchorage due to a diaphragm wall design due to there not being enough shallow bedrock.

=== North tower ===
The towers were constructed by slipforming and the north tower was completed on 11 May 1974. In late August 1974, the first cross-beams began construction on the north tower, with a 60-ton platform, with each cross-beam at 497ft, 360ft, 253ft and 90ft. The lowest cross-beam at 90ft was 26ft thick. The top and bottom cross-beams were hollow. The Hessle tower was complete on Wednesday 30 April 1975, after 16 months.

In November 1976 the Hessle tower was offset by 530mm, by a winch from the ground.

=== South tower ===
The southern foundations (on the Barton side) were completed in September 1975, with the pier completed in March 1976, and the southern tower was completed by September 1976. The northern tower and anchorage were built on solid chalk but the southern tower and anchorage were built on fissured Kimmeridge Clay, 550 yards (500 m) from the southern shore and built with a difficult caisson design. The subcontractor for the concrete was Tileman & Co. of Shipston-on-Stour, south Warwickshire.

The south tower was to be finished by May 1975. In early March 1975, digging hit an artesian well in the west caisson, which permeated the layer of bentonite mud. Extra kentledge weight was added. The caisson was originally 11,500 tons. 3,000 tons were added to each caisson. In September 1975 the caisson had reached the required depth. Construction of the Barton tower only began in April 1976. The Barton tower grew at 100mm per hour, the Hessle tower grew at 77mm per hour, day and night, with completion after 19 weeks. The difficulty of the Barton tower added three years to construction. By early September 1976, the south tower was complete, with two cross-beams. The next two cross-beams would be added much later during 1977. In September 1976 the superstructure began.

In October 1976, two 45-tonne cranes were put at the top of the south tower. These cranes were both on the Bosphorus Bridge.

=== Cable spinning ===
The first wire acrossed the river on 21 February 1977, with three men in boat, with a rope. At 11.35am on Wednesday 4 May 1977, five men were the first to walk across the river; the cross-beams on the Barton tower had not been built.

Cable spinning took place between September 1977 and July 1979. John A. Roebling developed the wire technique in the US. Each cable weighs 5,400 long tons (5,500 t), with 37 strands of 404 lengths of cable. The cable on the northern span has four extra strands, of 404 wires, as it was under greater tension. 4 wires were taken at once, over the river, with 7,474 passes across the river.

Each cable can take a load of 19,100 long tons (19,400 t). The initial cables for the walkway became part of the crash barrier in the middle.

=== Box sections ===
The deck is of box girder form, the box sections around 140 long tons (140 t) each. The first box sections were assembled in June 1975. The winches originated from the Bosphorus bridge construction. The box sections were 140 tonnes each.

The H109 section was the first to be erected on 22 October 1979, next to anchorage, with the next section fitted on 31 October 1979. The first section across the river, H1, was fitted on on 9 November 1979. The same winches on the towers winched up the decks.

The last of the 78 river deck sections was fitted at 7.30pm on 12 June 1980, taking only 20 minutes to hoist the deck section. Subsequently there were two deck sections on the Barton side span, and two sections remaining on the Hessle side span. From 12 June 1980, it was now the world's longest bridge. On Thursday 19 June 1980, the last Barton side span section was fitted. The last box section to be fitted was on Thursday 17 July 1980 at the Hessle tower, the 124th section, taking only 40 minutes to winch, from 7.50am.

=== Other buildings ===
The toll buildings and north approach road were built by A. F. Budge of Retford, Nottinghamshire, costing £2.9 million. Work began on the administration building in November 1976. The toll system was manufactured by Plessey Controls of Poole, Dorset.

=== Deck ===
Corrosion resistance on the steelwork was provided by Camrex Corrosion of Bellshill, North Lanarkshire. The road was laid by Tarmac Roadstone of Wolverhampton with mastic asphalt.

The expansion joints were made by Demag, and the bridge bearings by Sollinger Hütte, now owned by mageba (Swiss company).

=== A-frames ===
At road level the deck was fastened to the towers through four rocking A-frames, to allow for movement caused by the catenary supporting the deck from above deflecting with the weight of passing traffic, from thermal expansion, and from changes in wind loading. The devices catered for a maximum deflection of 2 metres. By 2011 it was noticed that the pivot-pin bearings carrying the frames had worn, allowing them to drop towards the support structure. Each frame was replaced by two new components: a vertical linkage to cater for longitudinal movement and a sliding bearing for lateral displacement.

In 2017, the bridge was designated a Grade I listed building.

== Opening ==
The bridge opened to traffic on Wednesday 24 June 1981 at a final cost of £91 million (equivalent to £350,814,000 in 2025). By 7.30 am, 25 vehicles were queuing up. 32-year-old Mrs Jennifer Hall had driven the first car across, with 33-year old Mrs Christine Goodrum, of Willerby. They had queued overnight from 4.30pm on Tuesday, in their S-plate Vauxhall Viva. 800 vehicles an hour crossed on the first day, taking £1,000 per hour. Over 15,000 vehicles crossed in the first 12 hours.

=== Official opening ===
It was opened officially by Queen Elizabeth II on 17 July 1981, in a ceremony that included a prayer of dedication by the Archbishop of York and a fly-past by the Red Arrows.

=== World record ===
With a centre span of 4,630 feet; 0.88 miles (1,410 m) and a total length of 7,280 feet; 1.38 miles (2,220 m), the Humber Bridge was the longest single-span suspension bridge in the world for 17 years, until the Akashi Kaikyō Bridge opened in Japan on 5 April 1998.

=== Local benefits ===
The road-distance between Hull and Grimsby fell by nearly 60 mi (97 km); the town of Scunthorpe and environs were relieved of the passing traffic between Hull and Grimsby.

== Bridge statistics ==
The bridge's surface takes the form of a dual carriageway with a lower-level foot and cycle path on both sides. There is a permanent 50 mph (80 km/h) speed limit on the full length of the bridge.

Each tower consists of a pair of hollow vertical concrete columns, each 510 feet (155.5 m) tall and tapering from 20-foot (6 m) square at the base to 14.8 ft × 15.6 ft (4.5 m × 4.75 m) at the top. The bridge is designed to tolerate constant motion and bends more than 9.8 feet (3 m) in winds of 80 mph (129 km/h). The towers, although vertical, are 1.4 inches (36 mm) farther apart at the top than the bottom due to the curvature of the Earth. The total length of the suspension cable is 44,000 mi (71,000 km). The north tower is on the bank and has foundations down to 26 feet (8 m). The south tower is in the water, and descends to 118 feet (36 m) as a consequence of the shifting sandbanks that make up the estuary.

The bridge held the record for the world's longest single-span suspension bridge for 17 years, from its opening in July 1981 until the opening of the Akashi Kaikyō Bridge in April 1998. In June 2024, it became the thirteenth-longest, single-span suspension bridge. The central span, at 4,630 feet; 0.88 miles (1,410 m), is the longest in Britain and in the Western Hemisphere. It remains the longest single-span suspension bridge in the world that can be crossed on foot or by bicycle. The bridge is crossed twice during the annual Humber Bridge Half Marathon in June, and Hull Marathon in September.

== Toll update project ==
In July 2013, work began on introducing a new electronic tolling system. The existing Humber Bridge toll system was largely the same as it was when the bridge opened in 1981. The computer system was over 15 years old, absorbed an increasing amount of maintenance, and needed to be replaced. The project would decrease waiting times and was welcomed by business and transport leaders.

In the first phase, the toll booths and the toll plaza canopy were replaced, and in the second phase, writing, testing and setting up the new toll system was completed. From 2015 bridge users could set up an account with the bridge and pay into it. Account holders receive a device called the HumberTAG, a small electronic tag that enables the system to recognise the bridge user; the toll is automatically deducted from the user's account. Two central lanes through the plaza are free-flowing; they do not have booths and account holders are able to cross the bridge without stopping.

Plans to move to a free-flow system were moved forward in 2024 when Neology was appointed to design the system. The planning application for a new gantry to be used for the system was submitted in September 2024, with work starting in March 2025. The closure of the toll booths is planned for 30 January 2026 when the new free-flow system will be operational.

== Incidents and suicides ==
During construction of the bridge, the road deck sections were floated up on barges then hoisted into place by cables. During one of these lifting operations some of the cables on two of the road deck sections failed, leaving the sections hanging at an angle. The sections were subsequently installed.

On 24 July 1984, during the 1984–1985 United Kingdom miners' strike, a group of up to 500 miners from West and South Yorkshire held a two-hour blockade of the bridge's northern toll plaza during the morning rush hour period. The blockade caused traffic jams of up to 5 miles (8.0 km) in the Hull area and, despite a heavy police presence and the overturning of two Humberside Police vehicles, dispersed from the bridge peacefully; as the miners departed, they also held a go-slow convoy across the M62's Ouse Bridge.

On more than 200 occasions, people have jumped or fallen from the bridge since it was opened in 1981; only five people have survived. Between 1990 and February 2001 the Humber Rescue Team launched its boat 64 times to deal with people falling or jumping off the bridge. Notable incidents include the cases of a West Yorkshire woman and her two-year-old daughter who fell off the bridge in 2005 and that of a man jumping from the bridge to his death on the A63 road below in September 2006.

Plans were announced on 26 December 2009 to construct a suicide barrier along the walkways of the bridge; design constraints were cited as the reason for not installing barriers during the construction of the bridge.

In May 2017, a YouTuber with the username 'Night Scape', along with a small group, illegally scaled the bridge without safety equipment. The group of young men climbed up the structure to the top of the bridge using the suspension wires as handholds. Humberside Police and the Humber Bridge Board have reviewed the security measures.

On 3 April 2021, the Humber Bridge was closed to pedestrians and cyclists following an unspecified 'recent incident'. The decision came after multiple deaths at the bridge in March. Following the death of one individual that month, a petition calling for increased safety measures to 'secure' the bridge had gained thousands of signatures. Concerns were raised over how the change will affect those who commute on foot or by bike. On 6 May 2021, the bridge was reopened to pedestrians and cyclists between 05:00 and 21:00; only users registered in advance could use the bridge outside of those hours. More CCTV and notices were erected and more staff assigned to patrol the crossing.

== Finances ==
The bridge had a toll charge of £1.50 for cars from 1 April 2012, until for six months it was £3.00 and the only trunk road British toll bridge to charge motorcycles (£1.20). In 2004 many motorcyclists held a slow-pay protest, taking off gloves and helmets and paying the toll in large denomination bank notes. Police reported that the protest caused a queue 4 mi (6 km) long.

In 1996, Parliament passed the Humber Bridge (Debts) Act 1996 to reorganise the board's liabilities to ensure the bridge could be safely maintained. Much of the interest on the debt was suspended and deferred in a refinancing which saw no write off – the balance was to be paid using tolls.

In 2006, Shona McIsaac, Labour MP for Cleethorpes, tabled a private member's bill, the Humber Bridge Bill. The bill would have made amendments to the Humber Bridge Act 1959 (7 & 8 Eliz. 2. c. xlvi) "requiring the Secretary of State to give directions to members of the Humber Bridge Board regarding healthcare and to review the possibility of facilitating journeys across the Humber Bridge in relation to healthcare". The aim was to allow patients travelling between the banks for medical treatment to cross without paying the toll and to allow the Secretary of State for Transport to appoint two members of the board to represent the interests of the NHS. Even though the bill received cross-party support (it was co-sponsored by Shadow Home Secretary David Davis and supported by all other MPs representing North Lincolnshire and the East Riding of Yorkshire) it ran out of time later that year.

A protest at the bridge on 1 September 2007 was supported by the local Cancer Patients Involvement Group, the Road Haulage Association, Diana Wallis (MEP for Yorkshire and the Humber) and local business and council representatives. The government responded to the petition on 14 January 2008, stating that "Concessions or exemptions from tolls on the Humber Bridge are a matter for the Humber Bridge Board".

In October 2008, a joint campaign was launched by the Scunthorpe Telegraph, Hull Daily Mail and Grimsby Telegraph to abolish the toll. The papers' campaign, A Toll Too Far, was launched after a mooted increase in the toll. The campaign was to stave off a potential increase, secure a reduction to £1.00 and ultimately to be abolished. Thousands of readers backed the campaign with a paper and an online petition.

A public inquiry into the tolls was held in March 2009 by independent inspector Neil Taylor. In July 2009, the Department for Transport announced that it had decided not to allow the proposed increase. Transport Minister Sadiq Khan said he did not believe it was right for the tolls to be raised in the current economic climate. In October 2009, the government approved a £6 million grant for maintenance costs, which meant that there would be no toll increase before 2011 at the earliest, by which time tolls would have been frozen for five years.

Humber Bridge (Revision of Tolls) Order 2011
- Statutory Instrument
- Parliament of the United Kingdom
- Citation: SI 2011/1516

Dates
- Made: 17 June 2011
- Commencement: 22 June 2011
Other legislation
Repeals/revokes	Humber Bridge (Revision of Tolls and Vehicle Classifications) Order 2006
Made under	Humber Bridge Act 1971

Text of statute as originally enacted

Text of the Humber Bridge as in force today (including any amendments) within the United Kingdom, from legislation.gov.uk.

The board applied again to the Department of Transport in September 2010, to raise the tolls from April 2011 but the government ordered a public inquiry into the application. A three-day public inquiry was held in Hull in early March 2011. Following the recommendation by the planning inspector, the government gave approval, on 14 June 2011, for the increase. The toll was raised by the Humber Bridge (Revision of Tolls) Order 2011 (SI 2011/1516) on 1 October 2011, at which point it became the most expensive in the United Kingdom. The Severn Bridge/Second Severn Crossing charged £5.70 for Wales-bound traffic.

In the 2011 Autumn Statement on 29 November, the Chancellor of the Exchequer, George Osborne, announced that the government had agreed to reduce the debt on the bridge by £150 million, which would allow the toll for cars to be halved to £1.50. Following the government accepting the agreement, between the four local councils, to meet a portion of the debt if revenues proved insufficient, the Transport Secretary, Justine Greening, confirmed the reduction on 29 February 2012, with effect from April.

== Image gallery ==
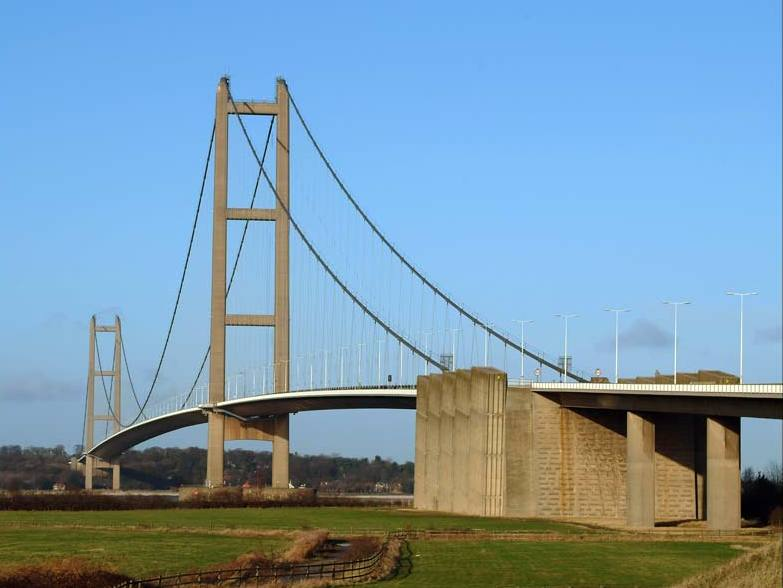
View from the south bank showing the curvature of the bridge

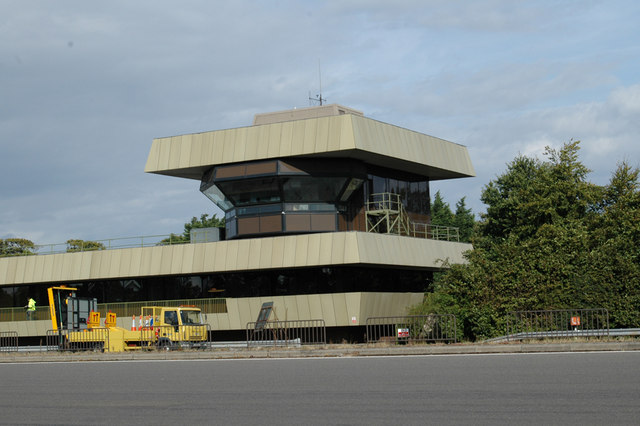
Humber bridge control room

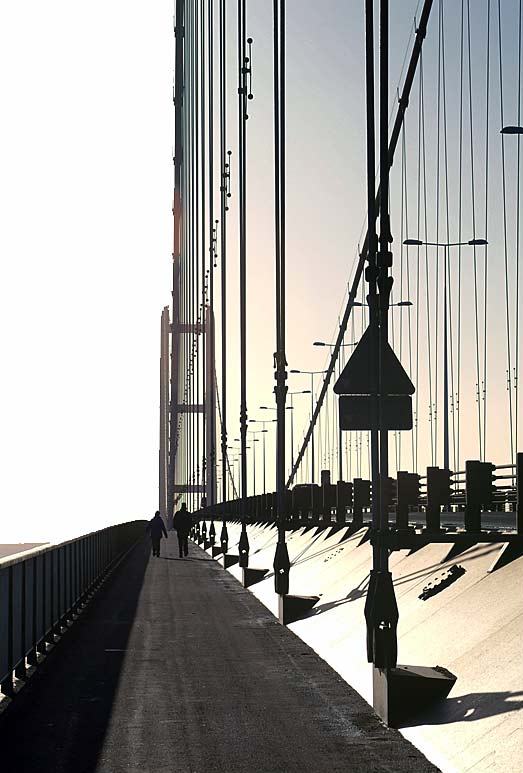
View from the eastern walkway

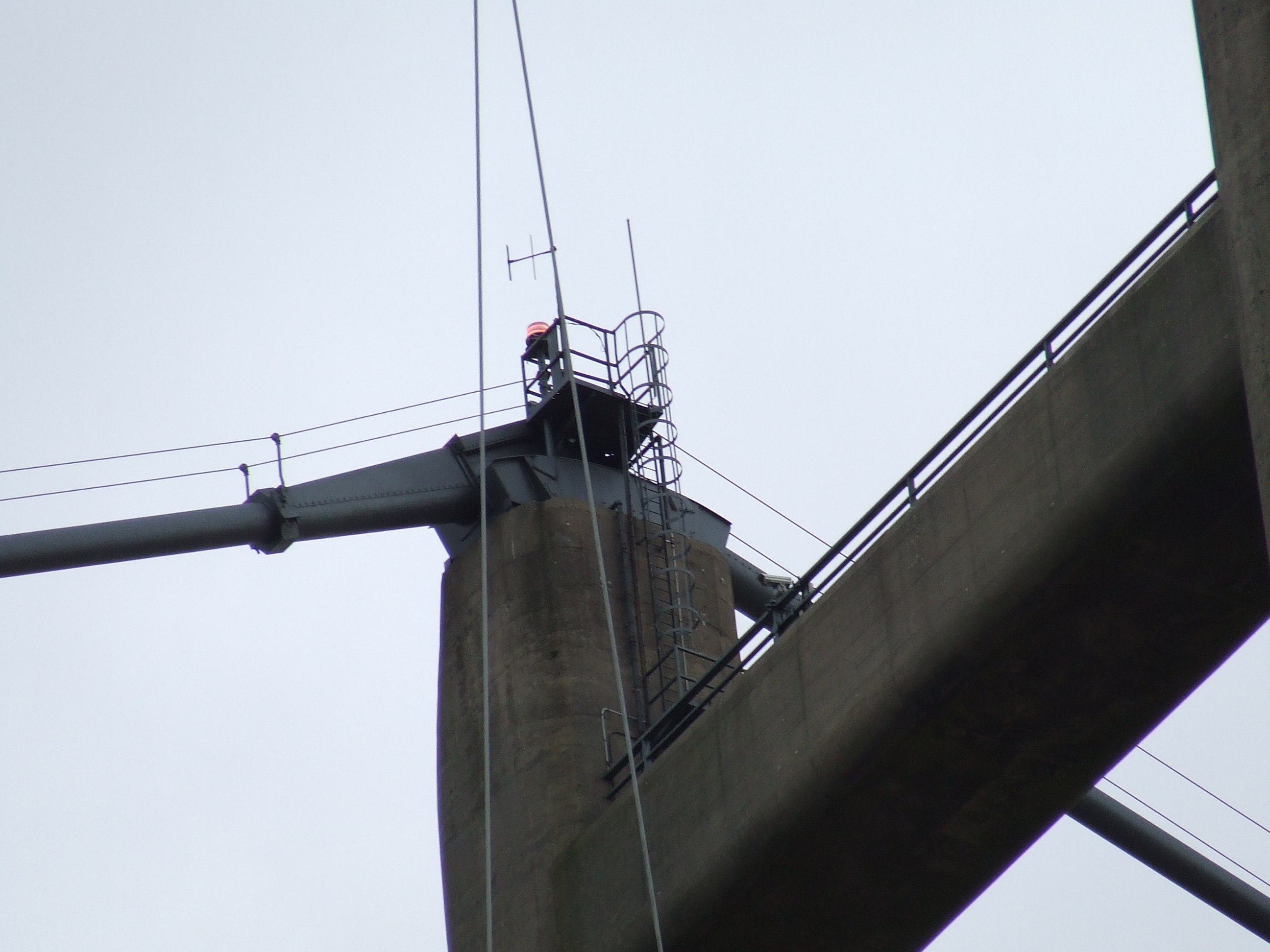
Close up of a bridge tower

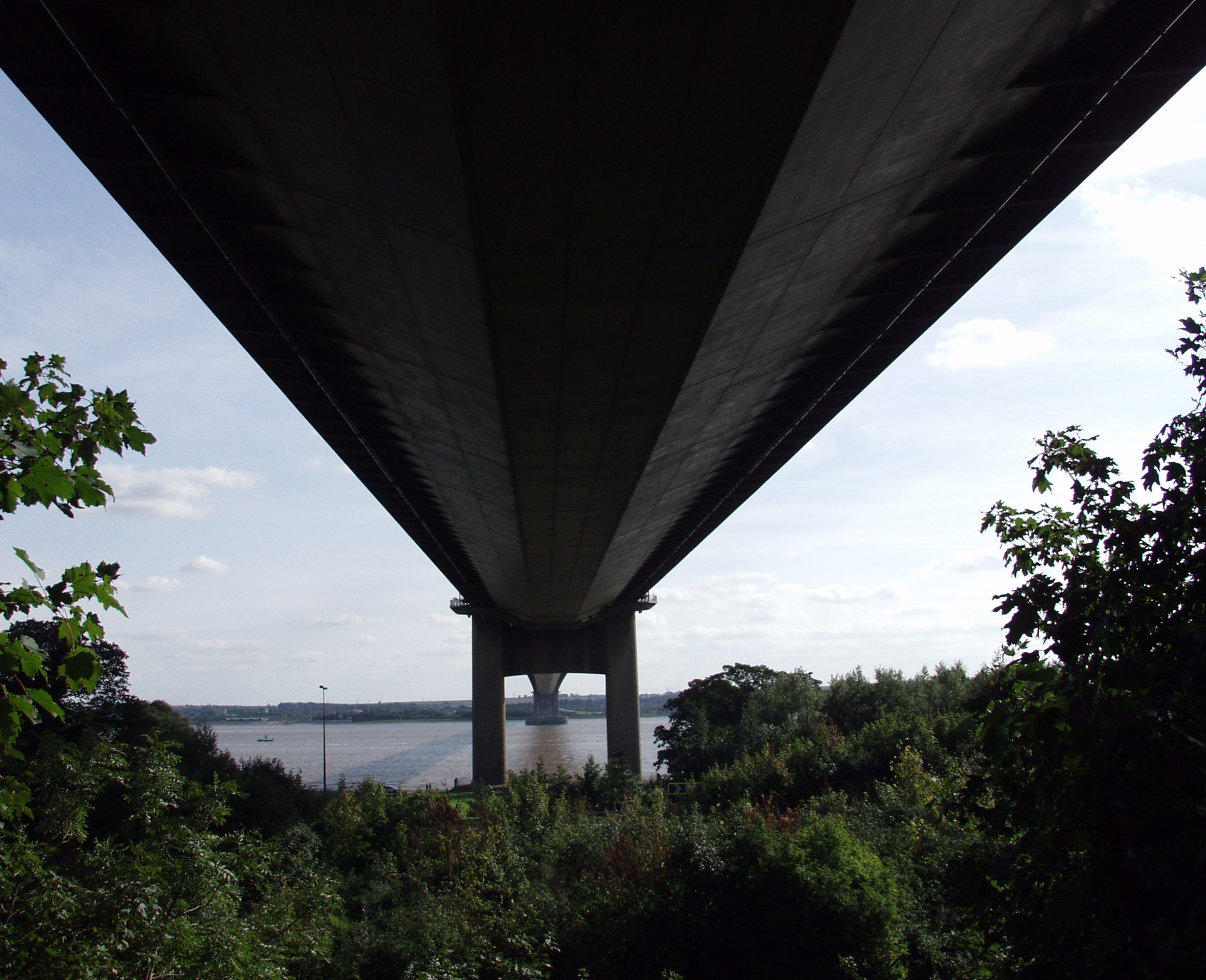
View from below the Humber Bridge towers taken from north bank

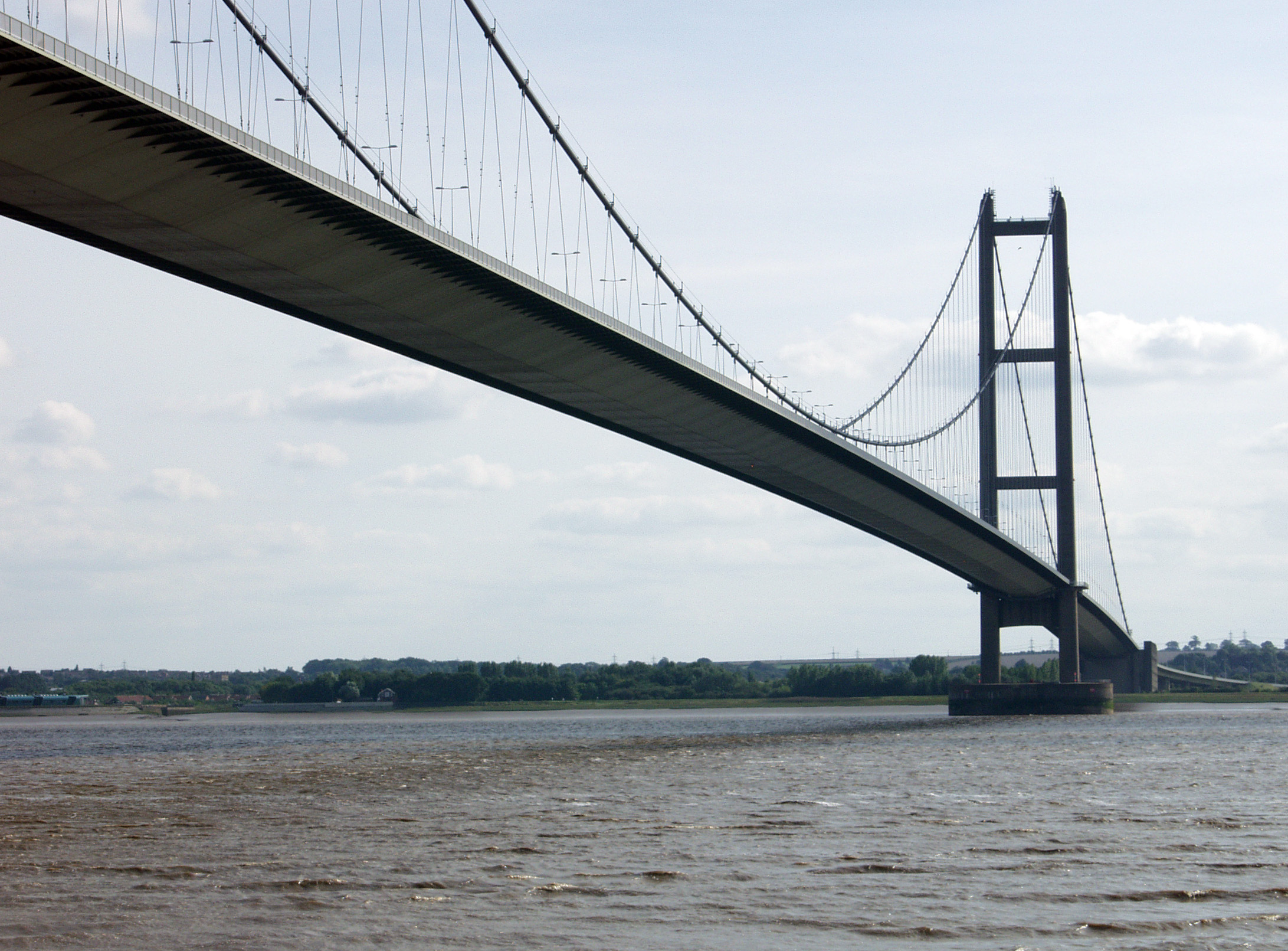
View from north bank west side

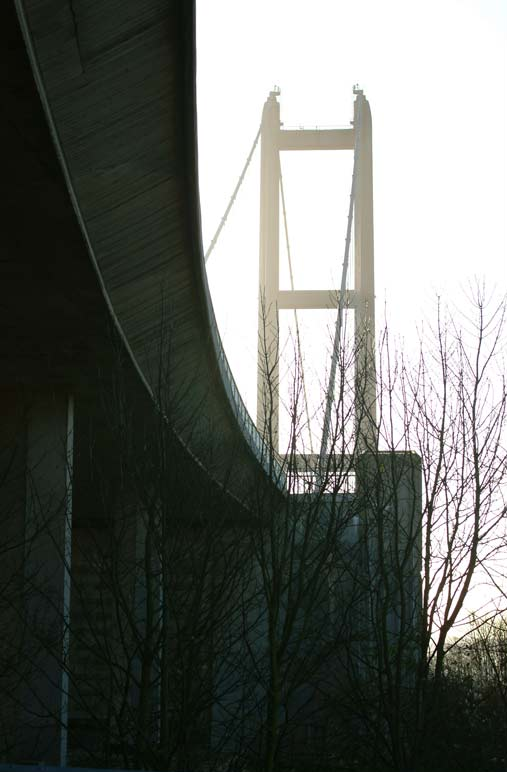
View from the north bank under the road

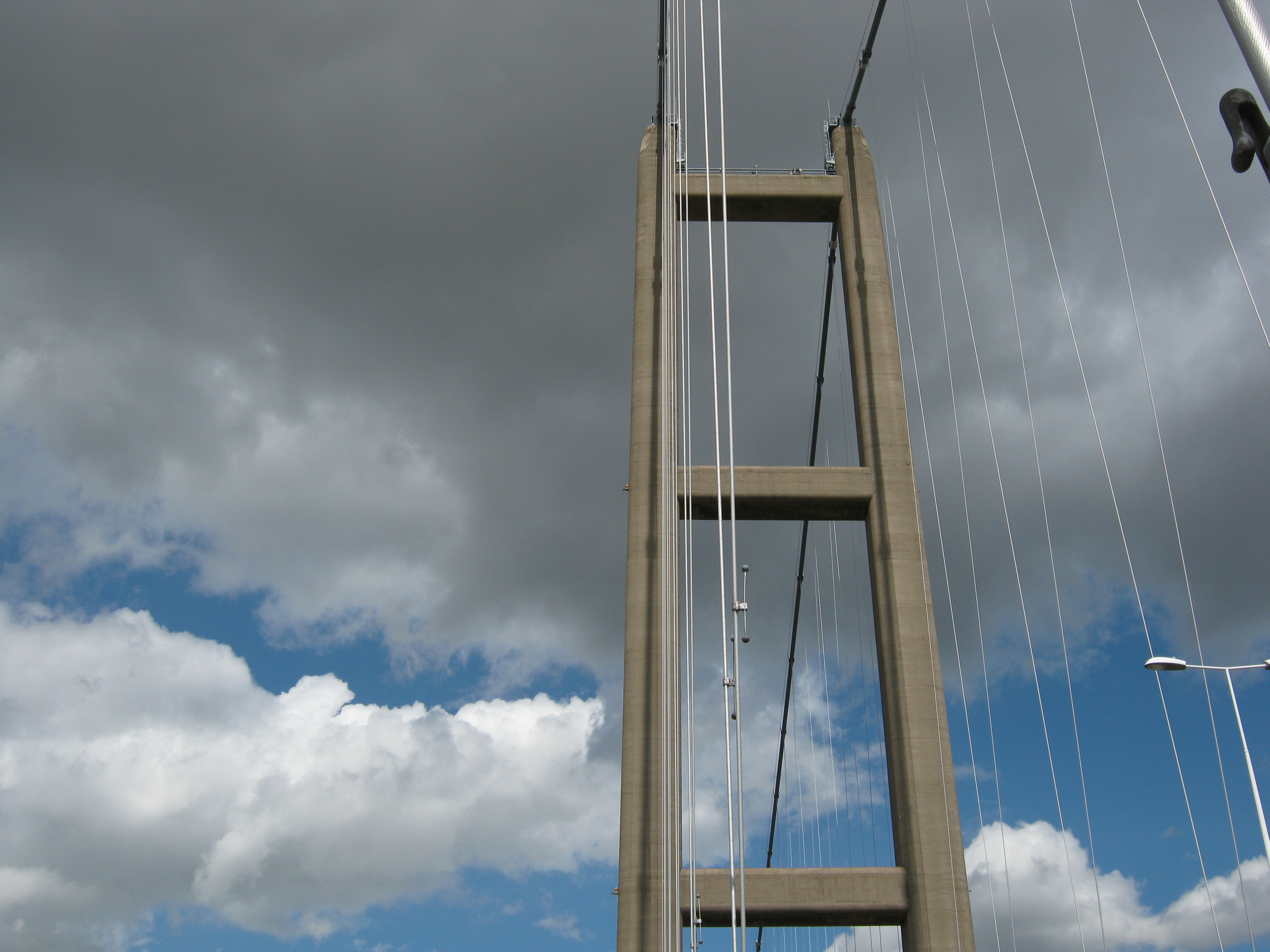
Humber Bridge Tower

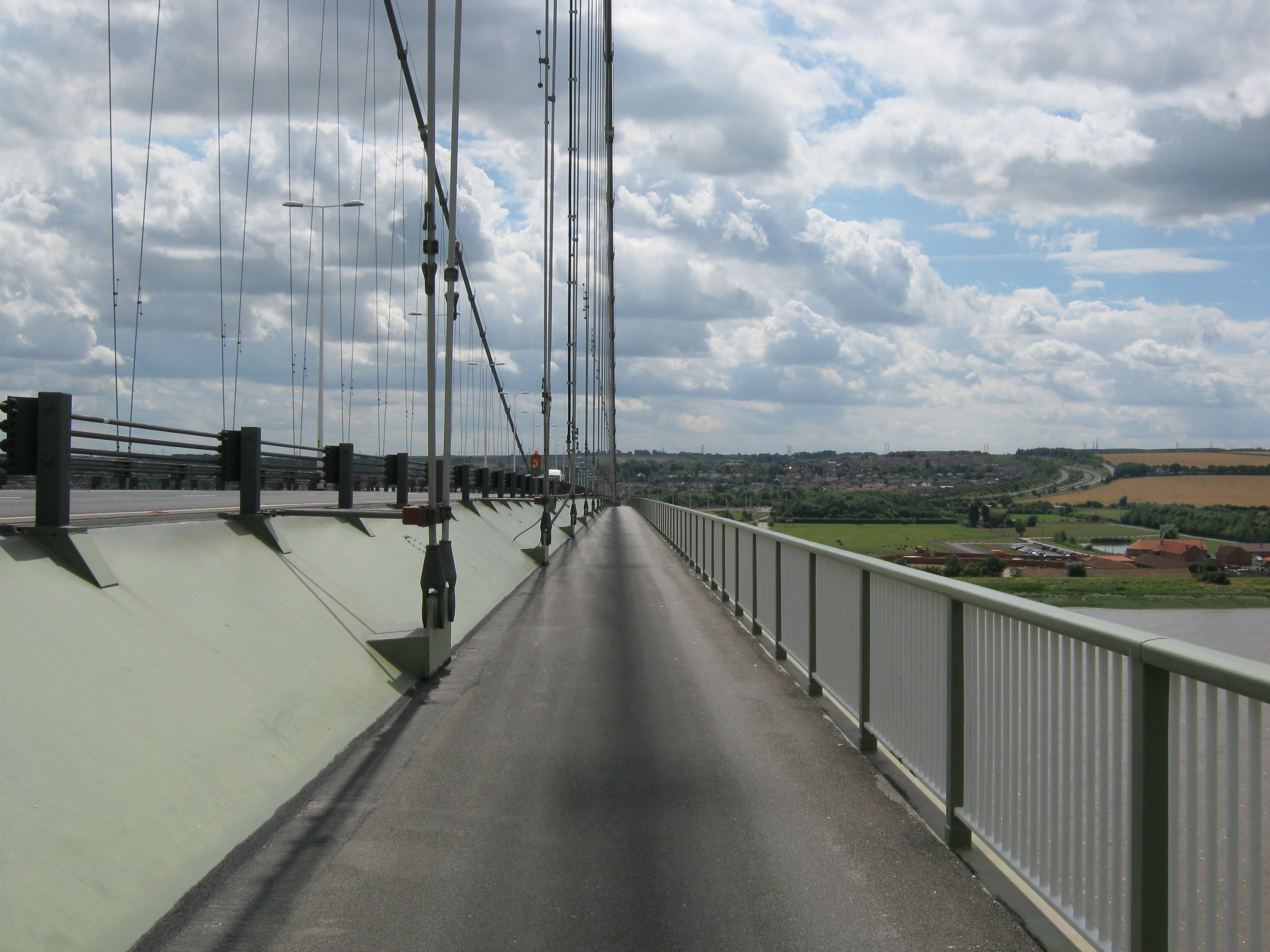
Humber Bridge Walkway
