= Robert Kyle =

Robert Kyle may refer to:

- Robert Kyle (American football) (1913–2010), American football player and coach
- Robert A. Kyle, professor of medicine
- Bob Kyle (1870–1941), Irish football manager

== See also ==
- Roberto Kyle, South African actor and vocalist
