= Riverhead Exchange =

Bus stops in Grimsby, Lincolnshire, England

Coordinates: 53.566°N 0.083°W

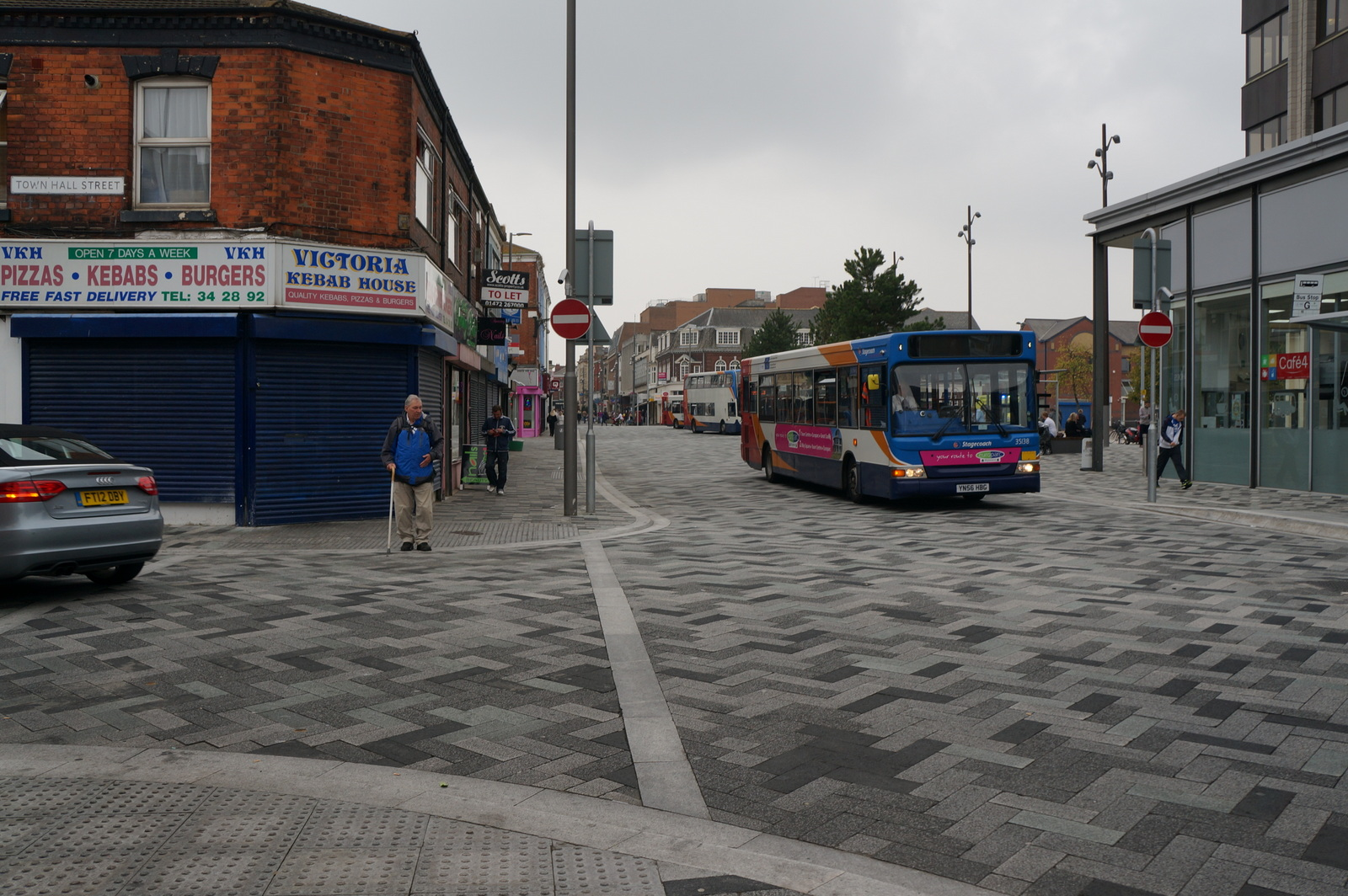
Victoria Street West looking towards Riverhead Exchange

Riverhead Exchange is a series of bus stops in Grimsby. It was formerly a bus station.

== History ==
The former bus station was called Freshney bus station and was situated outside the Freshney Place shopping centre. In 2013, plans were submitted to redevelop the bus station site by moving the bus stops. A nearby building was leased and a new cafe with toilets and bus departure information was built. The new bus station, dubbed "Riverhead Exchange", was opened in July 2014. The site of the former bus station was expected to become a cinema in an expansion of Freshney Place, but as of 2019, the site remains undeveloped. The cafe was closed in 2019 as the council decided not to renew its lease, reportedly due to financial restraints and low usage.

There are now proposals to build a new bus station in Grimsby.
