= Duncan Heath (cricketer) =

English cricketer

Personal information
- Full name: Duncan Robert Heath
- Born: 6 November 1981 (age 45); Grimsby, Lincolnshire, England
- Batting: Right-handed
- Bowling: Right-arm medium
- Relatives: John Heath (brother)

Domestic team information
- Years: Team
- 2001–2002: Lincolnshire
- 2002–2003: Cambridge UCCE
- 2002–2005: Cambridge University

Career statistics
Competition	First-class
Matches	9
Runs scored	256
Batting average	17.06
100s/50s	–/2
Top score	75
Balls bowled	741
Wickets	8
Bowling average	53.00
5 wickets in innings	–
10 wickets in match	–
Best bowling	3/28
Catches/stumpings	6/–
- Source: Cricinfo, 15 February 2019

Duncan Robert Heath (born 6 November 1981) is an English former first-class cricketer.

Heath was born at Grimsby and was educated at Sir John Nelthorpe School, before going up to Pembroke College, Cambridge to study German and Russian. While at Cambridge he made his debut in first-class cricket for Cambridge UCCE against Middlesex at Fenner's in 2002. (Note: Cambridge UCCE differed from Cambridge University Cricket Club in that it was open to students at Anglia Ruskin University, whereas Cambridge University Cricket Club is exclusively for students of the constituent colleges of the University of Cambridge.) He played two further first-class matches in 2002 for Cambridge UCCE, as well as playing a first-class match for Cambridge University against Oxford University at Oxford. He played three first-class matches for Cambridge UCCE in 2003, as well as one match for Cambridge University. His final first-class appearance came for Cambridge University in 2005. Playing a total of nine first-class matches while at Cambridge, Heath scored a total of 256 runs at an average of 17.06, with a high score of 75. He took 8 wickets with his right-arm medium pace bowling, with best figures of 3 for 28. He gained blues in both cricket and football, with Heath playing as a goalkeeper for Cambridge University A.F.C.

Heath played minor counties cricket for Lincolnshire in 2001 and 2002, making five appearances in the Minor Counties Championship, as well as two appearances in the minor counties one-day tournament. His brother, John, also played first-class cricket.
