= John Heath (cricketer, born 1978) =

English cricketer

Personal information
- Full name: John Alexander Heath
- Born: 1 June 1978 (age 48); Grimsby, Lincolnshire, England
- Batting: Right-handed
- Bowling: Right-arm medium
- Relatives: Duncan Heath (brother)

Domestic team information
- Years: Team
- 2002: Cambridge UCCE
- 2002–2003: Cambridge University
- 2002: Lincolnshire

Career statistics
Competition	First-class
Matches	3
Runs scored	44
Batting average	11.00
100s/50s	–/–
Top score	35
Balls bowled	222
Wickets	2
Bowling average	57.00
5 wickets in innings	–
10 wickets in match	–
Best bowling	2/83
Catches/stumpings	–/–
- Source: Cricinfo, 15 February 2019

John Alexander Heath (born 1 June 1978) is an English former first-class cricketer.

== Biography ==
Heath was born at Grimsby and was educated at Sir John Nelthorpe School, before going up to Pembroke College, Cambridge to study East German literature. While at Cambridge he made his debut in first-class cricket for Cambridge UCCE against Surrey in 2002 at Fenner's. (Note: Cambridge UCCE differed from Cambridge University Cricket Club in that it was open to students at Anglia Ruskin University, whereas Cambridge University Cricket Club is exclusively for students of the constituent colleges of the University of Cambridge.) He later played two first-class matches for Cambridge University, the first later in 2002 against Oxford University, and the second against the same opposition in 2003. He scored 43 runs across his two matches for Cambridge University, while with his right-arm medium pace bowling he took 2 wickets. He gained a cricket blue and graduated with a PhD.

Heath played minor counties cricket for Lincolnshire in 2002, making a single appearance at Grantham against Hertfordshire in the Minor Counties Championship. His brother, Duncan, also played first-class cricket.
