= Alexander Trees, Baron Trees =

British politician (born 1946)

The Right Honourable The Lord Trees
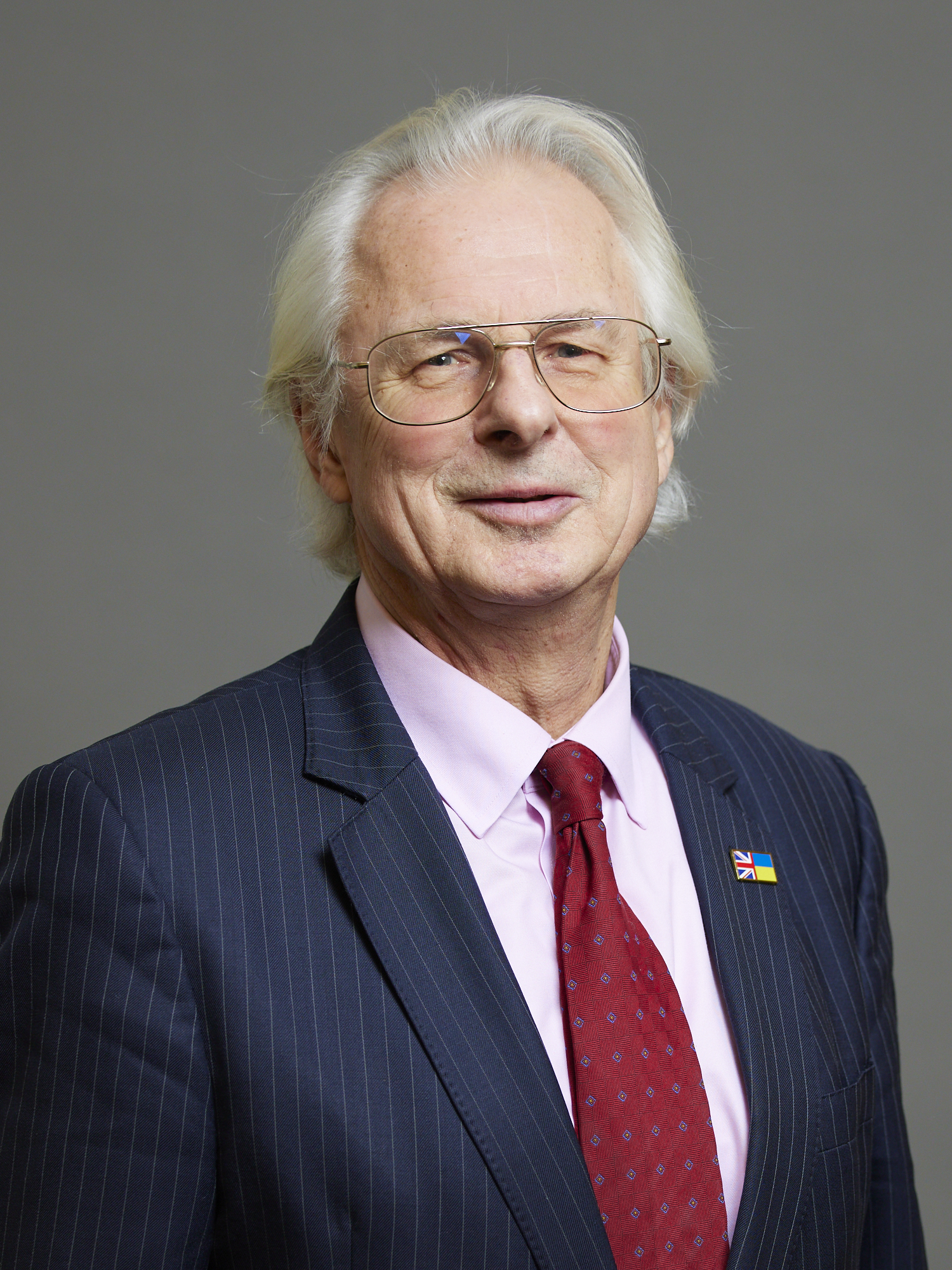
- Official portrait, 2022

Chairman of the Moredun Research Institute
- Incumbent
- Assumed office December 2011

Member of the House of Lords
- Lord Temporal
- Life peerage 3 July 2012

Personal details
- Born: 12 June 1946 (age 80)
- Education: Royal (Dick) School of Veterinary Studies, University of Edinburgh
- Occupation: Life peer, parasitology professor

Alexander John "Sandy" Trees, Baron Trees (born 12 June 1946) is a professor of veterinary parasitology and a Crossbench member of the House of Lords.

== Early life ==
Trees was born on 12 June 1946, in Middlesbrough and spent his childhood in Scunthorpe, North Lincolnshire. He was educated at Brumby Junior School and then at Brigg Grammar School between 1957 and 1964. In 1969, he graduated from Royal (Dick) School of Veterinary Studies, University of Edinburgh with a Bachelor of Veterinary Medicine and Surgery (BVM&S) and therefore qualified as a vet.

== Academic career ==
Upon graduation, Trees undertook a research expedition to Kenya in 1969 to 1970. He then spent a year as a practising veterinarian in Derby, England. This accumulated into completing a Doctor of Philosophy (PhD) on bovine babesiosis. He joined the veterinary pharmaceuticals company Elanco in Rome, Italy. He was veterinary advisor for the Middle East from 1977 to 1979, veterinary advisor for the Middle East, Turkey and Africa from 1979 to 1980, and finally Head of Animal Science in the Middle East and Africa in 1980.

In 1980, he joined the University of Liverpool as a lecturer of veterinary parasitology. He was Head of the Department of Veterinary Parasitology from 1992 to 2001. In 1994, he was made Professor of veterinary parasitology and appointed Head of the Parasite and Vector Biology Division at the Liverpool School of Tropical Medicine. He was Dean of the Faculty of Veterinary Science, University of Liverpool from 2001 to 2008. In 2011, he retired from the University.

He was Vice-President of the European Veterinary Parasitology College from 2006 to 2009. He was President of the Royal College of Veterinary Surgeons from 2009 to 2010. From 2011, he is a member of the Executive Committee of the World Association for the Advancement of Veterinary Parasitology. He has been Chairman of the Moredun Research Institute since December 2011.

In March 2016 Trees was elected an Honorary Fellow of the Royal Society of Edinburgh, the RSE's highest class of Fellowship. He was elected a Fellow of the Academy of Medical Sciences in 2019.

== House of Lords ==
On 3 July 2012, Trees was made a life peer as Baron Trees, of The Ross (a road in Comrie in Perth and Kinross), and was introduced in the House of Lords on 12 July 2012, where he sits as a Crossbench, or independent, peer. He is only the second veterinary surgeon to become a member of the House of Lords, after Lord Soulsby of Swaffham Prior.

Baron Trees made his maiden speech in the House of Lords in January 2013 on the Leveson debate.

Orders of precedence in the United Kingdom
Preceded by The Lord O'Donnell	Gentlemen; Baron Trees	Followed by The Lord Deighton
