= Grimsby =

Town in Lincolnshire, England

Coordinates: 53°34′03″N 00°04′48″W

- Town
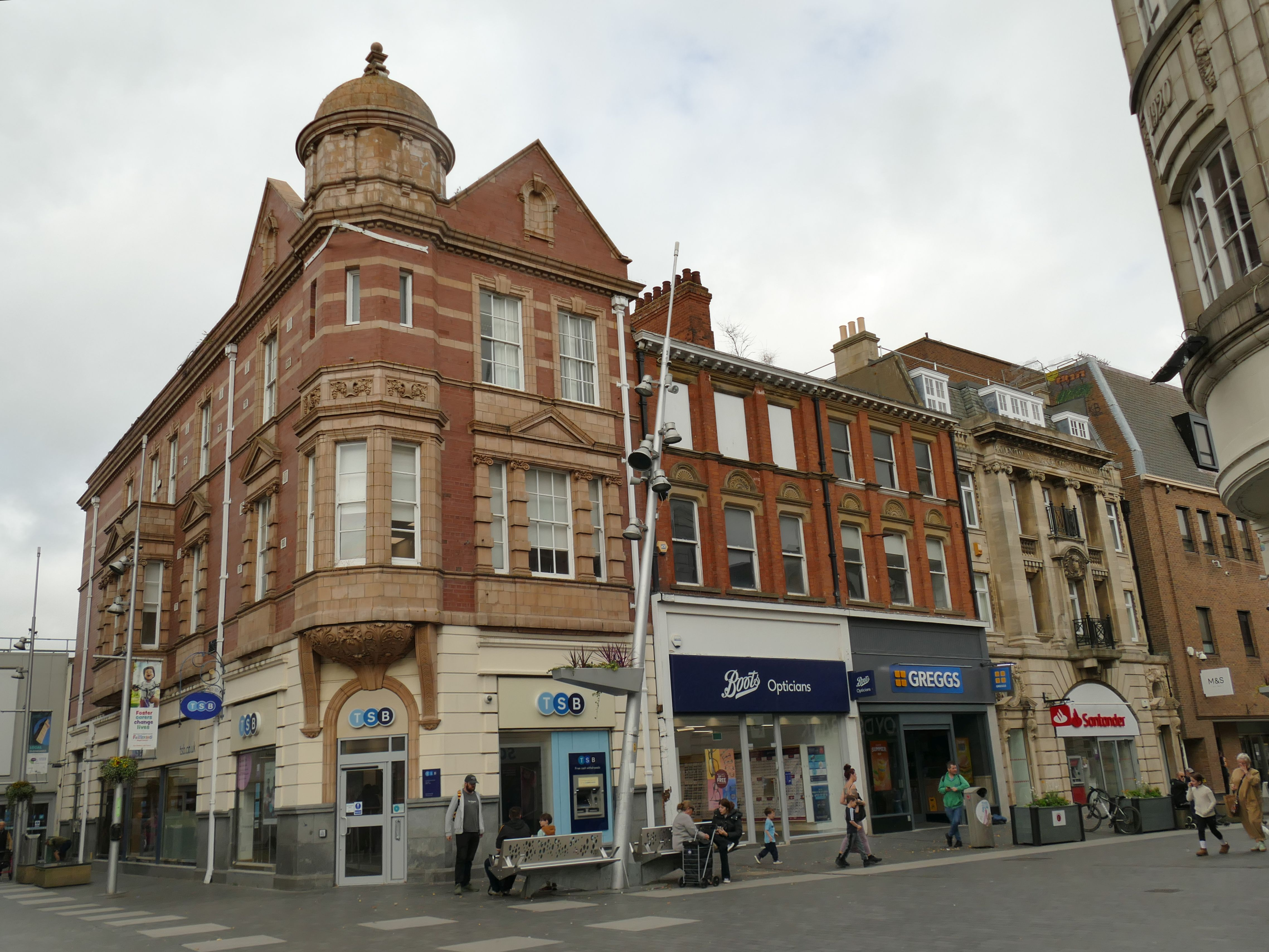
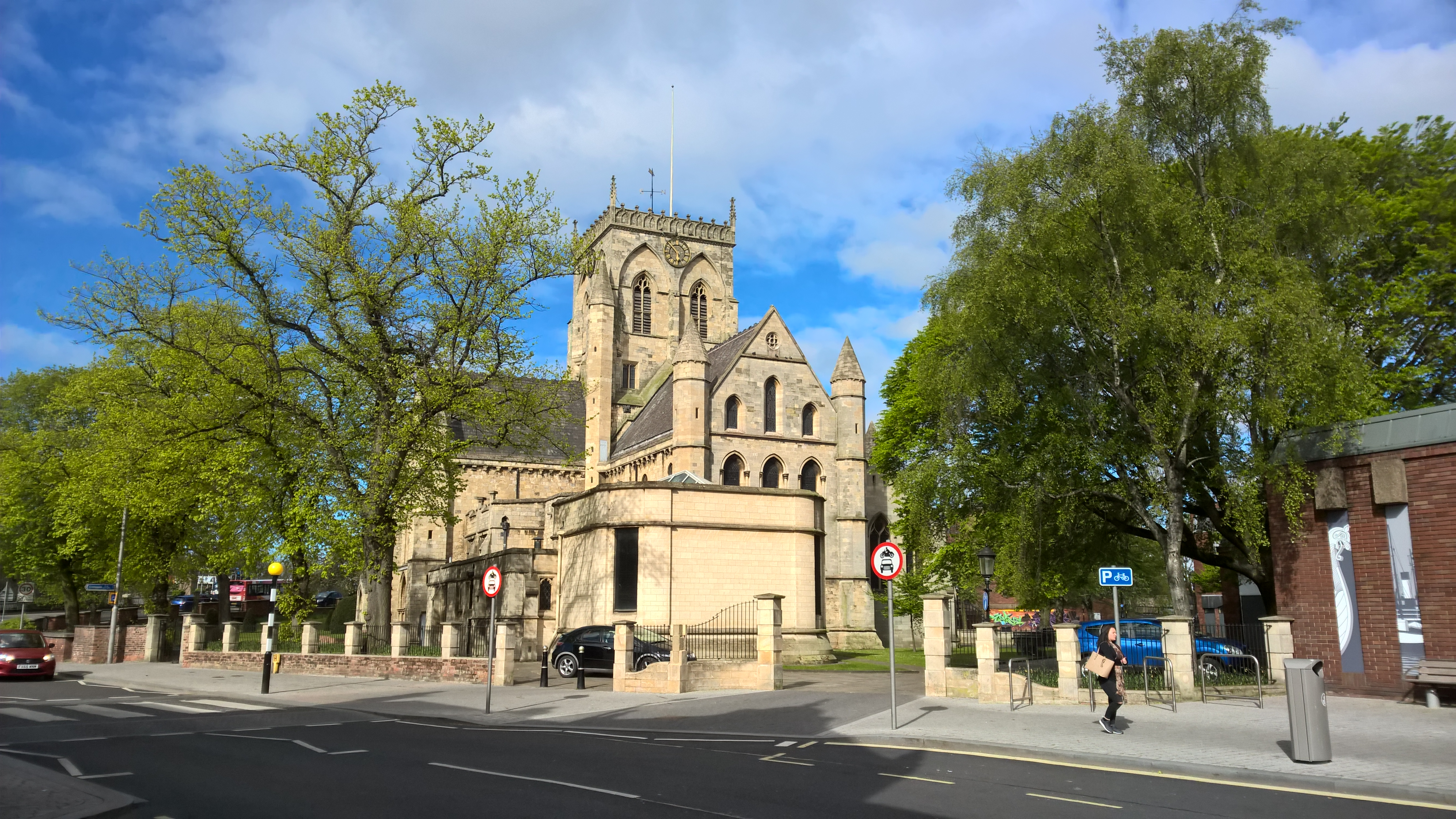
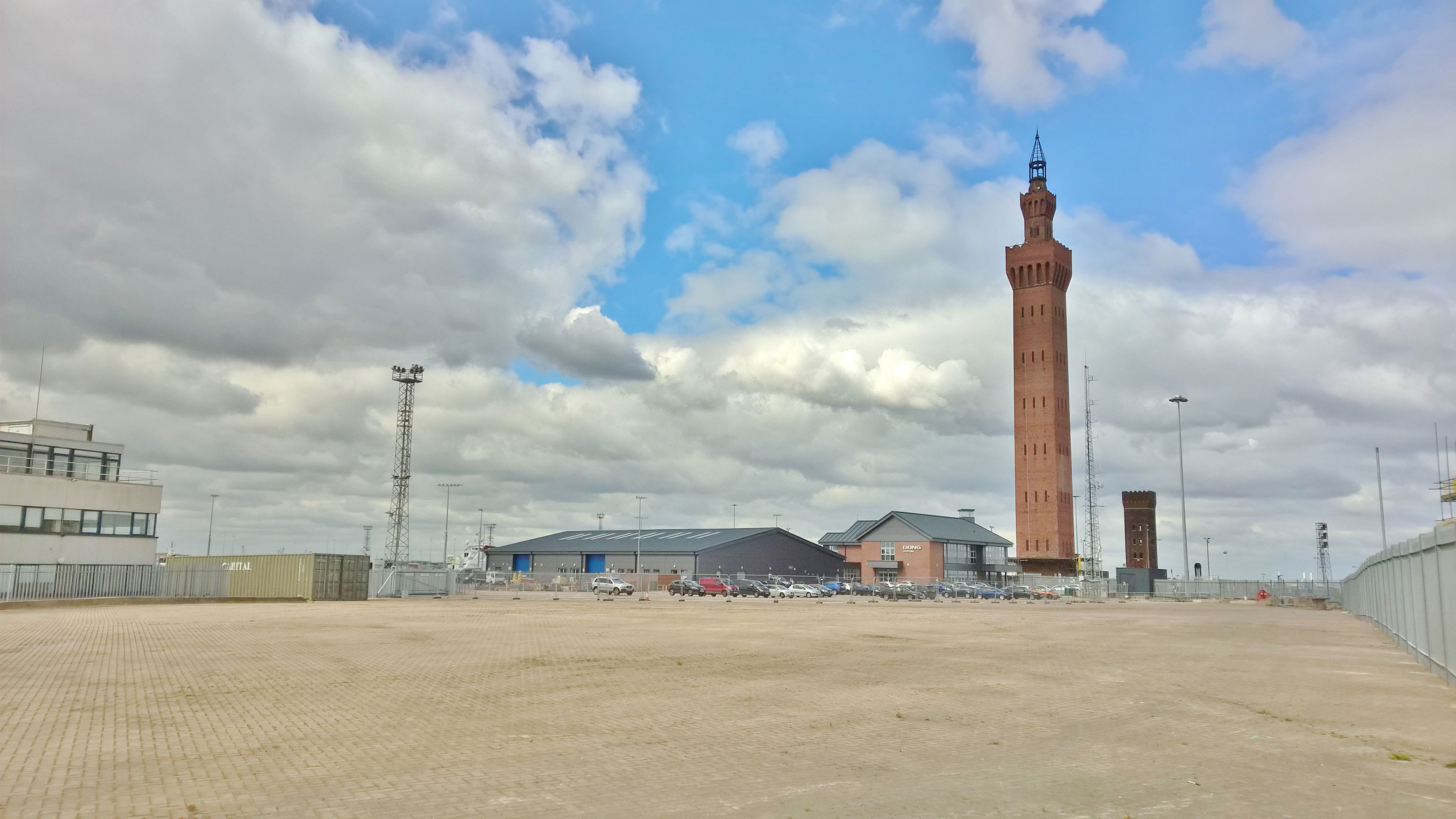
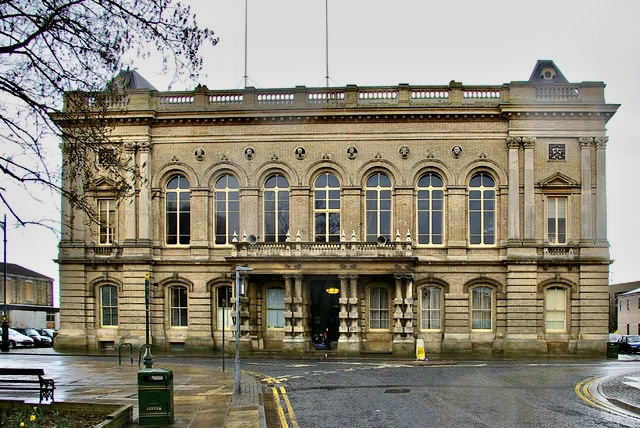
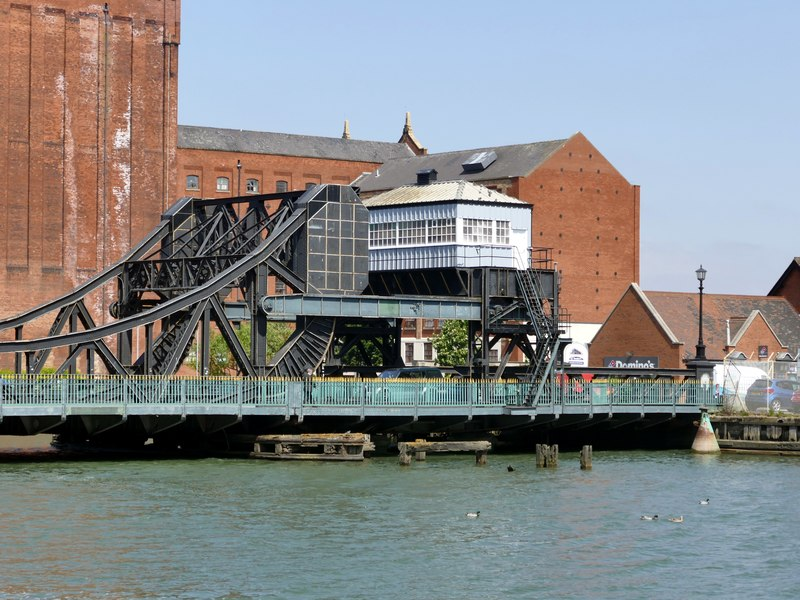
- Victoria Street West St James's Minster Dock Tower Town Hall Corporation Bridge

- Location within Lincolnshire
- Population: 86,138 (2021 Census)
- Demonym: Grimbarian
- OS grid reference: TA279087
  - London: 140 mi (230 km) S
- Unitary authority: North East Lincolnshire
- Ceremonial county: Lincolnshire
- Region: Yorkshire and the Humber
- Country: England
- Sovereign state: United Kingdom
- Areas of the town (2011 census BUASD): List: Little Coates; Nunsthorpe; Old Clee; Scartho; Scartho Top; Weelsby; West Marsh; Yarborough
- Post town: GRIMSBY
- Postcode district: DN31 – DN34, DN36, DN37, DN41
- Dialling code: 01472
- Police: Humberside
- Fire: Humberside
- Ambulance: East Midlands
- UK Parliament: Great Grimsby & Cleethorpes
- Website: www.nelincs.gov.uk

Grimsby (/ˈɡrɪmzbi/ GRIMS-bee) or Great Grimsby is a port town in Lincolnshire, England with a population of 86,138 (as of 2021). It is located near the mouth on the south bank of the Humber that flows to the North Sea. Grimsby adjoins the town of Cleethorpes directly to the south-east, forming a conurbation. It is the administrative centre of the borough of North East Lincolnshire, which alongside North Lincolnshire is officially part of the Yorkshire and the Humber region. Grimsby is 45 mi (72 km) north-east of Lincoln, 33 mi (53 km) (via the Humber Bridge) south-east of Hull, and 50 mi (80 km) east of Doncaster.

Landmarks include Grimsby Minster, Port of Grimsby and Grimsby Fishing Heritage Centre. Grimsby was once the home port for the world's largest fishing fleet around the mid-20th century, but fishing then fell sharply. The Cod Wars denied UK access to Icelandic fishing grounds and the European Union used its Common Fisheries Policy to parcel out fishing quotas to other European countries in waters within 200 nmi (370 km) of the UK coast. Grimsby suffered post-industrial decline like most other industrial towns and cities in the UK.

Food production has been on the rise in Grimsby since the 1990s. The Grimsby–Cleethorpes conurbation acts as a cultural and economic centre for much of north and east Lincolnshire. Grimsby people are called Grimbarians. The term codhead is also used jokingly, often for football supporters. The town celebrates Great Grimsby Day on 11 March, the day its town charter was granted in 1201. Grimsby is the second largest settlement by population in Lincolnshire after Lincoln.

== Geography ==
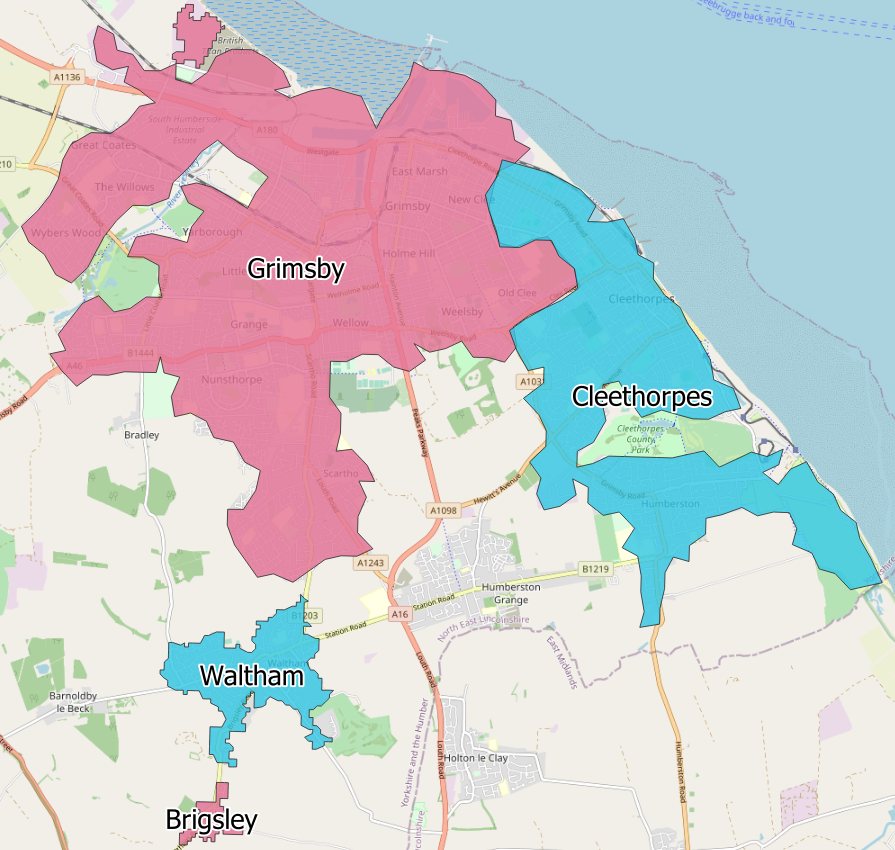
A map of the Grimsby built-up area showing its subdivisions

The town was named "Great Grimsby" to distinguish it from Little Grimsby, a village about 14 mi (23 km) to the south, near Louth. It had a population of 88,243 in the 2011 census and an estimated population of 88,323 in 2019. It forms a conurbation with Cleethorpes and the villages of Humberston, Scartho, Brigsley and Waltham. The 2011 population of the conurbation was 134,160, making it the largest built-up area in Lincolnshire.

== History ==
There is archaeological evidence of a small town of Roman workers in the area in the 2nd century AD during Roman occupation. Located on The Haven, which flowed into the Humber, the site long provided a location for ships to shelter from approaching storms. It was well placed to exploit the rich fishing grounds in the North Sea.

=== Vikings ===
Sometime in the 9th century AD, Grimsby was settled by Danes. Local folklore claims that the name Grimsby derives from Grim, a Danish (as an old term closer to "Viking") fisherman. The common toponymic suffix -by is derived from the Old Norse word býr for village (compare with Norwegian: by, Danish: by and Swedish: by). The legendary founding of Grimsby features in a medieval romance, the Lay of Havelock the Dane, but historians see this account as a myth.

In Norse mythology, Grim (Mask) and Grimnir (Masked One) are names adopted by the deity Oðin (Anglo-Saxon Woðen) when travelling incognito amongst mortals, as in the short poem known as "Grimnir's Sayings" (Grimnismal) in the Poetic Edda. The intended audience of the Havelock tale, recorded much later as the Lay of Havelock the Dane, may have taken the fisherman Grim to be Odin in disguise.

The Oðinic name "Grimr/Grim" occurs in many English place names in the historical Danelaw and elsewhere in Britain. Examples are numerous earthworks named Grimsdyke. Other British place names with the element Grim are explained as referring to Woðen/Oðin (e.g. Grimsbury, Grimspound, Grime's Graves, Grimsditch, Grimsworne), and Grimsby is likely to have the same derivation.

Grimsby is listed in the Domesday Book of 1086 as having a population of around 200, a priest, a mill, and a ferry.

=== Medieval times ===
In the 12th century, Grimsby grew into a fishing and trading port, at one time ranking twelfth in importance to the Crown for tax revenue. The town gained its charter from King John in 1201. The first mayor was installed in 1202.

Grimsby is noted in the Orkneyinga Saga in this Dróttkvætt stanza by Kali Kolsson:

Vér hǫfum vaðnar leirur vikur fimm megingrimmar;
saurs vara vant, er várum, viðr, í Grímsbœ miðjum.
Nú'r þat's más of mýrar meginkátliga látum
branda elg á bylgjur Bjǫrgynjar til dynja.

Translation:

We have waded in the mire for five terrible weeks;
there was no lack of mud where we were, in the middle of Grimsby.
But now away we let our beaked moose [ship] resound merrily
on the waves over the seagull's swamp [sea] to Bergen.

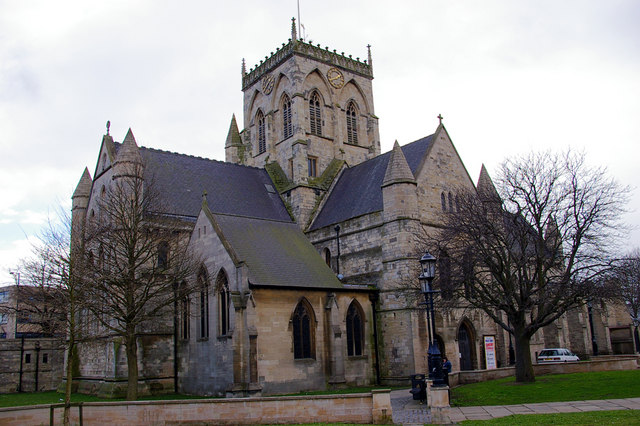
St James' Church, now Grimsby Minster, before its extension

Grimsby had no town walls. It was too small and felt to be protected by the marshland around it. However, the town dug a defensive ditch.

Grimsby in medieval times had two parish churches, St Mary's and St James. St James, now Grimsby Minster, remains. It is associated with a folk tale of an imp who played tricks in the church and was turned into stone by an angel. A similar tale is told of Lincoln Cathedral – see Lincoln Imp.

In the mid-14th century, Grimsby benefited from the generosity of Edmund de Grimsby, a local man who became a senior Crown official and judge in Ireland.

In the 15th century, The Haven began to silt up, preventing ships in the Humber from docking. As a result, Grimsby entered a long period of decline until the late 18th century. In 1801, the population of Grimsby was 1,524, around the size it had been in the Middle Ages. By 1810 Joseph Smedley was hiring a purpose built theatre for seven Guineas.

=== Rise of fishing and maritime industry ===
In May 1796, the Grimsby Haven Company was formed by the Great Grimsby (Lincoln) Harbour Act 1796 (36 Geo. 3. c. 98), also known as the Grimsby Haven Act 1796, for the purpose of "widening, deepening, enlarging, altering and improving the Haven of the Town and Port of Great Grimsby". After the dredging of The Haven and related improvement in the early 19th century, Grimsby grew rapidly as the port boomed, importing iron, timber, wheat, hemp, and flax. New docks were needed to cope with the expansion. The necessary works were allowed under the Grimsby Docks Act 1845 (8 & 9 Vict. c. ccii).

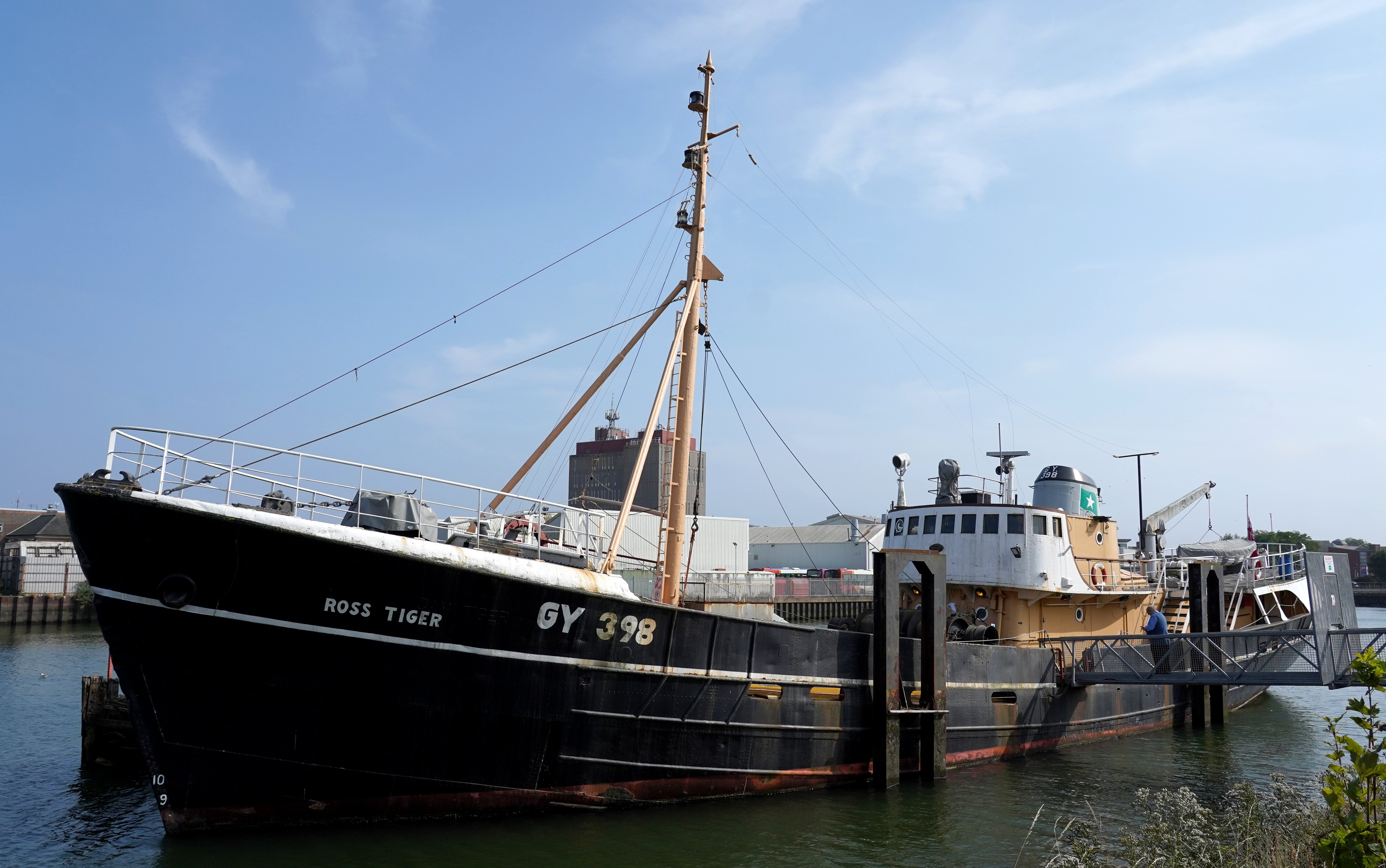
The Ross Tiger in the Alexandra Docks

In 1848, the arrival of the railway eased the transport of goods to and from the port to markets and farms. Coal mined in the South Yorkshire coalfields was brought by rail and exported through Grimsby. Rail links direct to London and the Billingsgate Fish Market allowed fresh "Grimsby fish" to gain nationwide renown. The first true fish dock opened in Grimsby in 1856, and the town became central to the development of the commercial fishing industry.

The Dock Tower was completed in 1851, followed by the Royal Dock in 1852. No.1 Fish Dock was completed in 1856, followed by No.2 Fish Dock in 1877. Alexandra Dock and Union Dock were completed in 1879. During this period, the fishing fleet was much expanded. In a rare reversal of usual trends, large numbers of fishermen from the south-east and Devon travelled north to join the Grimsby fleet. Over 40 per cent of the newcomers came from Barking in East London and other Thames-side towns.

In 1857, there were 22 vessels in Grimsby. Six years later there were 112. The first two legitimate steam trawlers built in Britain were based in Grimsby. A gale in February 1889 resulted in the loss of fifteen smacks and 70 to 80 lives. At that time it was thought to be one of the most serious losses to a single port.

By 1900, a tenth of the fish consumed in the United Kingdom was landed there, although there were also many smaller coastal fishing ports and villages involved. The demand for fish in Grimsby meant that at its peak in the 1950s it claimed to be the largest fishing port in the world. The population grew from 75,000 in 1901 to 92,000 by 1931.

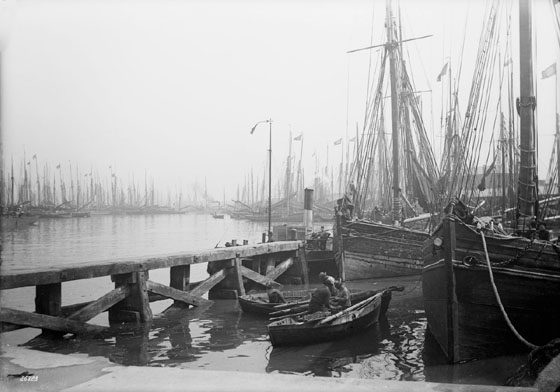
Grimsby fishing docks c. 1890

The Great Depression and restructured fishing caused a sharp decline in employment. After that the population was fairly stable for the rest of the 20th century.

=== Second World War ===
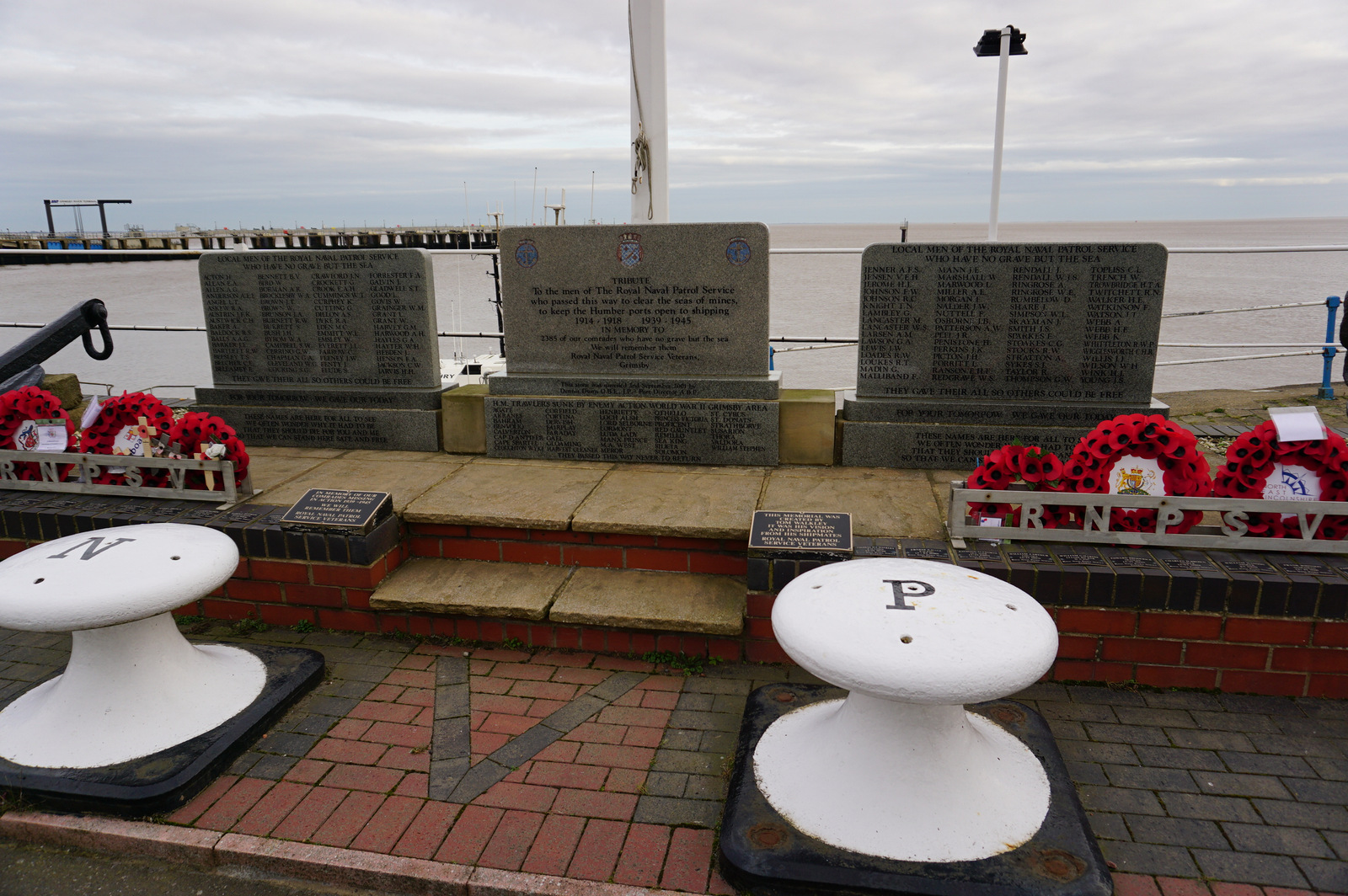
War memorial, Grimsby Dock

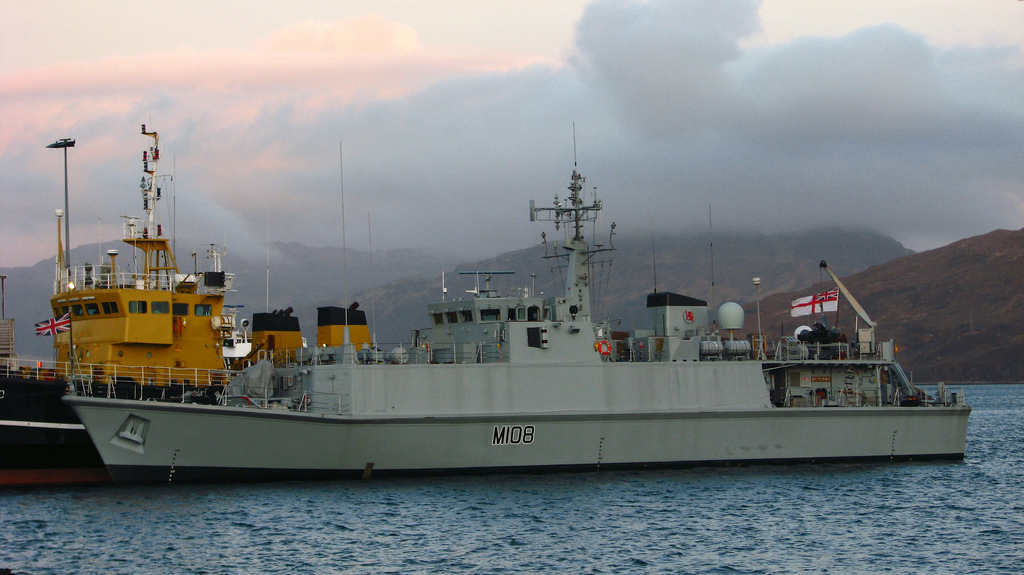
HMS Grimsby, commissioned 1999, transferred to Ukrainian service 2023

The Royal Dock became the UK's largest base for minesweepers patrolling the North Sea. The Admiralty requisitioned numerous trawlers to serve the purpose of the Royal Naval Patrol Service. Often the crew was ex-trawlermen, alongside Royal Naval Reserve and Royal Navy volunteers. Trawlers used the winches and warps from fishing operations to tow a paravane with a cutting jaw through the water in what was known as a "sweep" to bring mines to the surface and allow for their removal.

This hazardous work lost the Patrol Service more vessels than any other Royal Navy branch in the Second World War; 2,385 men died. Grimsby's Royal Naval Patrol Service veterans financed a memorial beside the Dock Tower to ensure that the bravery and sacrifice of their comrades were not forgotten.

On 14 June 1943, an early-morning air raid by the Luftwaffe dropped several 1,000-kg bombs, 6,000 incendiary bombs and over 3,000 Butterfly Bombs in the Grimsby area, killing 99 people. In total, Second World War bombing raids in Grimsby and Cleethorpes killed 196, while another 184 were seriously injured. The Butterfly Bombs that littered the area hampered fire-fighting crews trying to reach locations damaged by incendiary bombs. The search for bodies continued for a month after the raid.

=== Post-Second World War ===
After the pressures placed on the industry during the Cod Wars and the European Union's Common Fisheries Policy, which redistributed fishing quotas to other EU nations, many Grimsby firms decided to cease trawling operations there. The sudden demise of the industry brought an end to a way of life and community that had lasted for generations. The loss of the fishing industry brought severe economic and social problems for the town. Huge numbers became redundant, highly skilled in jobs that no longer existed, and struggled to find work ashore. As with the Ross Group, some firms concentrated on expanding industries within the town, such as food processing.

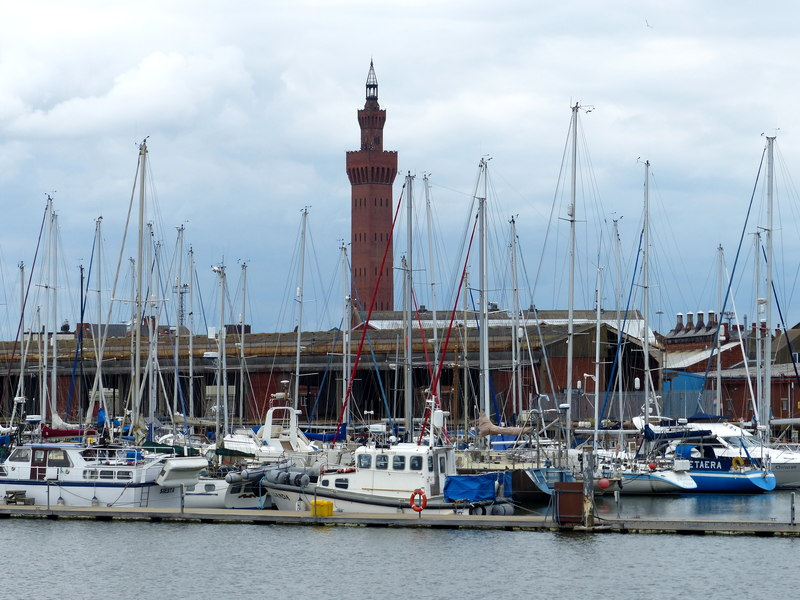
The marina and fish dock

Grimsby's trawling days are remembered through artefacts and permanent exhibits at the town's Fishing Heritage Centre. A preserved 1950s trawler, Ross Tiger, is located here. Few fishing vessels still operate from Grimsby's docks, but the town maintains a substantial fish market important in Europe.

Grimsby was struck by an F1/T3 tornado on 23 November 1981, as part of a record-breaking nationwide tornado outbreak that day. From the mid-1980s, the former Humber ferry PS Lincoln Castle has been moored in Alexandra Dock. She was used during this time as a pub\restaurant, but despite her design and status as Britain's last coal-fired paddle steamer, the catering no longer yielded a profit. The ship was broken up in 2010. Berthed in Alexandra Dock is the Ross Tiger, the last survivor of what was once the world's largest fleet of sidewinder trawlers.

The town was described in The Daily Telegraph in 2001 as one "subjected to... many crude developments over the past 30-odd years" and a town which "seemingly shuns the notion of heritage." Redevelopment was planned as part of Yorkshire Forward's Renaissance Towns Programme, but the scheme was abandoned in 2012.

In the early 21st century, the town faced the challenges of a post-industrial economy on top of the decline in its fishing industry. The East Marsh ward of the town is the second most deprived in the country, according to government statistics.

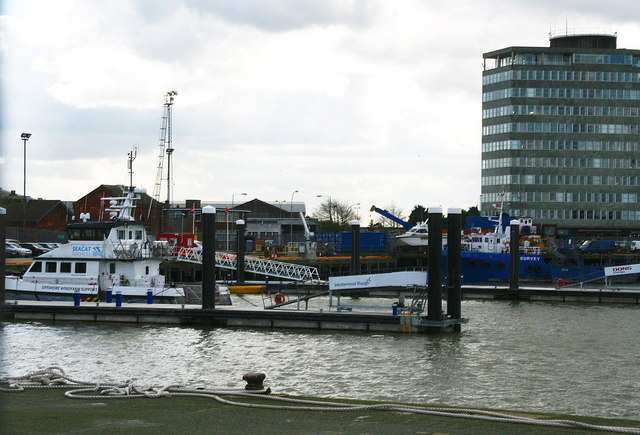
Offshore windfarm support vessels in Grimsby fish dock, with Ross House in background

== Demographics ==
A little under half of the population of Great Grimsby and Cleethorpes reported a religious affiliation in the 2021 Census, mainly Christian, with Muslim, Buddhist, Hindu, Sikh, Jewish and other minorities making up around 3% of the population. In 2024, 95.7% of the population of Grimsby town identified with a white ethnic group.

== Governance ==
=== Council wards ===
North East Lincolnshire Council has eight electoral wards within Grimsby namely:

- East Marsh
- Freshney
- Heneage
- Park
- Scartho
- South
- West Marsh
- Yarborough

=== Parliamentary constituency ===
Since the 2024 general election, Melanie Onn (Labour) has been the Member of Parliament for the Great Grimsby and Cleethorpes constituency. Onn served as the MP for the former seat of Great Grimsby from 2015 to 2019. She lost the seat to Lia Nici (Conservative) in the 2019 General Election; the first time in 74 years the Labour Party lost the seat. Austin Mitchell (Labour) held it from 1977 to 2015.

=== History ===
Great Grimsby
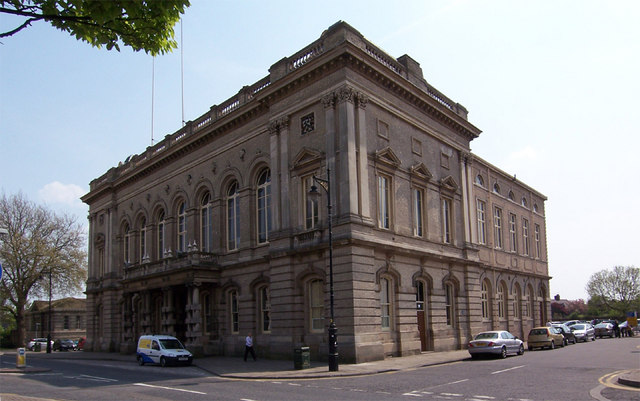
- Grimsby Town Hall

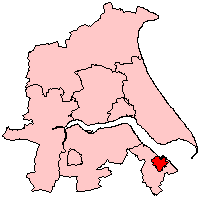
- Great Grimsby as a borough within Humberside
- Area
  - 1911: 2,868 acres (11.61 km^{2})
  - 1961: 5,881 acres (23.80 km^{2})
- History
  - Created: 1835
  - Abolished: 1996
  - Succeeded by: North East Lincolnshire
- Status: Town Charter Granted 1201; Municipal borough (1835–1889); County borough (1889–1974); Borough (1974–1996)
  - HQ: Grimsby
- Arms of Great Grimsby Borough Council

Great Grimsby formed an ancient borough in the North Riding of Lindsey. It was reformed by the Municipal Corporations Act 1835 and became a municipal borough in that year. In 1889 a county council was created for Lindsey, but Great Grimsby was outside its area of control and formed an independent county borough in 1891. The borough expanded to absorb the adjacent hamlet of Wellow (1889), also the neighbouring parishes of Clee-with-Weelsby (1889), Little Coates (1928), Scartho (1928), Weelsby (1928) and Great Coates (1968). It had its own police force until 1967 when it was merged into the Lincolnshire force.

In 1974, the county borough was abolished and Great Grimsby was reconstituted with the same boundaries as Grimsby non-metropolitan district in the new county of Humberside, under the Local Government Act 1972. The district was renamed Great Grimsby in 1979.

In the early 1990s, area local government came under review from the Local Government Commission for England; Humberside was abolished in 1996 by the Humberside (Structural Change) Order 1995 (SI 1995/600). The former Great Grimsby district merged with that of Cleethorpes to form the unitary authority of North East Lincolnshire. The town does not have its own town council, instead just a board of charter trustees. In 2007, in the struggle for identity, it was suggested that the district be renamed Great Grimsby and Cleethorpes, but this did not meet with favour among local residents, and the council leader dropped the idea a year later.

== Economy ==
=== Retail ===
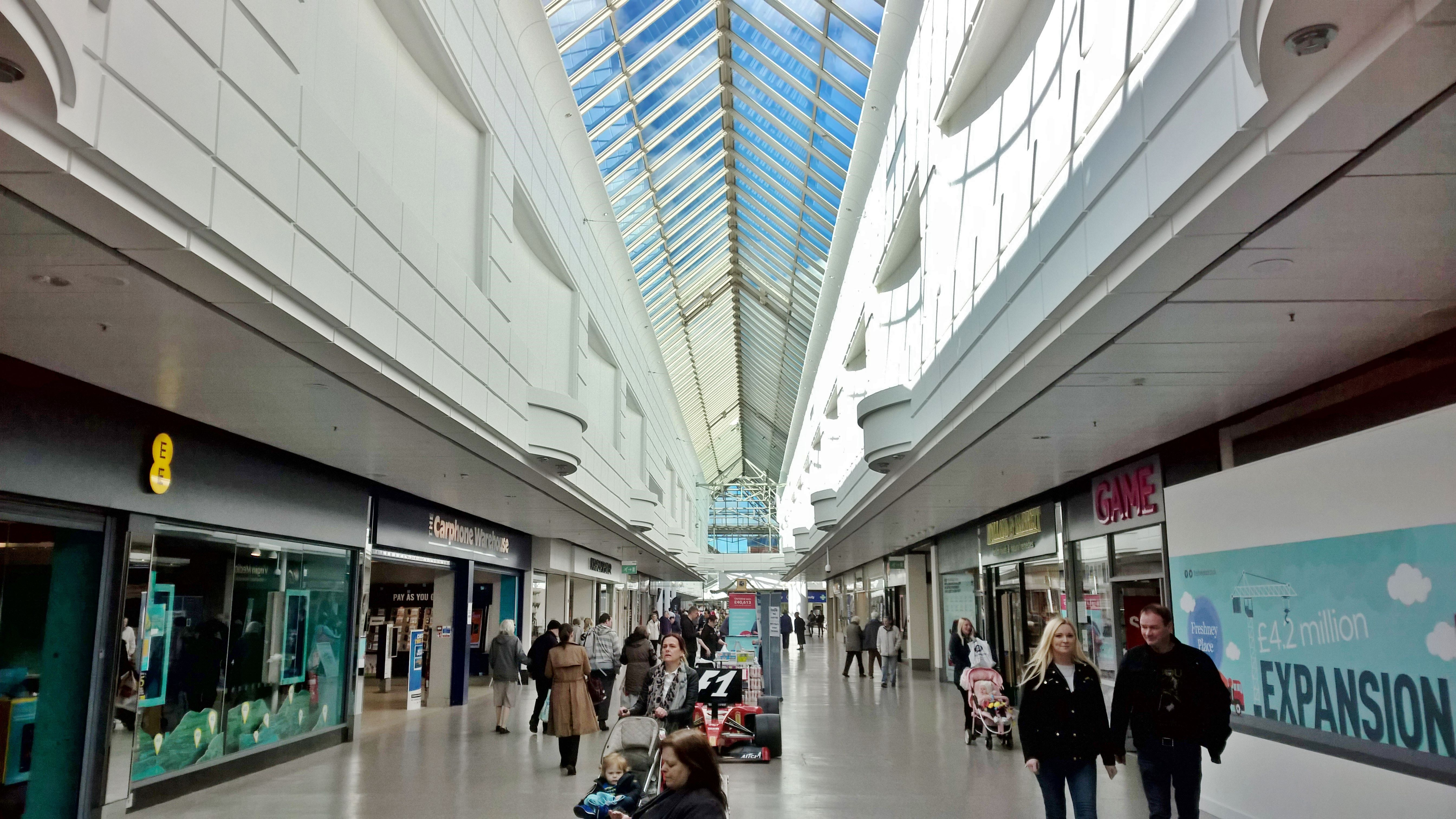
Freshney Place

High-street shopping is grouped in central Grimsby between the railway and River Freshney, where Victoria Street acts as a central pedestrianised shopping street with an undercover Freshney Place centre to the north. Freshney Place is visited by 14 million shoppers a year and employs over 2,000 staff. The centre houses over 100 stores, including Marks and Spencer and House of Fraser. Constructed between 1967 and 1971 in a joint venture between the old Grimsby Borough Council and developers Hammerson's UK Ltd., it was known as the Riverhead Centre (so named as the development was adjacent to where the two local rivers, the Freshney and the Haven, meet). Hammerson's UK Ltd began a £100 million redevelopment of the retail centre, doubling it in size. The expanded centre was covered in a glass roof. Two multi-storey car parks were constructed at each end of the centre; with this development, the old Top Town area of Grimsby was effectively privatised and roofed over. Stores are serviced at the first floor by ramps at the western end, which can accommodate even large vehicles. The ramp also provides access to the car park on the roof of the indoor market, which is operated by the local council. Freshney Place won a design commendation in the Refurbishment Category of the 1993 BCSC awards.

In the town centre Bethlehem and Osborne Street are also mixed in use, hosting retail, legal and service functions to the south of Victoria Street. Many local independent stores operate, several at the Abbeygate Centre off Bethlehem Street. Once the head office of local brewers Hewitt Brothers, the building was renovated in the mid-1980s and now houses restaurants and designer clothing stores.

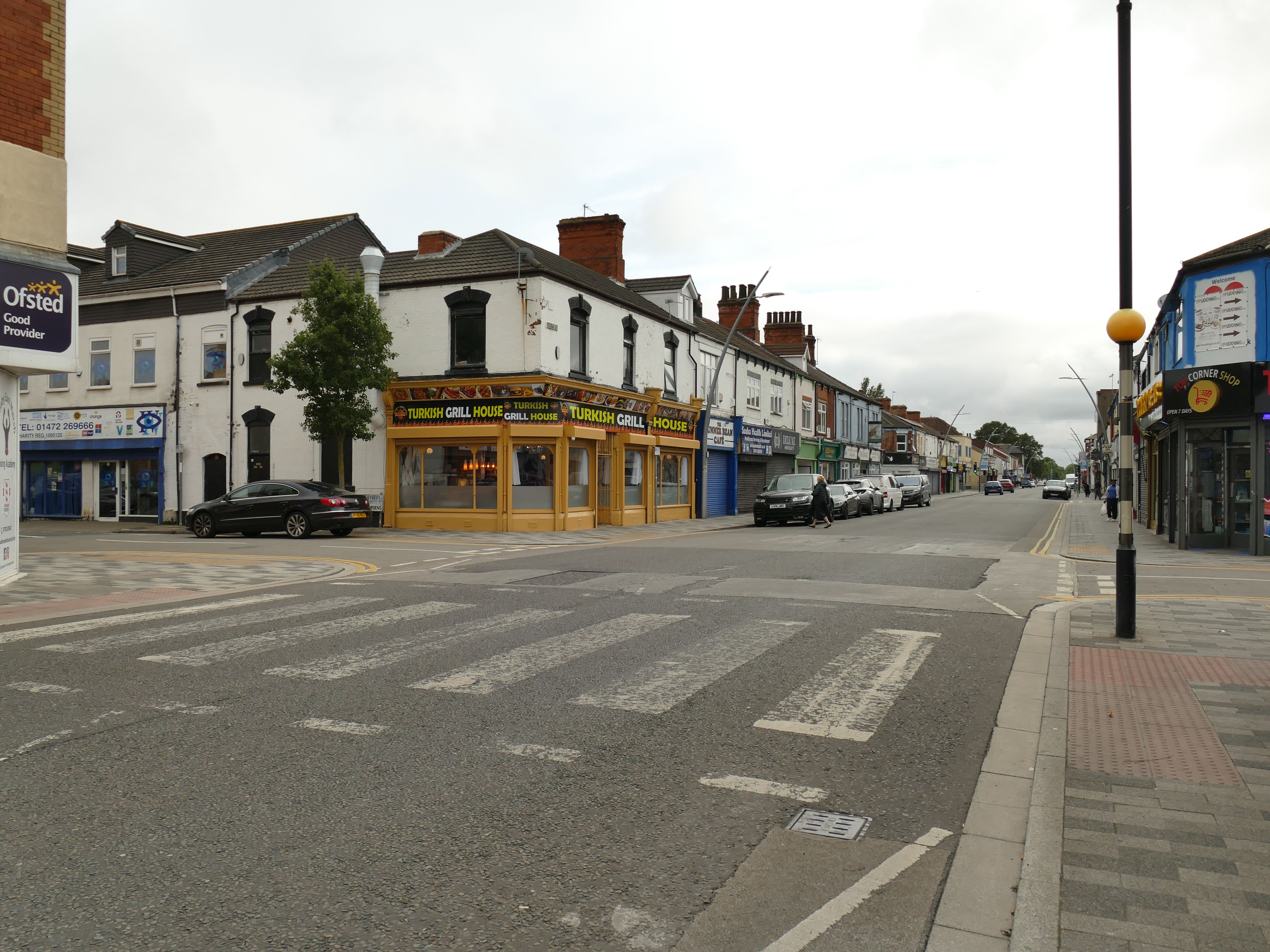
Freeman Street

The town has two markets, one next to Freshney Place and the other in Freeman Street (B1213). Freeman Street, with its close ties to the docks, once rivalled the town centre as the dominant shopping area, but industry and demographic changes have led it to struggle since the late 1970s. Freeman Street retains its covered market. Grimsby town centre has re-emerged in prominence as the docks declined and shops such as Marks and Spencer relocated to central Grimsby.

Other developments near the town centre since the 1980s include the Alexandra Retail Park and Sainsbury's to the west of Alexandra Dock, an Asda store between the town centre and Freeman Street, and the Victoria Mills Retail Park off the Peaks Parkway A16, which has several chain stores, including Next and close to a Tesco Extra (the second in the area. B&Q opened a large store off the Peaks Parkway to the east of the town centre. Unlike many towns where shopping has been built on the outskirts, these and similar developments were placed around Grimsby's town centre.

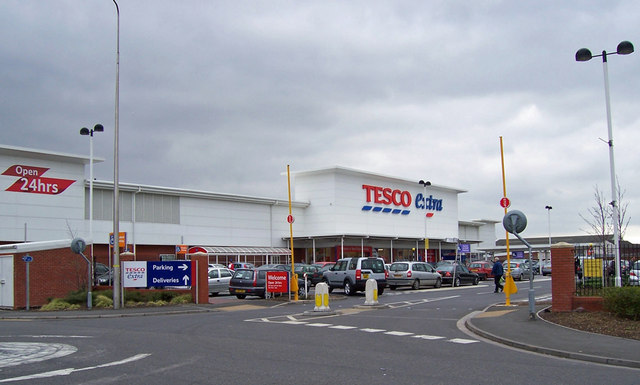
Tesco Extra

==== Former developments ====
Some out-of-town development have taken place.Morrisons store is just outside the town in the parish of Laceby. It is known as Morrisons Cleethorpes; the name deriving from a period when the area was part of the now defunct Cleethorpes Borough. Most major supermarkets have expanded in the early 21st century, including Asda, and Tesco at Hewitts Circus, which is technically in adjoining Cleethorpes.

=== The wider economy ===
The main sectors of the economy are ports and logistics, food processing, specifically frozen foods and fish processing, chemicals and process industries and digital media. Cleethorpes to the east has a tourist industry. To the west along the Humber bank to Immingham, there has been large-scale industrial activity since the 1950s, around chemicals and from the 1990s gas-powered electricity generation.

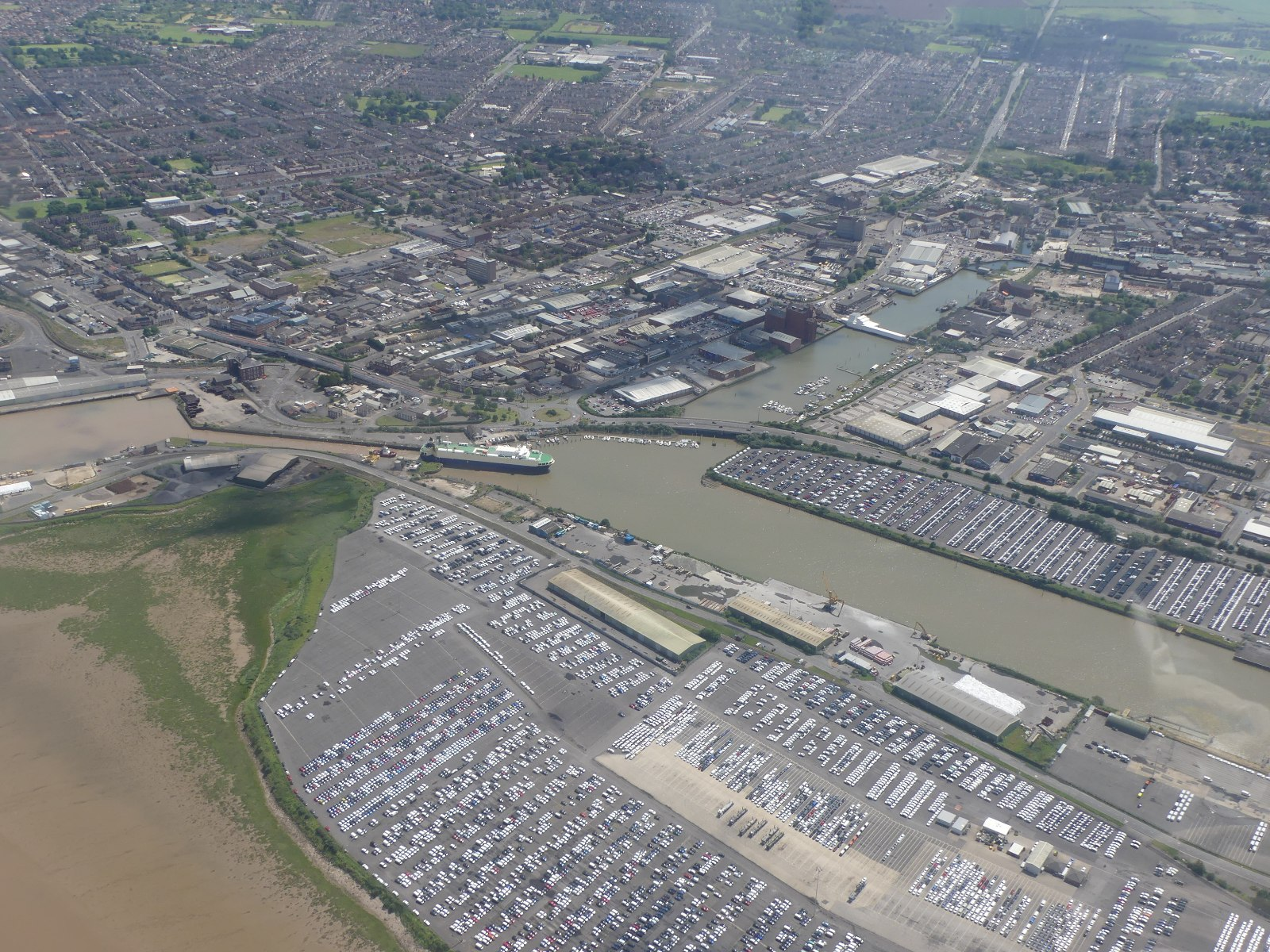
Grimsby docks and fish market

=== Food industry ===
The Grimsby Ice Factory was built in 1900 to provide crushed ice for ships to keep stored fish cold. Grimsby is strongly linked with the sea fishing industry that once generated wealth for the town. At its peak in the 1950s, it was the largest and busiest fishing port in the world. The Cod Wars with Iceland, and the European Union's Common Fisheries Policy sent this industry into decline for many years. In 1970 around 400 trawlers were based in the port, but by 2013 only five remained, while 15 vessels were being used to maintain offshore wind farms in the North Sea. The town still has the largest fish market in the UK, but most of what is sold is brought overland from other ports or from Iceland by containerisation. Of the 18,000 tonnes of fresh fish sold in Grimsby fish market in 2012, almost 13,000 tonnes, mainly cod and haddock, came from Iceland.

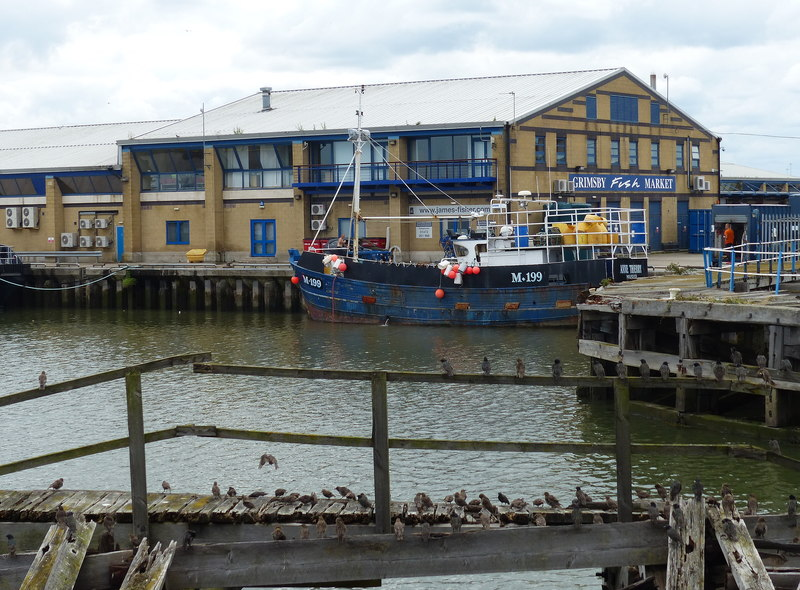
Grimsby Fish Market

Grimsby houses some 500 food-related companies; one of the largest concentrations of such firms in Europe. The local council has promoted Grimsby as Europe's Food Town for nearly 20 years. In 1998, the BBC reported that more pizzas were produced in the town than anywhere else in Europe, including Italy. The town's takeaways offer a highly localised dish known as a 'pizza platter', made up of a half-pizza, chips and coleslaw.

Grimsby is recognised as the main centre of the UK fish-processing industry; 70 per cent of the UK's fish-processing industry is located there. In recent years, this expertise has led to diversification into all forms of frozen and chilled foods. It is one of the largest centres of fish processing in Europe. More than 100 local companies are involved in fresh and frozen fish production, the largest being the Findus Group (see Lion Capital LLP), comprising Young's Seafood and Findus, with its corporate headquarters in the town. Young's is a major employer, with some 2,500 people based at its headquarters. From this base, Young's has a global sourcing operation supplying 60 species from 30 countries.

Traditional Grimsby smoked fish was awarded a Protected Geographical Indication (PGI) in 2009 by the European Union. The traditional process uses overnight cold smoking from sawdust in tall chimneys, roughly 1 by 2 m (3 ft 3 in by 6 ft 7 in) square and 10m high.

Other major seafood companies include the Icelandic-owned Coldwater Seafood, employing more than 700 across its sites in Grimsby; and Five Star Fish, a supplier of fish products to the UK food market.

The £5.6 million Humber Seafood Institute, the first of its kind in the UK, opened in 2008. Backed by Yorkshire Forward, North East Lincolnshire Council and the European Regional Development Fund, it is managed by the local council. Tenants include the Seafish Industry Authority and Grimsby Institute and University Centre. Greater Grimsby is a European centre of excellence in producing chilled prepared meals, and the area has Europe's largest concentration of cold-storage facilities.

=== Docks ===
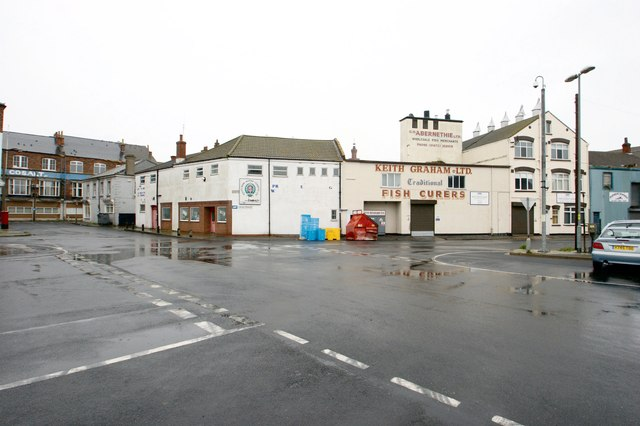
Area known as The Kasbah, Grimsby docks

The Port of Grimsby has been in use since the medieval period. The first enclosed dock, later known as the Old Dock, was built in the 1790s by the Grimsby Haven Company. Major expansion came with the railways and construction of the Royal Dock, Grimsby in the 1840s. A Fish Dock was added in 1857, and the fish docks expanded over the next 80 years. The Old Dock was expanded to form Alexandra Dock in the 1880s. The Kasbah is a historic area between the Royal Dock and Fish Dock marked by a network of streets that remains home to many artisan fish-processing businesses.

Fishing activities were reduced to a fraction of former levels in the second half of the 20th century. The current port has become a centre for car imports and exports, and since 1975 for general cargo. In the early 21st century, it has developed as a wind-farm maintenance base.

=== Renewable energy ===
Grimsby is beginning to develop as an energy centre. In 2016, Grimsby generated more electricity from renewable solar, wind, biomass and landfill gas than anywhere else in England. In 2016, Grimsby sourced 28 per cent of its electricity from green sources. Its proximity to the biggest cluster of offshore wind farms in Europe has brought around 1,500 jobs to the area, most of them in turbine maintenance.

== Geography ==
=== Location ===
Grimsby is 45 mi (72 km) north-east of Lincoln, 33 mi (53 km) (via the Humber Bridge) south-south-east of Hull, 28 mi (45 km) south-east of Scunthorpe, 50 mi (80 km) east of Doncaster and 80 mi (130 km) south-east of Leeds.

=== Suburban areas ===
Named suburban areas of Grimsby are:

Bradley, East Marsh, Grange, Grant Thorold, Great Coates, Holme Hill, Laceby Acres, Little Coates, Littlefield, Nunsthorpe, Old Clee, Pyewipe, Scartho, The Willows, Weelsby, Wellow, West Marsh, Wybers Wood and Yarborough.

=== Flooding ===
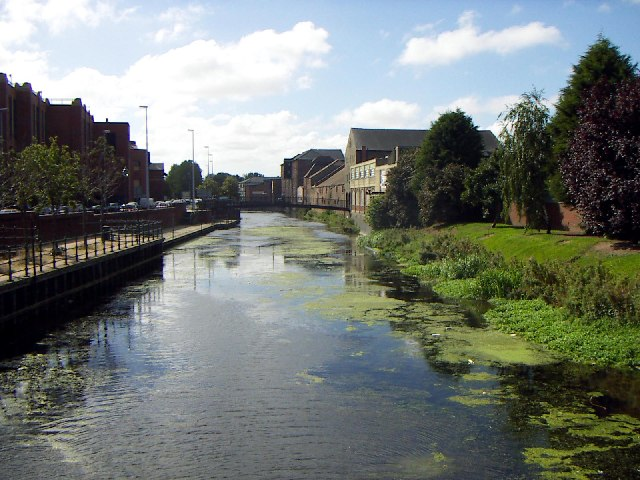
The River Freshney, which flooded in 2007

The Environment Agency has awarded Sheffield-based telemetry company CSE Seprol a contract to supply flood-warning devices for risk areas in East Anglia. The 18 sirens, at various locations round the flood-risk area of Grimsby and Cleethorpes, should reach 25,500 households to warn of flood danger. They will be sounded only in the event of the Environment Agency issuing a severe flood warning for tidal flooding, or if it is likely the sea defences will be breached. The sirens make various sounds, from the traditional wail to a voice message.

== Education ==
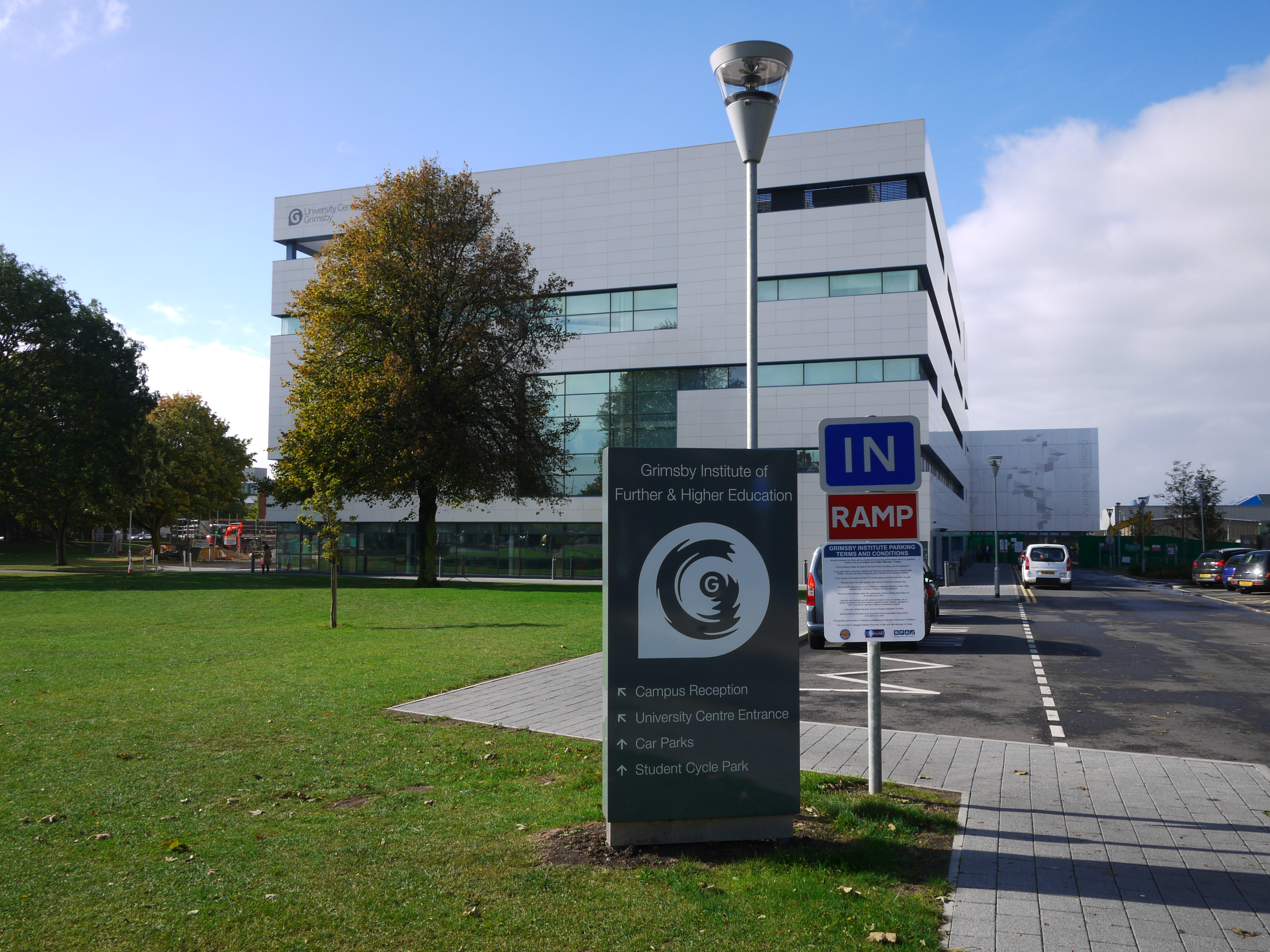
Grimsby Institute and University Centre Grimsby

Secondary schools in Grimsby include Oasis Academy Wintringham and Ormiston Maritime Academy. Private schools include St James' School. Park House mainly teaches pupils who have been suspended or excluded by other schools, and according to BBC News is "turning many of those lives around".

Franklin College is a sixth form college. The Grimsby Institute offers further and higher education courses mostly for vocational purposes. Its business courses have attracted a sizeable number of Chinese students in recent years.

== Transport ==
Grimsby lies 15 mi (24 km) from the nearest motorway, the M180, which continues as A180 into the town and acts as a link with the national motorway network. The town is skirted by the A18, with the A46 passing through to provide a connection towards Lincoln, while the A16 links it to Louth and south and eastern Lincolnshire. The transport infrastructure was described in a report by the European Commission as strong and as a help to Grimsby's transition to a food-processing centre. It was once derided as being "on the road to nowhere" by the writer and critic A. A. Gill.

=== Buses ===
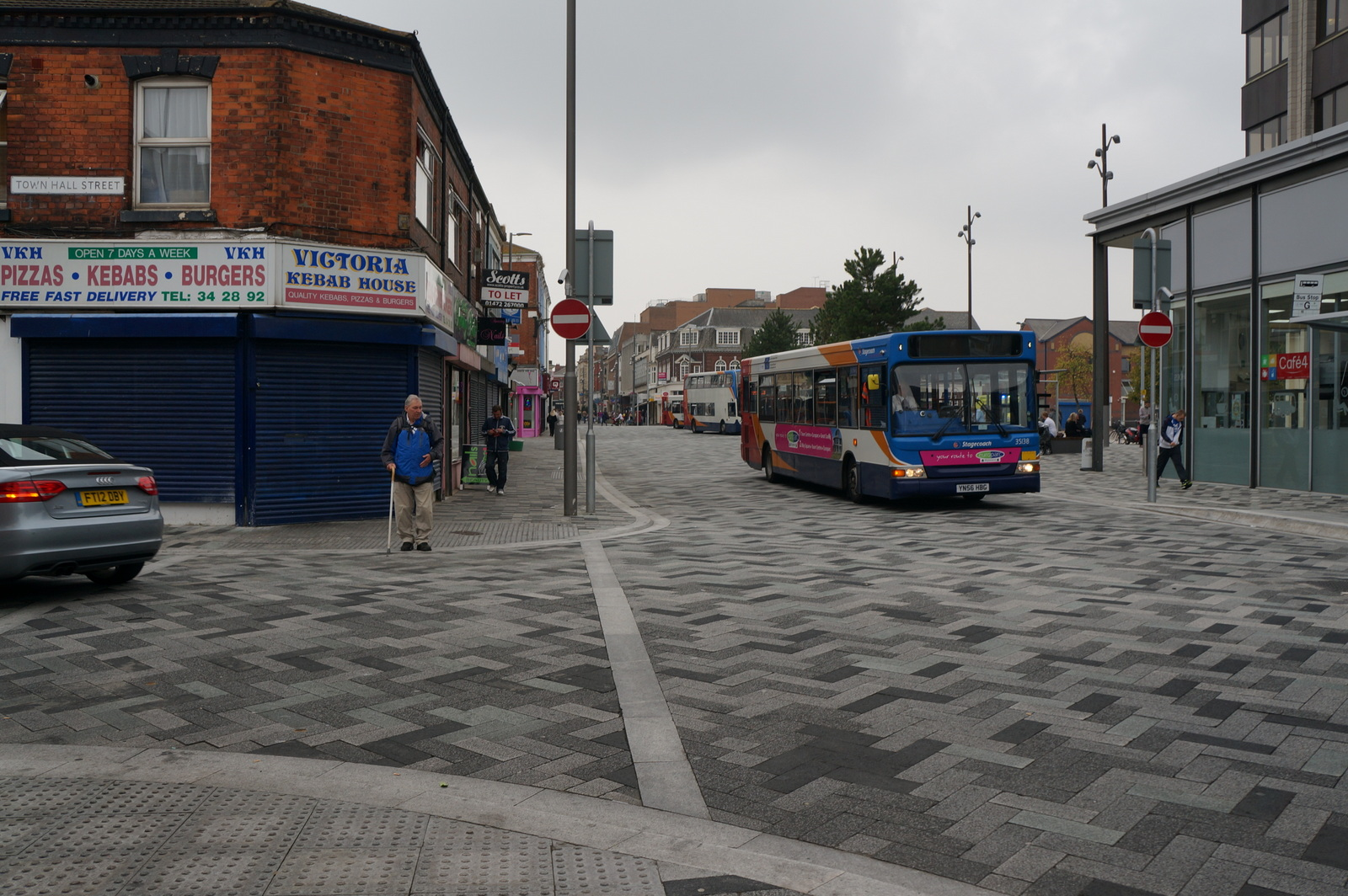
New bus provision in Grimsby known by some as the "Multicoloured stop swap" with Riverhead Exchange "Superstop" right

Grimsby's bus services are provided by Stagecoach in Lincolnshire, which took over from Grimsby-Cleethorpes Transport (CGT) in 1993. This had been formed in 1957 by a merger of separate Grimsby and Cleethorpes transport undertakings. Stagecoach had all the buses resprayed to their standard livery to replace the colour scheme of orange and white introduced in 1987. GCT ran a mixture of crewed and one-person operated services, but in 1982 the job of the conductor was abolished.

In 2005, Stagecoach bought out Lincolnshire Road Car, which served South Killingholme, Louth, Barton-upon-Humber and the Willows Estate. The company is now known as Stagecoach in Lincolnshire. Joint ticketing began with Stagecoach Grimsby-Cleethorpes in May 2006. From September 2006, a new fleet of low-floor single-deckers was introduced, making the fleet an unprecedented 85 per cent low-floor.

The main bus exchange in Grimsby is Riverhead Exchange.

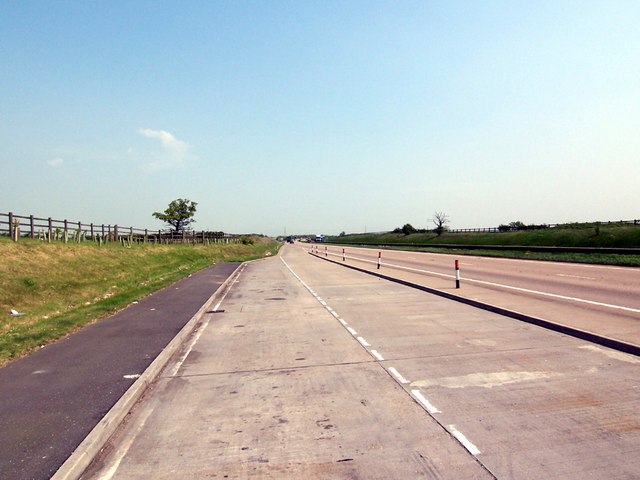
The A180 is the main route into Grimsby (from the west).

=== Railways ===
Grimsby has rail links via Grimsby Town railway station and Grimsby Docks railway station. There is a level crossing in the centre of the town across Wellowgate. TransPennine Express provides direct trains to Liverpool via Doncaster, Sheffield & Manchester, whilst East Midlands Railway operates services to Barton-upon-Humber, for buses to Hull, Northern have a single daily service Monday to Friday in each direction between Sheffield and Cleethorpes. The Leicester Via Lincoln & Nottingham are served by East Midlands Railway. The service to Cleethorpes runs at least hourly during the day along a single track with passing stations at Grimsby Docks and New Clee.

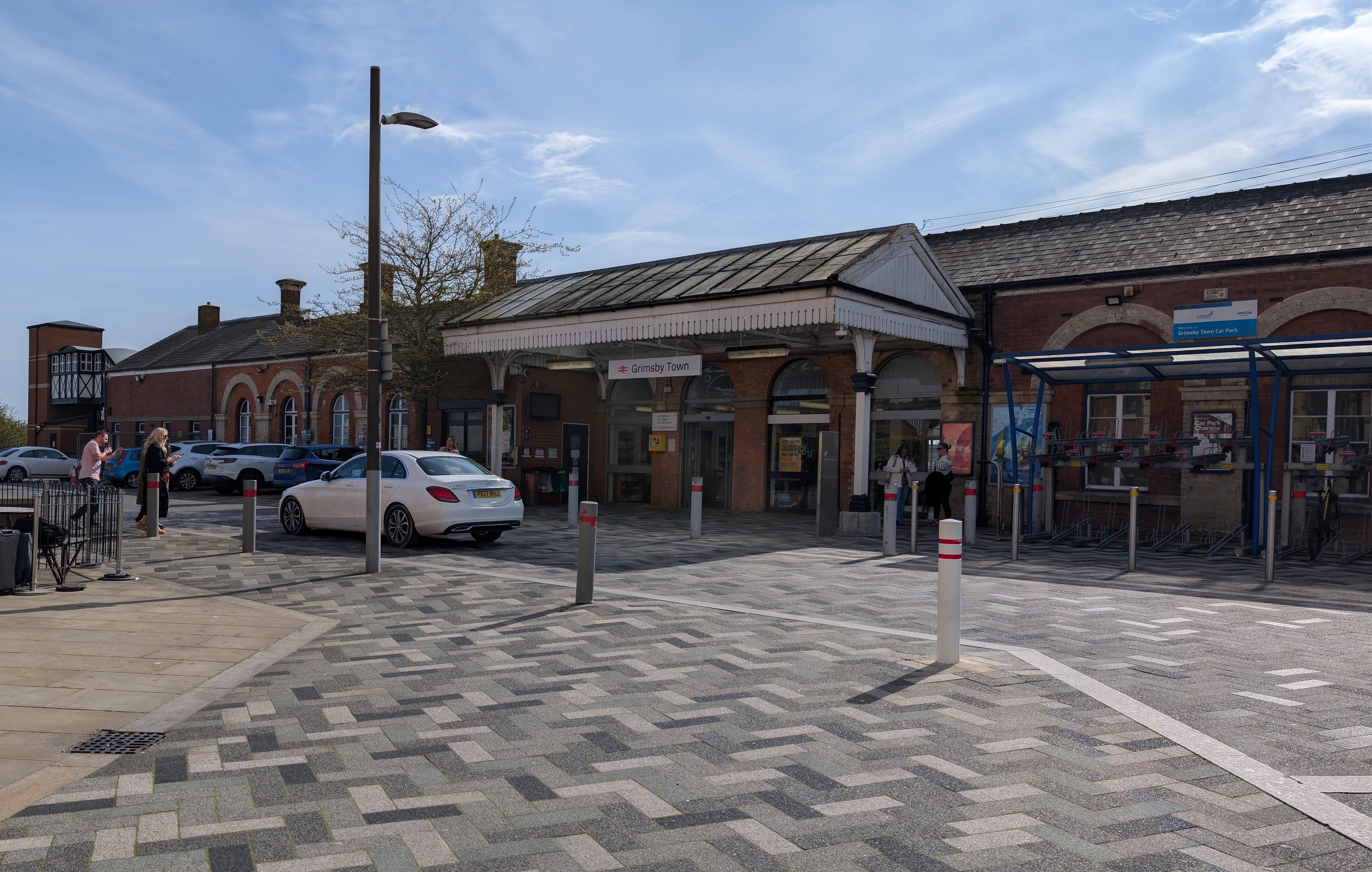
Grimsby Town railway station

=== Erstwhile trams ===
Grimsby had two tramway networks: the Grimsby District Light Railway and the Grimsby & Immingham Electric Railway.

Grimsby Electric was a normal-gauge tramway opened in 1912 between Corporation Bridge at Grimsby and Immingham. There was no physical connection with the railway system. It provided passenger services between Grimsby and Immingham until it closed in 1961. It is claimed that once this was controlled by the corporation, it had more interest in supporting the motorbus service, now No. 45.

Grimsby Light Railway opened in 1881 using horse-drawn trams. In 1901, these were replaced with electric tramways. In 1925 the Grimsby Transport Company bought the tramway company and in 1927 moved the depot to the Victoria Street Depot, an old seaplane hangar. This system closed in 1937. The depot continues to be used by Stagecoach, although the old Grimsby Tramways livery is still visible on the front of the building.

Operating in the area until the 1950s was a network of electrically operated trolleybuses served by overhead power lines.

=== Airport ===
Humberside Airport (HUY) is 14 mi (23 km) west of Grimsby and mainly caters for charter holidays and service to Amsterdam Schiphol (AMS) for international connections. It is popular for general aviation, with five flying clubs based there.

== Sport ==
=== Football ===
Grimsby Town F.C., nicknamed The Mariners, has played in League Two, the fourth tier of English football, since its promotion from the Vanarama National League in the 2021/22 season. Its ground is Blundell Park in Cleethorpes. It is the oldest professional football team in Lincolnshire and one of the oldest in the country, being formed in 1878 as Grimsby Pelham, with a home ground on land off Ainslie Street.

In the 1930s Grimsby Town played in the English First Division, then the highest level of the domestic game in England. Grimsby played in two FA Cup semi-finals in the 1930s: in 1936 against Arsenal, and in 1939 against Wolverhampton Wanderers. The latter semi-final was held at Old Trafford, Manchester, and the attendance (76,962) is still a record for the stadium.

In May 2010, Grimsby Town was relegated to the Football Conference, losing its status as a League club. It returned to the Football League after gaining promotion via the National League play-off final in 2016, beating Forest Green Rovers 3–1 at Wembley Stadium. The team reached the FA Cup quarter-finals in 1987 and in 1998 won the Auto Windscreens Shield and the second division play-off final. Notable former managers include Bill Shankly, Lawrie McMenemy and Alan Buckley.

On 27 August 2025, Grimsby successfully defeated Manchester United in the 2nd round of the EFL Cup, drawing them 2-2 in regulation and then beating them 12-11 on penalties with Bryan Mbuemo missing the final penalty.

Blundell Park's Main Stand is the oldest in English professional football. It opened in 1899, although only the present foundations date from that time. There have been plans to relocate the club to a new stadium, including one at the side of Peaks Parkway in Grimsby.

Grimsby Borough F.C. is a football club established in 2003 and based in Grimsby. It belongs to the Northern Counties East League Division One.

=== Other sports ===
An ice hockey club has been based in Grimsby since 1936. It has teams playing at various levels throughout the English Ice Hockey Association structure, under the name of Grimsby Red Wings. In 2009 the club added an ice sled hockey team to ensure that it was able to offer a fully inclusive sport for the NE Lincolnshire area.

The amateur Rugby Union side, the Grimsby RUFC, and an amateur cricket side, the Grimsby Town Cricket Club, attract reasonable levels of support. The Grimsby Scorpions American football team operated until 2014 before relocating to Hull, where it merged with Hull's team as Humber Warhawks. Despite playing in another county the club maintains representation of both East Yorkshire and North East Lincolnshire.

Tennis teams from local clubs have been successful in various inter-county competitions. The men's team from Grimsby Tennis Centre won the Lincolnshire Doubles League in 2005. Tennis players from the town represent the county on a regular basis at all age levels. Grimsby Tennis Centre underwent a major redevelopment of facilities in 2005 and is now wholly accessible to disabled people.

The town had one of the largest table tennis leagues in the country, with over 120 teams competing in the 1970s, but like the game of squash, the sport has declined in the town during recent years.

== Culture and attractions ==
=== Entertainment ===
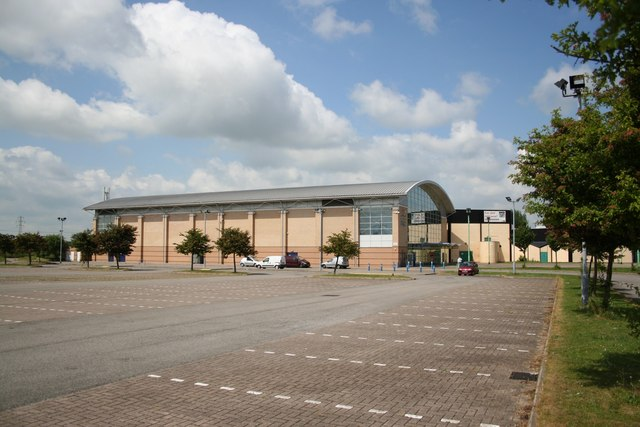
The Grimsby Auditorium

Before the late 1960s many public houses in the area were owned by the local brewer Hewitt Brothers and had a distinctive local touch. In 1969, it was taken over by the brewer Bass-Charrington. The pubs have been re-badged many times, closed or sold off. The Barge Inn is a former grain barge converted into a pub/restaurant. It has been moored at the Riverhead quay since 1982.

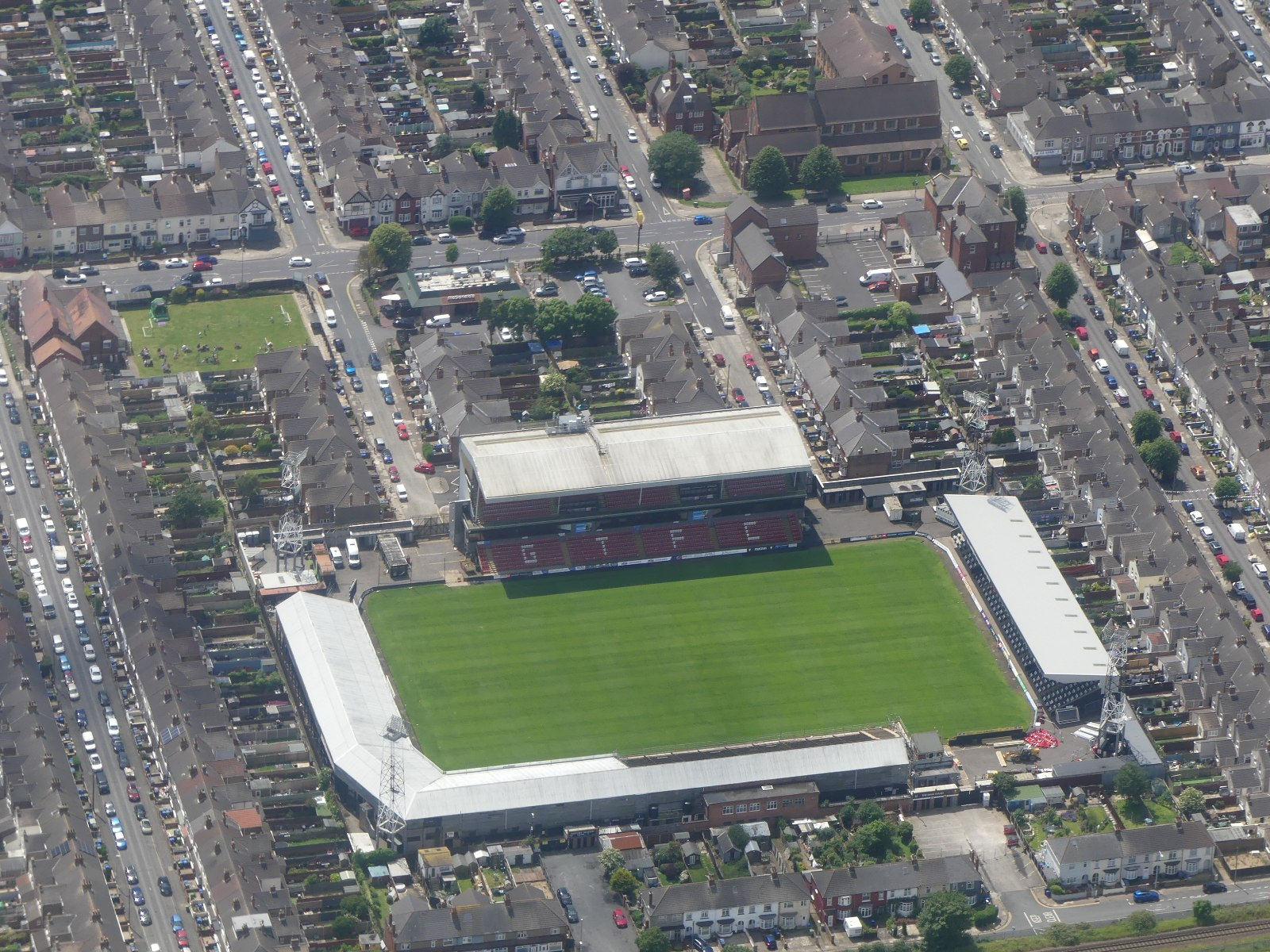
Blundell Park the home ground of Grimsby Town F.C.

Musical entertainment is provided at the Grimsby Auditorium, built in 1995 in Cromwell Road, Yarborough, near Grimsby Leisure Centre. The smaller Caxton Theatre is in Cleethorpe Road (A180) in East Marsh, near the docks. The Caxton Theatre provides entertainment by adults and youths in theatre. Notable in the area is the Class Act Theatre Company run by the local playwright David Wrightam.

North East Lincolnshire Council has installed a Wi-Fi network covering Victoria Street in central Grimsby. The service gives access to the Internet to the general public on a yearly subscription.

Grimsby's Freeman Street cinema closed in 2004, leaving the Parkway cinema in Cleethorpes to serve the town. Periodic plans to build a new cinema in Grimsby have been made since. The Whitgift Film Theatre in John Whitgift Academy shows a programme of limited release and art-house films.

=== Places of interest and landmarks ===
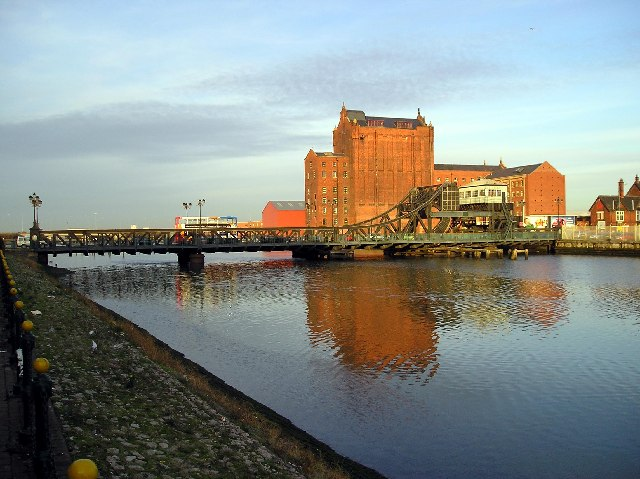
Corporation Bridge in foreground with Victoria Mill in background

- Corporation Bridge
- Fisherman's Memorial
- Grimsby Crematorium
- Grimsby Docks
- Grimsby Dock Tower
- Grimsby Ice Factory – built in 1898–1901 to provide crushed ice to preserve fish stored in ships at Grimsby's seaport
- Grimsby Institute
- Grimsby Minster
- Grimsby Town Hall
- Humber Forts
- Grimsby Fishing Heritage Centre
- People's Park
- Scartho Road Cemetery
- Waltham Windmill
- Weelsby Woods

Grimsby is the site of a Blue Cross Animal Hospital, one of only four in the country, the other three being in London. Previously on Cleethorpe Road, the Grimsby hospital moved in 2005 to a new building, Coco Markus House, on Nelson Street.

=== Media ===
==== Newspaper ====
The Grimsby Telegraph, had an audited circulation of 14,344 copies in 2017. It is based in Heritage House near the Fishing Heritage Centre.

==== Radio ====
The local radio stations are BBC Radio Humberside, Hits Radio Lincolnshire, Hits Radio East Yorkshire & North Lincolnshire and Greatest Hits Radio Yorkshire. The transmitter for Greatest Hits Radio and Bauer Humberside is on top of a block of flats in East Marsh.

==== Television ====
Terrestrial television coverage based in the area comes from BBC Yorkshire and Lincolnshire and ITV Yorkshire, which has a news broadcast based in Immingham. That's TV Humberside (formerly Estuary TV and Channel 7 Television) broadcast on Freeview channel 8 and on Virgin Media channel 159.

=== Popular culture ===
- Bernie Taupin, who lived in Owmby-by-Spital and later Tealby (both near Market Rasen) when in his teens, wrote the lyrics to Elton John's 1974 song, "Grimsby", which is included in John's album Caribou.
- The town has featured as a film location: Scartho Hospital (now Diana, Princess of Wales Hospital), and the Scartho Road Cemetery entrance, were used in the 1985 film Clockwise. The 2006 film, This Is England was partly set and filmed in Grimsby and other East Midland locations such as Nottingham.
- Grimsby is an action-comedy film starring Sacha Baron Cohen and Mark Strong, released by Columbia Pictures in February 2016. No scenes for it were actually shot in the town; they were filmed instead in Tilbury, Essex.
- The town was the setting for a second series of the Channel 4 documentary Skint in 2014, following families and individuals undergoing the "devastating effects of long-term unemployment".
- The CiTV animated series The Rubbish World of Dave Spud takes place in a fictionalised version of Grimsby. The tower block the Spud family live in was modelled after the former high-rise flats on East Marsh.

== Notable people ==
Listed in alphabetical order (Grimbarians were mainly born at the former Grimsby Maternity Hospital in Nunsthorpe, Grimsby. Many were born at the defunct Croft Baker Maternity Hospital in nearby Cleethorpes. Those born and/or brought up nearby include:

- Herbert Ayre (1882–1966), footballer
- Jane Andrews (born 1967), English former royal dresser for Sarah Ferguson and murderer
- Clarrie Bacon (1889–1954), footballer
- Richard Bennett (born 1954), a cricketer who played for New Zealand
- Shirley Bloomer (born 1934), winner of the French Open Singles and Doubles titles in 1957 and the French Open Mixed title in 1958
- Jack Braughton (1921–2016), a long-distance runner who represented Britain in the Olympics
- Bill Brewster, writer and disc jockey
- Dennis Brown (born 1951), Professor of Medicine at Harvard Medical School, and President of the American Physiological Society
- Richard Buck (born 1986), a sprinter in the 400 meters event, represented Britain in the World and European Championships.
- Maxine Carr (born 1977), teaching assistant and partner of Ian Huntley, convicted of perverting the course of justice in the Soham murders case
- Stuart Carrington (born 1990), snooker player
- Joanne Clifton (born 1983), professional dancer on the BBC's Strictly Come Dancing as of 2014
- Kevin Clifton (born 1982), professional dancer on the BBC's Strictly Come Dancing alongside his sister Joanne (above)
- Holly Clyburn (born 1991), professional golfer, plays on the Ladies European Tour. Winning member of Great Britain Curtis Cup team of 2012
- Richard P. Cook (born 1949), artist
- Quentin Cooper (born 1961), presenter of Radio 4's Material World and film correspondent for BBC Radio 2, grew up in the town, attending Wintringham School.
- Patrick Cormack (born 1939), Conservative politician and MP, later the life peer Baron Cormack
- Peter Crampton (born 1969), Olympic 400 metres hurdles runner for Great Britain
- Peter "Mars" Cowling (1946–2018), longstanding bass player in the Pat Travers Band
- Steve Currie (1947–1981), bass player and long-term member of the English glam rock band T. Rex
- Keeley Donovan (born 1983), weather presenter for BBC North
- Michele Dotrice (born 1948), actor playing Betty Spencer in the 1970s comedy Some Mothers Do 'Ave 'Em
- Arthur Drewry (1891–1961), football administrator and businessman, chaired Grimsby Town F.C., and later the Football League, the Football Association and FIFA.
- Kevin Drinkell (born 1960), football manager and former player for Grimsby Town, Rangers and Norwich City
- Ray Edmonds (born 1936), professional billiards player, was the World Professional Billiards Champion of 1985.
- John Fenty (born 1961), owner of Grimsby Town Football Club and local councillor
- Brenda Fisher (1927–2022), cross-Channel and long-distance swimmer
- Helen Fospero (born 1966), newsreader for Sky News and Five News
- Tony Ford (born 1959), footballer holding the all-time record for matches played in the English league by an outfield player, notably for Grimsby Town, Stoke City and West Bromwich Albion
- Lee Freeman (born 1969), Chief Constable of Humberside Police 2017–2023
- Freddie Frinton (1909–1968), comedian, actor in the 1960s BBC comedy Meet the Wife
- Freddie Frith (1909–1988), former Grand Prix motorcycle racing world champion
- Lisa George (born 1970), actress, Coronation Street, Emmerdale and contestant on Dancing on Ice
- Phil Gladwin (born 1963), television screenwriter, Warriors of Kudlak
- Phil Glew (born 1983), racing driver in British Touring Car Championship, now commentator for ITV Sport.
- Lloyd Griffith (born 1983), comedian and television presenter, Soccer AM
- Edmund de Grimsby, judge and clergyman, was born in Grimsby and probably died here in 1354.
- Frederick Hans Haagensen (1877–1943), artist
- Dan Haigh (born 1980), bass guitarist in rock group Fightstar, and co-founder of synth-wave trio Gunship, was born and brought up in the town.
- Mike Hallett (born 1959), snooker player and commentator for Sky Sports
- Kate Haywood (born 1987), a swimmer who competed for Britain and Olympics and England at the Commonwealth level
- Duncan Heath (born 1981), first-class cricketer
- John Heath (born 1978), first-class cricketer
- Patricia Hodge (born 1946), actor: Miranda, Rumpole of the Bailey and Jemima Shore Investigates. Her parents managed the Royal Hotel in the town. She attended Wintringham School.
- Ian Huntley (1974–2026), Soham double child murderer, was born at Grimsby and lived there until the late 1990s.
- Alfred Hurst (1846–1915), member of the Iowa House of Representatives
- Naomi Isted (born 1979), fashion and beauty journalist and presenter
- Keith Jobling (1934–2020), professional footballer with 450 games for Grimsby Town
- Guy Martin (born 1981), motorcycle racer turned television presenter
- Madge Kendal, also known as Margaret Shaftoe Grimston nee Robertson (1848–1935), was a stage and radio actress. Dame Kendal Grove, in Nunsthorpe, is named after her.
- Matt Kennard (born 1982), television actor, starred in the UK daytime drama Doctors, as nurse Archie Hallam.
- Glenn Kirkham, (born 1982), field hockey player for England and Great Britain Olympic team
- Duncan McKenzie (born 1950), footballer with Nottingham Forest, Leeds United and Everton
- Robert Kyle (1913–2010), American football and Baseball player and coach, notably a quarterback for West Virginia University
- Amy Monkhouse (born 1979), lawn bowler
- Darren Pattinson (born 1978), England Test cricketer born in Grimsby
- Michael Pearce (born 1965), an artist born in Grimsby
- Julie Peasgood (born 1956), actor, Fran in the soap opera Brookside, grew up in Grimsby and attended Wintringham School.
- Dean Reynolds (born 1963), snooker player
- Paul Robinson aka LUAP (born 1982), contemporary Artist known for his depiction of the Pink Bear
- Matija Sarkic (1997–2024), footballer, Premier League goalkeeper, international for Montenegro
- Kiera Skeels (born 2001), footballer for Charlton Athletic
- David Smith (born 1974), Great Britain Olympic hammer thrower
- Matthew Stiff (born 1979), opera singer
- Emily Syme (born 2000), footballer for Bristol City
- Rod Temperton (1949–2016), songwriter, record producer and musician. Born and raised in Cleethorpes, worked as a fish filleter at Ross Frozen Foods, Grimsby, prior to success.
- Thomas Turgoose (born 1992), actor notably in This is England and Game of Thrones
- David Tarttelin (born 1929), painter
- Ivy Wallace (1915–2006), children's writer and artist
- John Whitgift (1530–1604), Archbishop of Canterbury under Queen Elizabeth I
- Tom Wintringham (1898–1949), communist politician and military historian
- Patrick Wymark (1926–1970), actor. Wymark View was named after him.

People with Grimsby connections:

- Hollie Arnold (born 1994), Paralympic athlete who won Gold in the F46 javelin at the 2016 games. Was a contestant on I'm a Celebrity...Get Me Out of Here!. She grew up in the neighbouring village of Holton-le-Clay.
- Harold Gosney (born 1937), artist and sculptor, taught at Grimsby School of Art 1960–1992 and created sculptures sited around Grimsby.
- Ella Henderson (born 1996), singer, songwriter and former contestant on The X Factor. Was born in a neighbouring village Tetney and went to school in Grimsby.
- John Hurt (1940–2017), actor, spent his formative years in the town while his father was a priest at St Aidan's, Cleethorpes.
- Norman Lamont (born 1942), Conservative MP and former Chancellor of the Exchequer, was brought up in the town.
- James Paul Moody (1887–1912), merchant sailor and sixth officer of RMS Titanic, lived in the town with his brother for the last few years of his life. His family historical hailed from Grimsby. Died in the sinking.
- Andrew Osmond (1938–1999), Diplomat and co-founder of Private Eye grew up in neighbouring village of Barnoldby-le-Beck
- David Ross (born 1965), businessman, co-founder of Carphone Warehouse was brought up in the town.
- Ernest Worrall (1898–1972), painter known for depicting Grimsby in the Second World War, lived there from 1932 until the 1960s.

== Twin cities ==
Grimsby's twin cities include:

- Tromsø, Norway, since 1961
- Bremerhaven, Germany, since February 1963
- Banjul, The Gambia
- Dieppe, France
- Akureyri, Iceland. In 2007, a friendship and fisheries agreement was signed with Akureyri which according to Ice News, might lead to a twin cities designation in the future.

As a port with trading ties to Continental Europe, the Nordic nations and Baltic Europe, the townhouses honorary consulates of Denmark, Iceland, and Norway. Swedish and Finnish honorary consulates are located in Immingham, and that of Germany at Barrow-upon-Humber.

The people of Norway have sent a tree to the town of Grimsby every Christmas since the end of the Second World War. The Norwegian city of Trondheim sent a tree for 40 years until 2003, since when the tree has been donated by the northern Norwegian town of Sortland and placed in the town's Riverhead Square. During redevelopment of Riverhead Square the tree has been placed in the Old Market Place since 2013.

== See also ==
- Grimsby-class sloops, in service from the 1930s until 1966.
- St Mary's Church, Grimsby
- List of mayors of Grimsby
