= The Barge Inn =

Pub in Grimsby, Lincolnshire, England

Coordinates: 53.5663°N 0.08319°W

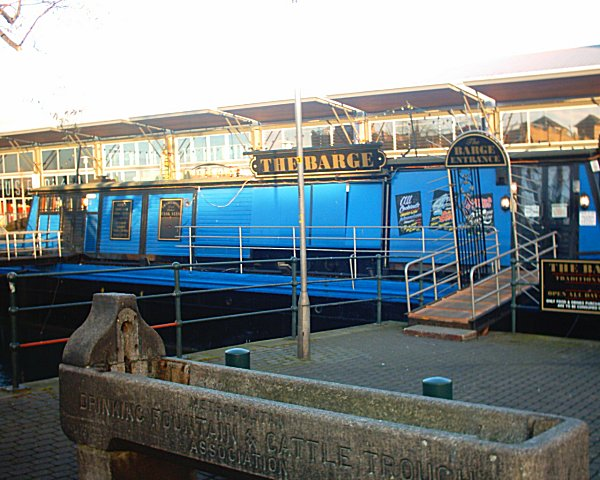

The Barge Inn is an independent public house and restaurant in Grimsby, North East Lincolnshire, Lincolnshire, England. Housed within a refitted former grain barge, it has been moored in the town centre Riverhead quay since 1982.

== History ==
The Barge was crane lifted into Grimsby's Riverhead quay from the adjacent Alexandra Dock in 1982. A former grain barge, it was converted into a public house and has since remained permanently moored in this position. It is moored with a distinctive tilt to its starboard side.

In 2017, the establishment was threatened with removal to accommodate North East Lincolnshire Council plans to build a cinema complex in Grimsby town centre. A petition to save the Barge attracted almost 8,500 signatures, and it was subsequently announced that it would be remaining in its current position.
