= Little Coates =

Area of Grimsby, England

Coordinates: 53.559073°N 0.119873°W

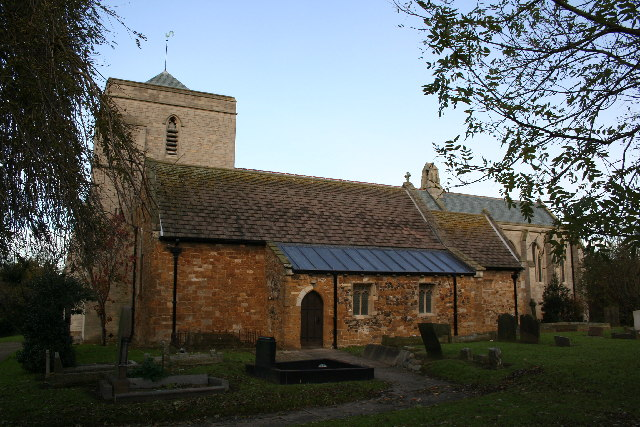
- St Michael's Church, Little Coates

- Location within Lincolnshire
- OS grid reference: TA246085
  - London: 145 mi (233 km) S
- Unitary authority: North East Lincolnshire
- Ceremonial county: Lincolnshire
- Region: Yorkshire and the Humber
- Country: England
- Sovereign state: United Kingdom
- Post town: Grimsby
- Postcode district: DN34
- Police: Humberside
- Fire: Humberside
- Ambulance: East Midlands
- UK Parliament: Great Grimsby and Cleethorpes

Little Coates is an area of western Grimsby, in the North East Lincolnshire, in the ceremonial county of Lincolnshire, England. It is in the Yarborough ward of the North East Lincolnshire Council.

== History ==
Little Coates was already inhabited at the time of the Norman Conquest. By 1861 it had a population of 59 and consisted of Saint Michael's church (later rebuilt by Sir Walter Tapper in 1915) and a few cottages. There was also a farm on the site where now stands the recreation ground and golf course.

Situated just within the parish, near present-day Chelmsford Avenue and Westhill Road, were natural water springs. Waterworks were established here in 1863 by the Great Grimsby Waterworks Company. Supplies were pumped from the springs to homes in neighbouring Grimsby via a reservoir at Scartho. Today the site is owned by Anglian Water.

By 1901 the population had reached 83. In the northern corner of the parish fish curing houses were erected. Dixons paper mill opened in 1906 – population increased as houses were built in the vicinity of the mill, with a community established in the Gilbey Road area. The mill closed in 1973. Little Coates school was opened in Harlow Street, and is still functioning. In 1921 Little Coates' population was 2,768.

From 1974 to 1996 it was in the county of Humberside. Until 1996 it was in Great Grimsby district.

== Geography ==
Previously a separate civil parish covering 1,000 acres (400 hectares), Little Coates stretches northward to the Pyewipe industrial estate, westward to the River Freshney and southward to Laceby Road (A46). On the other side of the river is the parish of Great Coates and the Willows/Wybers Wood estates, while to the south lies the parish of Bradley.

On 1 April 1928 Little Coates ceased to exist as a separate civil parish when much of it was absorbed to form Grimsby, with a small part being allocated to Great Coates. Before amalgamation the boundary with Grimsby ran along Pyewipe Road. To the east of this line, within Grimsby, were Corporation Road, Armstrong Street and the rest of the West Marsh. On the Little Coates side were Gilbey Road, Elsenham Road and neighbouring streets. The boundary continued southward along the western side of, but excluded, Boulevard Avenue, and took in the Yarborough Road area, parts of Marklew Avenue, Marshall Avenue and Morton Road. It then ran along the eastern edges of, and included, Shaftesbury Avenue, Clifton Road, Richmond Road, Kingston Avenue, the Waterworks Cottages, Cambridge Park estate, Sherwood Road and Watford Avenue, finishing at Laceby Road just west of modern-day Saint Mark's Church.

== Community ==
The ecclesiastical parish of Little Coates is based at the parish church of Saint Michael on Great Coates Road. It cooperates with Great Coates and Bradley village churches, and serves approximately 20,000 people at the western side of the town. The Littlecoates Community Centre on Saint Michaels Road, Yarborough Community Centre on Yarrow Road, and the Yarborough Resource Centre on Central Parade, provide social activities for residents.

Before 2008 community magazines were produced for the Little Coates area – they ceased publication through lack of funding. The Riverside magazine was distributed to the Gilbey Road area (part of West Marsh), Toothill and Roundabout to the Toothill and Yarborough Road area, and Livewire to the Crowland Avenue, Bradley Cross Roads and Laceby Acres areas.

Kingston Gardens is situated in the Waterworks Cottages area. The gardens include a pond and eight acres of woodland. A local residents' group, Friends of Kingston Gardens, improve and maintain the site.

There are two police stations: the Cromwell Road station serves the West Marsh, Yarborough Road, Saint Michaels Road and Laceby Acres, and the station on Laceby Road serves the Crowland estate. On Cromwell Road is a fire station. The only public library in the area was closed in 2004.

Riverside Children's Centre, on Central Parade, provides services for parents with children under the age of five. Broadway Children's Centre provides activities for under fives. On Cromwell Road is the Cromwell Road Resource Centre, which caters for people with complex needs.

There are tenant and resident associations in the Crowland Avenue, Saint Michaels Road, Laceby Acres and Yarborough Road areas. In 2005, following a ballot of tenants, council houses on the Crowland, Littlecoates and Yarborough estates were transferred to the Shoreline Housing Partnership. The Yarborough Estate, built during the 1950s, is being demolished to be replaced by modern housing, in a joint project between Shoreline and Stamford Homes. The Estate's name has been changed to Freshney Green. and 440 new homes will be built. The project includes community facilities, including a health centre at Central Parade, with GP, dental, pharmacy and mental health provision.

Grimsby Golf Course, Capes Recreation Ground, The Humber Royal Hotel on Littlecoates Road, Grimsby Auditorium, Grimsby Leisure Centre on Cromwell Road, and part of the Freshney Parkway recreation area are within Little Coates.
