= Sir John Nelthorpe School =

Secondary school and sixth form in North Lincolnshire, England

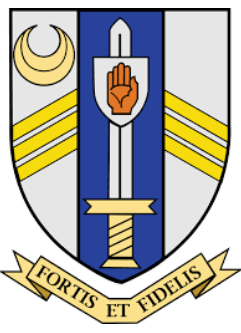

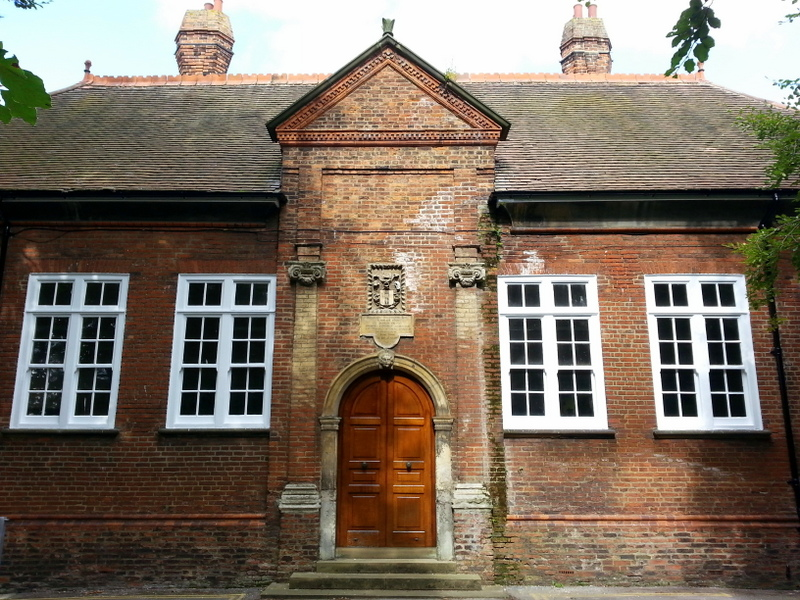
- Front view of Sir John Nelthorpe School

Location
- Grammar School Road; Brigg, Lincolnshire, DN20 8AA; England; 53°33′16″N 0°29′22″W

Information
- Type: Voluntary controlled comprehensive
- Motto: Latin: Fortis et Fidelis (Strong and Faithful)
- Established: 1669; 357 years ago
- Founder: Sir John Nelthorpe
- Local authority: North Lincolnshire
- Department for Education URN: 118112 Tables
- Ofsted: Reports
- Head teacher: Robert Biglands
- Gender: Coeducational
- Age: 11 to 18
- Enrolment: 870
- Chair of Governors: E Wells
- Website: http://www.sirjohnnelthorpe.co.uk

The Sir John Nelthorpe School is a secondary school and sixth form on Grammar School Road and Wrawby Road in Brigg, North Lincolnshire, England. The present school was established in 1976, and has a timeline through earlier schools to that established by Sir John Nelthorpe in 1669.

== History ==
=== Grammar school ===
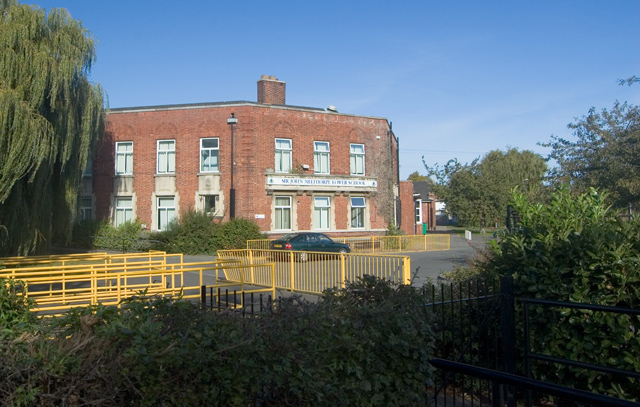
Sir John Nelthorpe Lower School

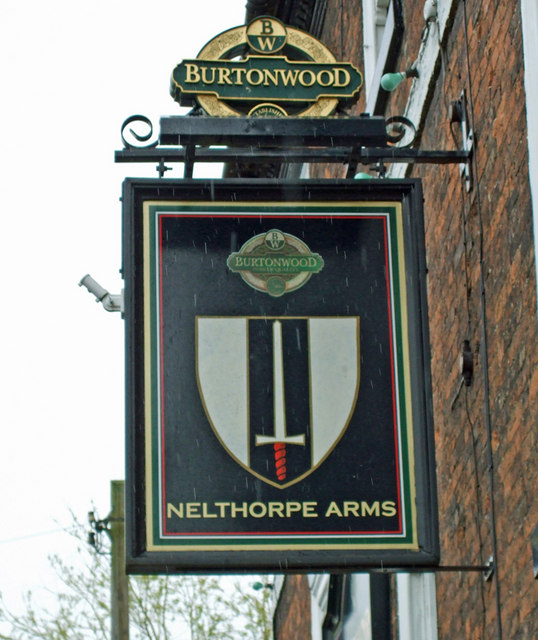
The Sign of the Nelthorpe Arms

The school, also referred to as SJN, was formed as a grammar school in 1669 by Sir John Nelthorpe, who was born in Brigg in 1614. He was unmarried and wanted his wealth from his estate across Lincolnshire to create a school in his name. The buildings were opened around 1680, and the Upper School Library dates from this time. New buildings were added in 1879, and the Nelthorpe family have retained strong links with the school.

The grammar school in the 1970s had around 350 boys. Brigg Girls' High School, on Wrawby Road, had around 250 girls, and became the lower school. These schools were administered until 1974 by the Lindsey Education Committee, based in Lincoln.

=== Comprehensive ===
The school became a co-educational comprehensive in 1976.

Building improvements have included a new canteen, refurbishment of the drama hall and science labs, redecoration of English classrooms and improved security. The school was one of two in Humberside LEA that had a boarding house; Bridlington School (a former grammar school) was the other. Since 1996 it has been administered by North Lincolnshire; the LEA's offices are also in Brigg.

== Curriculum ==
The school shares the sixth form, known as the Brigg Sixth Form, with the town's other comprehensive school, The Vale Academy.

School expeditions were made to Malawi in 2012, and India in 2014. The school took part in a Great War research project supported by the Heritage Lottery Fund.

== Inspections ==
In 2014 Ofsted rated the school Grade 2 "Good" for overall effectiveness, following a 2013 report of Grade 3 "Requires Improvement", and 2011, 2009 and 2006 of Grade 3 "Satisfactory".

== Admissions ==
The school is for ages 11 to 18. The Lower School is on Wrawby Road and the Upper School is on Grammar School Road.

== Partner schools ==
Since 1996, it has had a partnership with the Gymnasium Leoninum in Handrup, Lower Saxony (Niedersachsen) in Germany.

== Notable alumni ==
=== Brigg Grammar School ===
- William Eric Grasar (1924–31), Roman Catholic Bishop of Shrewsbury 1962–80
- Eric Waldram Kemp (1926–33), Bishop of Chichester 1974–2001
- Kenneth Jones (1932–9), barrister and High Court Judge (died 2004), who prosecuted the Kray Twins
- John Pimlott (1959–66), military historian
- Alexander Trees, Baron Trees, Professor of veterinary parasitology and Crossbench member of the House of Lords

=== Sir John Nelthorpe School ===
- Duncan Heath, first-class cricketer
- John Heath, first-class cricketer
- John Osbourne, writer and broadcaster
- Matt Sparrow, footballer
- David Yelland (1976–81), editor of The Sun from 1998 to 2003
- Holly Mumby-Croft, British Conservative Party politician, Member of Parliament (MP) for Scunthorpe (2019–2024)

=== Brigg Girls' High School ===
- Sylvia Jackson (1958–65), Labour MSP for Stirling from 1999 to 2007
- Carmel McCourt, singer
