= Naomi Isted =

British fashion and beauty television presenter

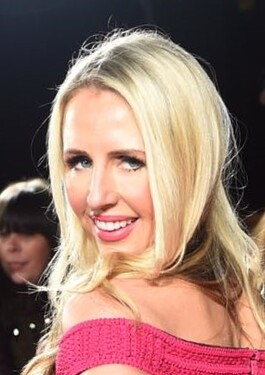
- Isted, in 2016
- Born: 23 February 1979 (age 47); Grimsby, Lincolnshire, UK
- Occupations: Television Presenter, Columnist, Blogger, Fashion and Beauty Expert
- Spouse: Haydn Isted (2009–present)
- Children: 2
- Website: naomikisted.com

Naomi Isted (born 23 February 1979) is a British fashion and beauty television presenter, columnist and blogger.

Born in Grimsby, she trained in fashion journalism at London Journalism Centre in 2014. Isted is a fashion columnist for the Herald Scotland, and beauty blogger for HELLO Magazine.

She presented the TV series Harley Street Beauty on Wedding TV in the UK. and has recently been presenting Lifestyle segments on ITV's Good Morning Britain.

Isted collaborated with the Evening Standard for London Fashion Week 2016 and writes an online fashion column for the Evening Standard

In 2016 Isted styled the publicity campaign for the Westend Musical Dreamgirls at the Savoy Theatre, London.

Isted has filmed various red carpets and fashion segments over the years for E!

In 2017 Isted was a guest expert at Beaches Resorts Brunch in collaboration with Absolute Mama Magazine.

Isted was a brand ambassador in 2014 for Pears Soap UK In July 2014 Isted presented the Orideja 2014 Fashion shapewear campaign.

Isted was appointed as a brand ambassador in 2025 for leading Door Retailer Doors 2 Floors www.doors2floors.co.uk

== Personal life ==
She married Haydn Isted in 2009, and the couple have two children, Rocco Isted and Fleur Isted. She also has two stepchildren from her husband's previous marriage to Louise Adams (Sister of Victoria Beckham).
