= West Marsh =

Area of Grimsby, Lincolnshire, England

Coordinates: 53.571°N 0.091°W

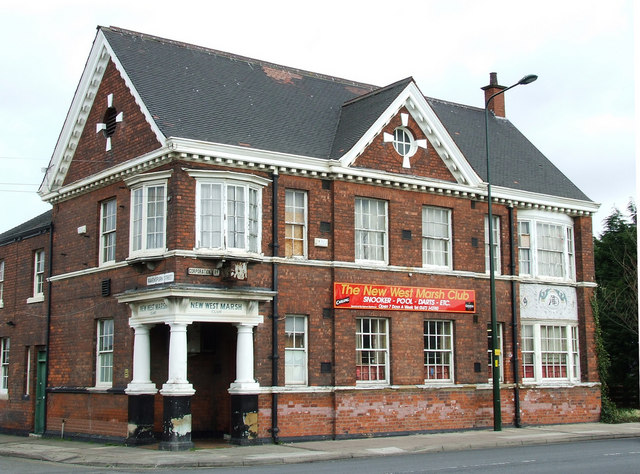
- Club on Corporation Road, West Marsh

- Location within Lincolnshire
- Population: 7,543 (ward 2021)
- OS grid reference: TA265099
  - London: 145 mi (233 km) S
- Unitary authority: North East Lincolnshire
- Ceremonial county: Lincolnshire
- Region: Yorkshire and the Humber
- Country: England
- Sovereign state: United Kingdom
- Post town: Grimsby
- Postcode district: DN31
- Police: Humberside
- Fire: Humberside
- Ambulance: East Midlands
- UK Parliament: Great Grimsby and Cleethorpes

West Marsh is a suburban area of Grimsby, North East Lincolnshire, England, close to Grimsby town centre. Its northern and eastern boundaries are formed by the Alexandra Dock. At its western edge is the Pyewipe industrial area, and at the south the railway line and Cromwell Road. The area is split centrally by the southeast–northwest flow of the River Freshney. West Marsh is also the name of an electoral ward of North East Lincolnshire Council. The ward covers a wider area, which includes the town centre. The population of the ward taken at the 2021 census was 7,543. The 2011 census figure was 7,754.

== History ==
For centuries the boundary between Grimsby's West Marsh and the parish of Little Coates lay roughly along the line formed by present-day Pywipe Road and Boulevard Avenue. The West Marsh was used as common land, however around 1514 this land was subject to an act of enclosure and these common rights were curtailed as the area was divided between local dignitaries.

In 1873 a bridge was built across the Old Dock, linking Corporation Road with Victoria Street. The Corporation Bridge shortened the travelling distance between the West Marsh and the built-up area in the East Marsh, including the new Freeman Street market. Previously travellers had to make a long detour through the town centre. This improved access made it more feasible for the council to lease land in the West Marsh and a programme of house building was started there.

Also in 1873 work began to improve the Old Dock and connect it with the newer Royal Dock. West Marsh land was used for this purpose. In 1879 the Union Dock, the canal linking the two docks, was opened by the Prince and Princess of Wales. The extended Old Dock became the Alexandra Dock. Vessels brought timber from Russia and Scandinavia and timber companies erected extensive storage yards in the West Marsh, next to the Alexandra Dock.

The Grimsby District Hospital was opened on the West Marsh in 1877. This hospital was demolished during the 1980s and replaced by a new hospital in Scartho Road. In 1879 the foundation stone of South Parade School, was laid and the following year the school began admitting pupils. A second school was established in Macaulay Street during 1880 and the Duke of York Gardens were officially opened in 1894. In 1911 schoolboys, demanding better conditions, went on strike and demonstrated on the streets of the West Marsh.

In 1912 the Grimsby & Immingham Electric Railway was established. From a terminus near The Corporation Bridge, the route ran to Immingham via Corporation Road and Gilbey Road. In 1928 Little Coates was absorbed by Grimsby, thereby bringing Gilbey Road, Elsenham Road and nearby streets within the borough boundary. These became part of the West Marsh community. During the late 1940s annual parades were held, with a procession of carts and lorries, one specially decorated for the West Marsh beauty queen. In 1956 the last tram ran from Corporation Bridge, however a bus route continued to serve the area. Buses only however run through the ward and not between community centres, which can be hard to access. At night, and on Sundays and Bank Holidays no buses run.

== Community ==
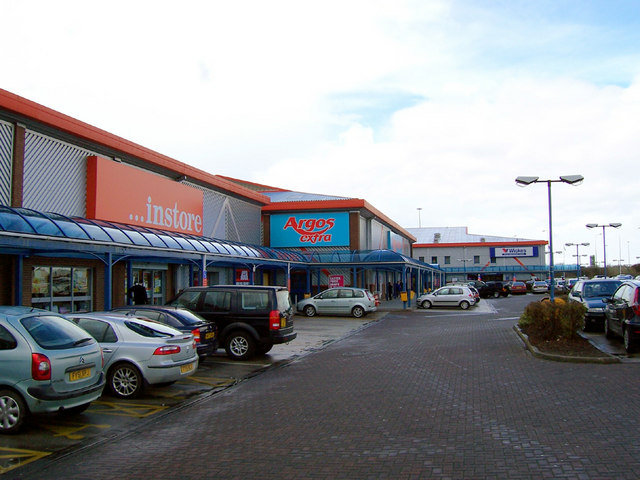
Alexandra Dock Retail Park

West Marsh includes the National Fishing Heritage Centre, the Alexandra Retail Park, Alexandra Dock Business Centre and West Marsh Industrial Estate.

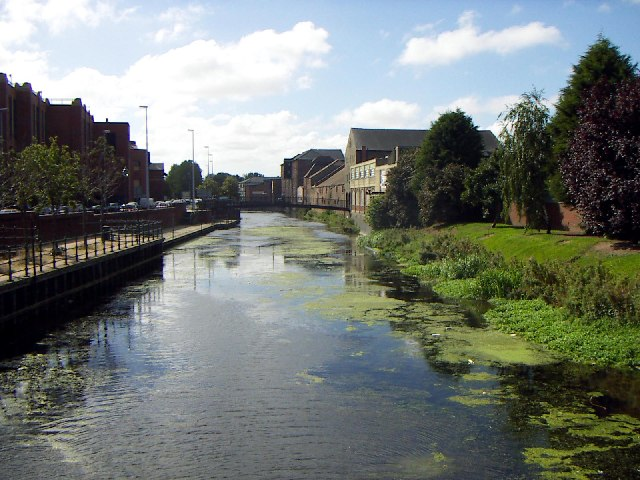
River Freshney at the southeast of West Marsh

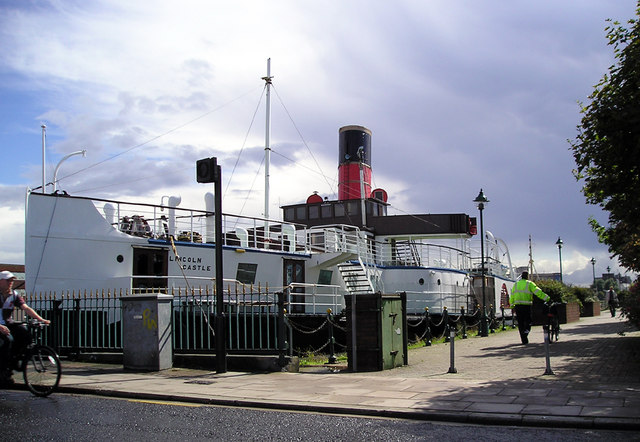
Lincoln Castle passenger ferry in Alexandra Dock

The River Freshney runs through the centre of the West Marsh. Situated on its north bank, off Corporation Road, are the Duke of York Gardens. Installed in the gardens is the anchor of the now scrapped Lincoln Castle passenger ferry that was previously moored in Alexandra Dock.

The West Marsh Community Centre, on Beeson Street to the north of the River Freshney and opened in 1999, is a community building providing activities including football for young people, dance classes and adult education courses. The gardens at the Community Centre contain a memorial cross to those killed in the First World War. St Hugh's and MAAG Hall Community Centres are on the south side of the river in the West Marsh Macaulay area.

Social activities are organised by the West Marsh and St Hugh's community centres, and the Macaulay Area Action Group (MAAG) on Haycroft Avenue. MAAG has published a booklet about the history of the southern part of the West Marsh, between the River Freshney and Cromwell Road. This follows an earlier publication that dealt with the area north of the river. West Marsh Forward is a group, involving residents, which was established to bring funding from the Neighbourhood Renewal Fund (NRF) to projects in the area. Although NRF funding has been withdrawn, the Forward continues as a focus for the area. Grimsby in Bloom now operate from the old bowling green pavilion on the Duke of York Gardens.

There was a quarterly community magazine from 2002 to 2008 called Riverside produced and published by The Community Press Office Ltd and distributed free to 5,000 homes in the West Marsh area. A smaller magazine called East Meets West then served both the East and West Marsh for several years but then stopped. The Friends of the Freshney was set up in 2004, and holds litter-picks and other events to help improve the park and river. It has largely been dormant since the Covid pandemic.

Churches within the West Marsh area are St Hugh's (Church of England) on Haycroft Street and Haven Methodists and Christadelphians on Lord Street The Congregationalists also had a presence in the West Marsh and there was a Scandinavian church in Chapman Street.

== Education ==
Education is provided by Macaulay Infants & Junior School, South Parade Infants & Junior School; and Littlecoates Primary School on Harlow Street – a booklet, A Short history of Littlecoates School, has been produced.
