= Kenneth Jones (judge) =

British judge

Sir Kenneth George Illtyd Jones (26 May 1921 – 12 July 2004) was a British barrister and High Court judge. As a barrister, he was best known for his successful prosecution of the Kray twins and nine others in two trials in the 1960s.

Born in Radyr, Cardiff, the son of Richard Arthur Jones and Olive Jane Jones, Kenneth Jones was educated at Brigg Grammar School and University College, Oxford, where he was Treasurer of the Oxford Union in 1941. His time at university was interrupted by service in the Second World War: he served in the 76th (Shropshire Yeomanry) Medium Regiment, Royal Artillery, from 1942 to 1945, and ended the war as Staff Captain, Headquarters XIII Corps. He was mentioned in dispatches for his wartime service.

Jones graduated from Oxford in 1946 and was called to the English bar at Gray's Inn the same year. The pupil of Stanley Rees (later Mr Justice Rees), he became a tenant in his chambers at 1 Crown Office Row, then headed by Hildreth Glyn-Jones (later Mr Justice Glyn-Jones) and joined the Oxford circuit, on which his practice concentrated.
