= Herbert Ayre =

English footballer

Personal information
- Full name: Herbert Wilkinson Ayre
- Date of birth: 22 October 1882
- Place of birth: Grimsby, Lincolnshire, England
- Date of death: 22 November 1966 (aged 84)
- Place of death: Grimsby, Lincolnshire, England
- Position: Defender

Senior career*
Years	Team	Apps	(Gls)
- Grimsby St John's
1904	Grimsby Town	3	(0)
- * Club domestic league appearances and goals

Herbert Wilkinson Ayre (22 October 1882 – 22 November 1966) was a footballer who played in The Football League for Grimsby Town.

In 1953, he married Eileen Hotson.
