= Robert Kyle (American football) =

American football and baseball player (1913–2010)

Biographical details
- Born: September 24, 1913; Grimsby, England
- Died: June 18, 2010 (aged 96)

Playing career

Football
- 1934–1936: West Virginia

Baseball
- 1936: Greensburg Red Wings
- Position: Quarterback

Coaching career (HC unless noted)

Football
- 1948–1950: Concord

Cross country
- 1967–1969: Concord

Head coaching record
- Overall: 10–17 (football)

Robert "Killer" Kyle (September 24, 1913 – June 18, 2010) was an American football and minor league baseball player, as well as a college football and cross country coach. He served as the head football coach at Concord University in Athens, West Virginia from 1948 to 1950. A quarterback at West Virginia University, Kyle also played one season of baseball for the Greensburg Red Wings in 1936.

== Head coaching record ==
=== Football ===
Year	Team	Overall	Conference	Standing	Bowl/playoffs
Concord Mountain Lions (West Virginia Intercollegiate Athletic Conference) (1948–1950)
1948	Concord	4–5	2–4	9th	
1949	Concord	5–4	4–2	T–4th	
1950	Concord	1–8	0–6	11th	
Concord:		10–17	6–12		
Total:		10–17			
