= Stagecoach Grimsby-Cleethorpes =

Bus operator in North East Lincolnshire, England

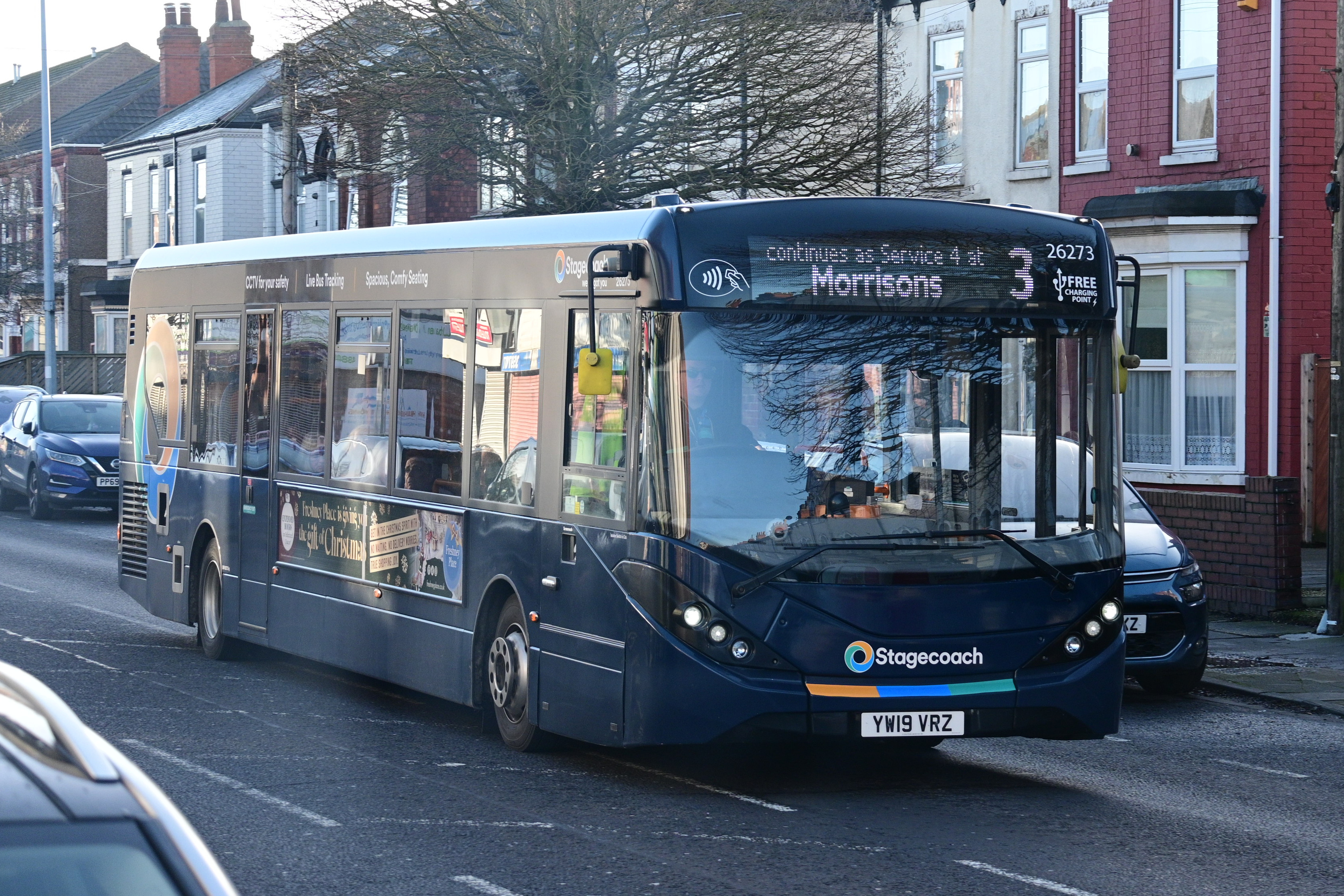
- Alexander Dennis Enviro200 MMC on Grimsby Road, Cleethorpes in December 2025
- Parent: Stagecoach Group
- Founded: November 1993; 32 years ago
- Headquarters: Grimsby, North East Lincolnshire
- Service area: Grimsby; Cleethorpes; North East Lincolnshire
- Service type: Urban and interurban bus services
- Fleet: 75 (2020)
- Website: Official website

Stagecoach Grimsby-Cleethorpes is a subdivision of Stagecoach East Midlands that operates buses in and around North East Lincolnshire, England, serving a population of over 150,000. It runs town services in its main hubs of Grimsby and Cleethorpes, as well as services to Immingham and nearby villages.

== History ==
=== Grimsby and Cleethorpes Corporations ===
In 1881 the London-based Provincial Tramways Company established a system of horse trams in Grimsby and Cleethorpes under the management of the Great Grimsby Street Tramways Company. Provincial also operated tramways in Cardiff, Portsmouth, Gosport and Plymouth. These horse trams would be withdrawn in 1901 and replaced with electric trams.

In 1925 Grimsby Corporation bought the tramway system running within its borough for £125,000. However, faced with the expense of relaying damaged track on Freeman Street, the new company acquired single deck Garrett and later double deck AEC trolleybuses, with trolleybus services first operating on 3 October 1926. This started the gradual process of replacing the ageing trams with the Grimsby trolleybus system.

In 1927, Grimsby Corporation Transport bought its first motor buses, these being centre entrance single deck Albions. The first double deck motor bus, an AEC Regent with a centre entrance, was purchased in 1930. Grimsby Corporation introduced motor bus routes to outlying areas of the town and in 1934 bought routes from the Ada bus company and Provincial, thereby extending services to New Waltham/Humberston (route 8) and Waltham (route 9). Following World War Two, routes were further extended to the new housing estates.

Cleethorpes Council introduced motor buses in 1930, operating routes within the town and also to Humberston. A joint service with Grimsby (route 6) ran from Grimsby town centre, along Bargate, Weelsby Road and Clee Road to Cleethorpes Bathing Pool. In 1936 Cleethorpes took over the tramways within its area and in 1937 tram services run by the two boroughs finally ended, when a second joint service (route 11) was established along the main road between Grimsby Old Market Place and Cleethorpes Bathing Pool using trolley buses.

=== Grimsby-Cleethorpes Transport (GCT) ===
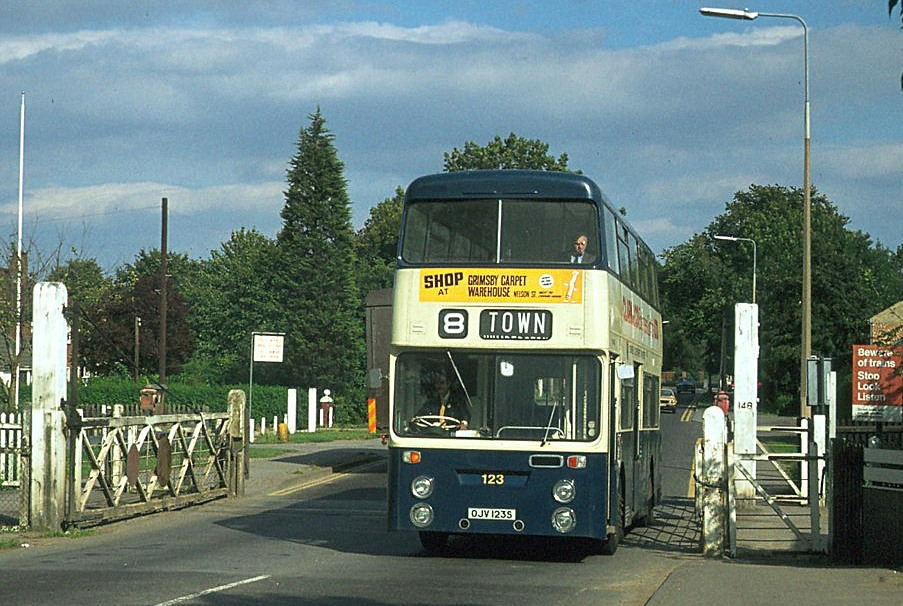
Grimsby-Cleethorpes Transport Leyland Fleetline in New Waltham in 1978

In 1953, plans to amalgamate both Grimsby and Cleethorpes' transport departments were first explored. However, Cleethorpes' department's managing director was initially opposed to the plan, and so discussions continued until an agreement was made in 1957. Both councils then merged their bus companies to form Grimsby-Cleethorpes Transport (GCT), run by a joint committee. The crimson/cream livery of Grimsby and the blue/grey colours of Cleethorpes were replaced with the blue and cream of the new company. The Cleethorpes depot at Pelham Road was closed down, the buses and staff moving to the Grimsby depot in Victoria Street.

Prior to the amalgamation in 1956, Grimsby introduced its first one-person operated service on its Corporation Road route 1, using new dual entrance single deckers. The last trolleybuses were taken out of service in 1960. During the 1960s the first rear-engined Daimler Fleetline double deckers arrived. These had the driver inside, with automatic doors opposite where they sat. Later dual-door Fleetlines were acquired and these were used to gradually extend the one-person operated bus system to the double deck routes. On 4 July 1982, the role of conductor was abolished and Grimsby-Cleethorpes Transport changed entirely to one-person operation.

1981 saw GCT change its livery to caramel and cream. In 1986 bus services were deregulated, which resulted in some competition between RoadCar and GCT. RoadCar began running buses from Grimsby town centre to the Grange, Nunsthorpe and Bradley Park estates, areas previously served only by GCT. In 1987 the fleet colours were changed again, to orange and white.

=== Stagecoach ownership ===
Following the rejection of an employee buyout in 1990, it was agreed in 1993 between the Grimsby and Cleethorpes councils that, resulting from government policy that municipal transport undertakings should be privatised, Grimsby-Cleethorpes Transport would be sold into private ownership. Bids submitted included offers from Caldaire Holdings, East Yorkshire Motor Services, Southern National, Stagecoach Holdings, the Wellglade Group and Yorkshire Rider. The Stagecoach bid was accepted and in November 1993, Grimsby-Cleethorpes Transport was purchased by Stagecoach Holdings for £4.7 million (equivalent to £12,093,000 in 2023). The company was soon rebranded to Stagecoach Grimsby-Cleethorpes and initially made part of the East Midland division, before the 2005 acquisition of Lincolnshire Roadcar led to Grimsby-Cleethorpes being amalgamated into the Stagecoach in Lincolnshire subdivision as part of a widened Stagecoach East Midlands subsidiary.

Following the acquisition of Lincolnshire RoadCar, buses and staff based at the former RoadCar's Grimsby depot in Garden Street were transferred to the Stagecoach Grimsby-Cleethorpes depot in Victoria Street, although they remained part of Stagecoach in Lincolnshire. The Garden Street premises was briefly used for the storage of old buses before being put up for sale in 2008, where in that same year, Stagecoach closed its Louth depot and transferred operations of Louth-area routes over to Grimsby-Cleethorpes.

On 6 October 2002, arsonists started a fire at the Victoria Street bus depot, damaging or destroying 17 buses.

In 2006, Stagecoach Grimsby-Cleethorpes received £522,677 of funding from the Department for Transport's 'Kickstart' initiative to improve local bus services, with further financial support also acquired from North East Lincolnshire Council. Circular routes 3F and 4, operating from Cleethorpes Pier to Bradley Cross Roads, were renumbered as 13 and 14 and saw a bus frequency increase alongside the introduction of new low-floor buses. Funding was also received to improve services on routes 16 and 45, which served Wybers Wood and Immingham respectively. These four routes gained the branding 'LoZone'.

A substantial overhaul of the bus network in Grimsby-Cleethorpes took place in September 2014, as part of the launch of the 'Simplibus' network. This involved the renumbering of most services into numerical order as well as the rerouting or withdrawal of some services, and coincided with a £4 million investment of 28 new single-deck buses for the fleet, all delivered new with Simplibus branding.

Another major overhaul of the Stagecoach Grimsby-Cleethorpes network took place in May 2023, following the award of £4.7 million to North East Lincolnshire Council from the Department for Transport as part of the council's Bus Service Improvement Plan (BSIP). Timetable and route changes took place on all local routes, which included the extension of route 6 to Cleethorpes Pier via Ladysmith Road, the extension of route 8 to Cleethorpes Pier via Kings Road, and the extension of routes 9 and 10 from North Sea Lane to Hewitts Circus. Route 7 was curtailed to operate between Hewitts Circus, Curzon Avenue and Grimsby Town Centre, with the enhancements to routes 9, 10 and 12 replacing sections which service 7 no longer served.

== Services ==
=== InterConnect network ===
Stagecoach Grimsby-Cleethorpes are one of the operators that run 'InterConnect' services, which are a network of rural and interurban bus services around the county. Grimsby operate 2 of these services, 51 to Louth and 53 to Lincoln, via Market Rasen.

The 51 service to Louth is run hourly during weekdays from Grimsby to Louth via Holton le Clay, while the 53 service to Lincoln is run every 2 hours during weekdays from Grimsby to Lincoln via Laceby, Market Rasen and Welton. Both services uses InterConnect liveried Wright Eclipse Urbans. The 53 service is also shared with Stagecoach in Lincolnshire's Lincoln depot, who operate several journeys throughout the day.

=== TwoFifty ===
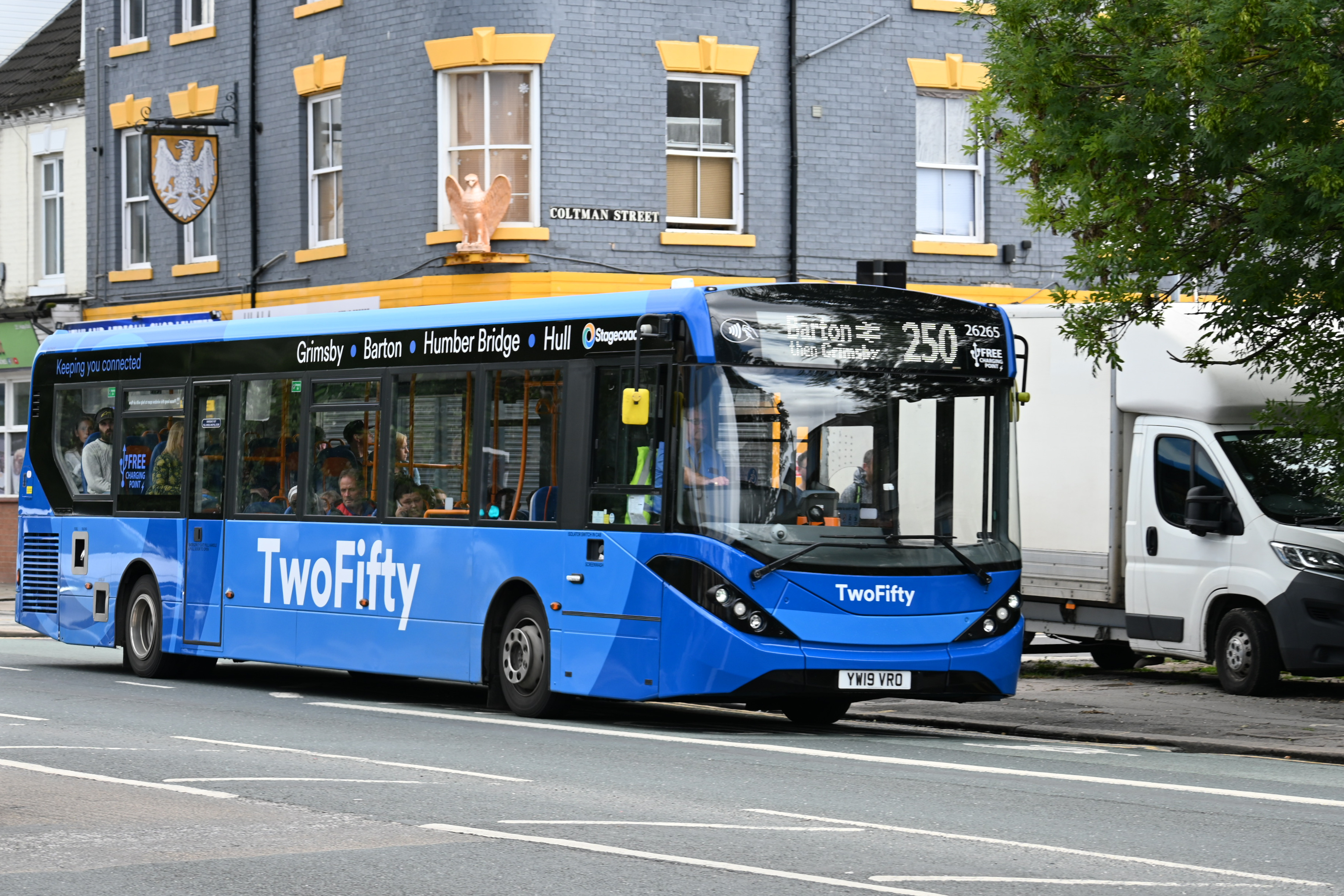
TwoFifty-branded Alexander Dennis Enviro200 MMC in Kingston upon Hull, July 2023

Stagecoach Grimsby operate the weekday hourly 250 service from Grimsby, via Laceby, Keelby, Barton upon Humber and the Humber Bridge to Hull. The 'TwoFifty' brand was launched in 2023, to replace the 'HumberFlyer' brand which had been used because the service previously served Humberside Airport.

Stagecoach launched service X1, branded as 'Humber Flyer', between Grimsby, Humberside Airport, and Hull in 2003 to partially replace service 909 that had connected Hull and Grimsby with Scunthorpe, Doncaster and Sheffield. Between 2005 and 2006, the service faced the threat of being axed due to cost issues connected to the toll payments for crossing the Humber Bridge. In Spring 2007, the service was diverted via Keelby and Laceby, and extended via Cleethorpes to New Waltham (replacing the service 12). The April 2009 the route number was changed from X1 to Humber Flyer, with a route change east of Grimsby Town Centre. The service operated via Weelsby Road and Cleethorpes Seafront, to terminate at Pleasure Island Theme Park. In April 2010, the service was diverted to serve Barton-upon-Humber, and was curtailed to terminate at Cleethorpes Pier.

Dedicated branded vehicles were introduced to the route in February 2015, with four Alexander Dennis Enviro300s gaining a blue-based 'Humber Flyer' livery.

In September 2020, the 250 was rerouted to no longer serve Humberside Airport, instead serving the villages of Barrow upon Humber, Thornton Curtis, Wootton and Ulceby.

In May 2023 the route was shortened to only service Grimsby and Hull via the Humber Bridge, removing the Cleethorpes section of the route. In June, the service was rebranded to 'TwoFifty', coinciding with the introduction of four blue-branded Alexander Dennis Enviro200 MMCs on the service to replace the existing Enviro300s.

=== Phone 'n' Ride ===
Stagecoach Grimsby-Cleethorpes are contracted by North East Lincolnshire Council to run the 'Phone 'n' Ride' demand-responsive transport service. First established by the council in 2005, this is currently operated with a fleet of Mercedes-Benz Sprinter minibuses, which operate around Grimsby, Cleethorpes and surrounding areas.
