= Scartho =

Village in Lincolnshire, England

Coordinates: 53.53992°N 0.09257°W

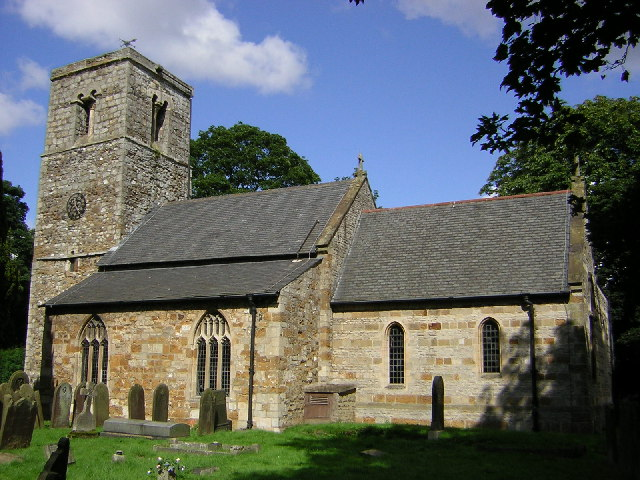
- Church of St Giles, Scartho

- Location within Lincolnshire
- Population: 10,408 (2011, ward)
- OS grid reference: TA265065
  - London: 145 mi (233 km) S
- Ceremonial county: Lincolnshire
- Region: Yorkshire and the Humber
- Country: England
- Sovereign state: United Kingdom
- Post town: GRIMSBY
- Postcode district: DN33
- Dialling code: 01472
- Police: Humberside
- Fire: Humberside
- Ambulance: East Midlands
- UK Parliament: Brigg and Immingham

Scartho (locally /ˈskæθə/) is a suburban village in the southern part of Grimsby, in the unitary authority area of North East Lincolnshire, in the ceremonial county of Lincolnshire, England. Scartho's population is approximately 11,000. Up until the end of the Second World War it was a village; subsequent post-war expansion on the greenfield areas between Scartho and Grimsby has resulted in the village becoming an outer suburb. Its population has increased through recent urban developments such as Scartho Top.

== History ==
=== Etymology ===
Like 'Grimsby' the etymology of the word Scartho can be traced back to having Old Norse origin, more than likely due to the ancestry of the surrounding area. In A Dictionary of British Place Names, A. D. Mills identifies the elements skarth or skafr and the ending haugr to give the meaning as 'Mound near a gap' or a mound 'frequented by cormorants'.

=== 11th century ===
The earliest surviving written reference to Scartho is in the Domesday Book of 1086 where it shares an entry with the adjoining parishes of Laceby and Bradley. The three parishes were under the lordship of Swein, Erik brother of Tosti, and Tosti brother of Erik, in 1066, and after the Norman invasion by Odo of Bayeux, a half-brother of William the Conqueror.

The church, dedicated to Saint Giles, retains a tower that dates to the Anglo Saxon period, although there have been more recent changes, including the removal of the north wall for an extension as recently as the 1950s. Walter Johnson in Byways in British Archaeology considers the tower to date from the period of church building in the 1042 to 1066 reign of Edward the Confessor and disagrees with 19th-century suggestions that the stonework shows signs of scorch marks from having been torched during earlier Viking raids. Rather, Johnson argues, the tower, and others from the same era in Lincolnshire, were built after the period of Viking raids but in a style that reflects a memory of Church towers being used as a place of refuge during those raids.

=== 19th century ===
In the first census of the United Kingdom in 1801 Scartho had 135 inhabitants, in 1831 the population was 147.

In 1894, a workhouse and infirmary were built at a 10-acre (40,000 m^{2}) site on the west-side of Scartho Road to the south of Grimsby. These new buildings were opened on 9 October 1894 by the Right Honourable John Shaw Lefevre. Following the Local Government Act 1929, the workhouse came under the control of Grimsby Town Council's public assistance committee and was renamed Scartho Road Institution. After the introduction of the National Health Act in 1948 it became a general hospital. For many years it was known as Grimsby District General Hospital. Following the erection of the new Princess of Wales' hospital to the south of the site, a number of the former workhouse buildings have been demolished or stand empty. Others are still used for administrative or ancillary services.

=== 20th century ===
Scartho Road is home to the Flower Cottages. Built in 1903, they are named after the order that flowers come into bloom after winter, starting at number 100 with Snowdrop Cottage, 98 Crocus Cottage, and finishing at number 76. The architect was Herbert Scaping.

In 1916, 13 bombs were dropped on Scartho by a German Zeppelin, but no-one was killed or injured. The site where one bomb fell is now home to a branch of Barclays Bank, an optician, a few shops and a dance school. At the side of the building is a plaque commemorating this event. A monument giving thanks that no-one was hurt can be found at a spot where another bomb fell, in the churchyard of the nearby parish church of St. Giles, itself believed to be nearly a thousand years old. The church itself was badly damaged in the attack.

Scartho was a separate civil parish until 1928. Its northern boundary included part of the area that now forms the Nunsthorpe housing estate. In that year the greater part of the village was absorbed by Grimsby, with a small part being attached to the parish of Waltham.

Before the Second World War building work commenced on what had been Green Belt land. These constructions include properties along Scartho Road and the roads off it, including Cragston Avenue, Limetree Avenue and Sycamore Avenue.

The village saw post-war growth following the then government-policy of local councils building houses to replace those damaged in the war. This led to the development of three estates on green-belt land around the village: Springfield, Fairfield and (on a smaller-scale) the area around Edge Avenue. As part of this growth three schools were created – Springfield First and Middle schools, Fairfield First and Middle schools and Scartho First and Middle schools (in Edge Avenue).

In 1958 the village opened its first public house, the Rose and Crown on Louth Road. The Seven Seas opened in 1962 in Springfield.

In 1960 the local council built a swimming pool at the northernmost tip of the village boundary, next to the Barratts Playing Field. This is known locally as 'Scatha Baths'. It was closed in December 2015 and has now been demolished.

In 1965 a new shopping arcade on Waltham Road was constructed in the area, followed a few years later by a similar development on the junction of Louth Road and Pinfold Lane which housed two banks and several retail premises.

Between 1974 and 1982 the village saw the construction of the town's new hospital, the Grimsby District General Hospital, next to an existing smaller site. It was opened in 1982 by Her Royal Highness, the Princess of Wales. After her death in 1997 it was renamed the Diana, Princess of Wales Hospital. The nearby Scartho Top development began in the mid-1990s.

== Governance ==
North East Lincolnshire Council has one council ward within the area of Scartho.

Scartho Ward

- Cllr Dan Humphrey (Labour)
- Cllr Ian Lindley (Conservative)
- Cllr Tony Charlesworth (Reform)

In 1921 the civil parish had a population of 744. On 1 April 1928 the parish was abolished to form Grimsby, part also went to Waltham.

From 1974 to 1996 it was in the county of Humberside. Until 1996 it was in Great Grimsby district.

== Community ==
Scartho's retail availability includes a Spar mini-supermarket on Waltham Road (closed in 2026 along with the Post Office), surrounded by a number of other businesses including take-aways and a pharmacy. The supermarket houses the village Post Office after the long-established facility in Pinfold Lane closed in 2000. At this time one of the villages' two banks (Lloyds TSB – previously a Lloyds Bank) closed after 33 years of service. On Louth Road is a number of other businesses including a veterinary clinic, a newsagent, a building society and a pet store.

== Notable people ==
- Richard A Collins (1966) – scientist and author, lived with his parents in Holton-le-Clay and Scartho for most of his youth.
- Brenda Fisher (b.1927) - long-distance and world record swimmer
- Hanserd Knollys (1599–1691) - an English particular Baptist minister was appointed rector of the church in the 1640s.
