= Herbert Scaping =

Irish architect (1866–1934)

Herbert C. Scaping
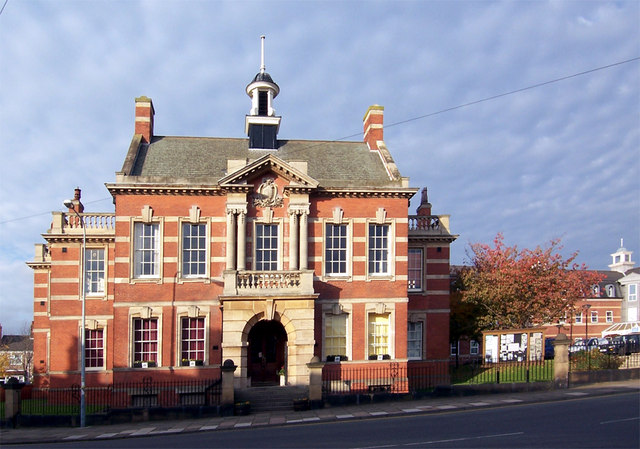
- The Old Council House, Cambridge Street, Cleethorpes
- Born: 15 August 1866; Rathfarnham, co.Dublin.
- Died: 5 February 1934 (aged 67); Park Avenue, Grimsby
- Education: Pupil of Smith and Broderick of Hull
- Occupation: Architect
- Buildings: Cleethorpe Old Council House and Grimsby Court House
- Projects: Nunesthorpe Housing Estate

Herbert C. Scaping (1866–1934) was an architect who worked in Grimsby, Lincolnshire in the Arts and Crafts and Art Nouveau styles. He was born in Rathfarnham, co Dublin before his family moved to Hull, his only known family are his two daughters Rathlea and Rathgowry. He trained with Smith and Broderick of Hull, setting up his own practice in Grimsby in 1890. He became the Lincoln Diocesan surveyor and surveyor to Lord Heneage. Architect to the Grimsby Education Committee and Board of Guardians. His office was at Court Chambers in Grimsby.

== Architectural Work ==
=== Public Buildings ===
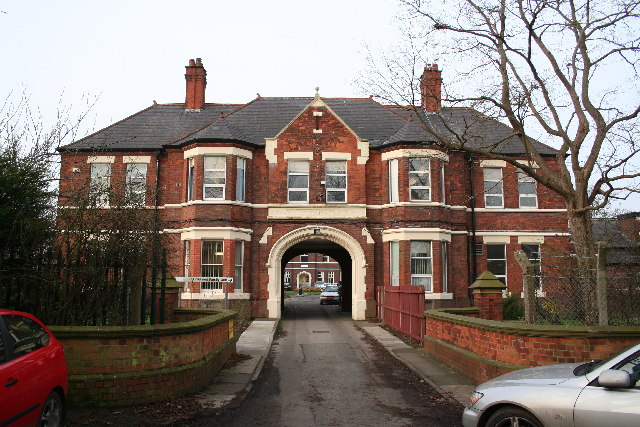
Grimsby Workhouse/Old Hospital 1892 by Ernest Farebrother and Herbert Scaping

- Scartho, Grimsby Workhouse which became Grimsby Old Hospital. 1892. Ernest William Farebrother was the original architect, but after his death the work was continued by Herbert Scaping.
- Kilton Hill Infirmary, Worksop, Nottinghamshire. 1901-1904. Workhouse Infirmary. Later part of Bassetlaw Hospital Trust. Central administrative block with Baroque revival entrance facade and two plain side wings.

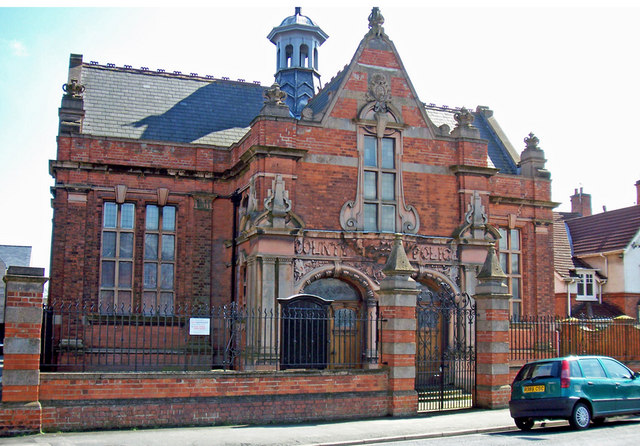
Old Court House and former County Police Building, Brighowgate, Grimsby

- Grimsby Old Court House, Brighowgate. 1902. Edwardian with Art Nouveau detail

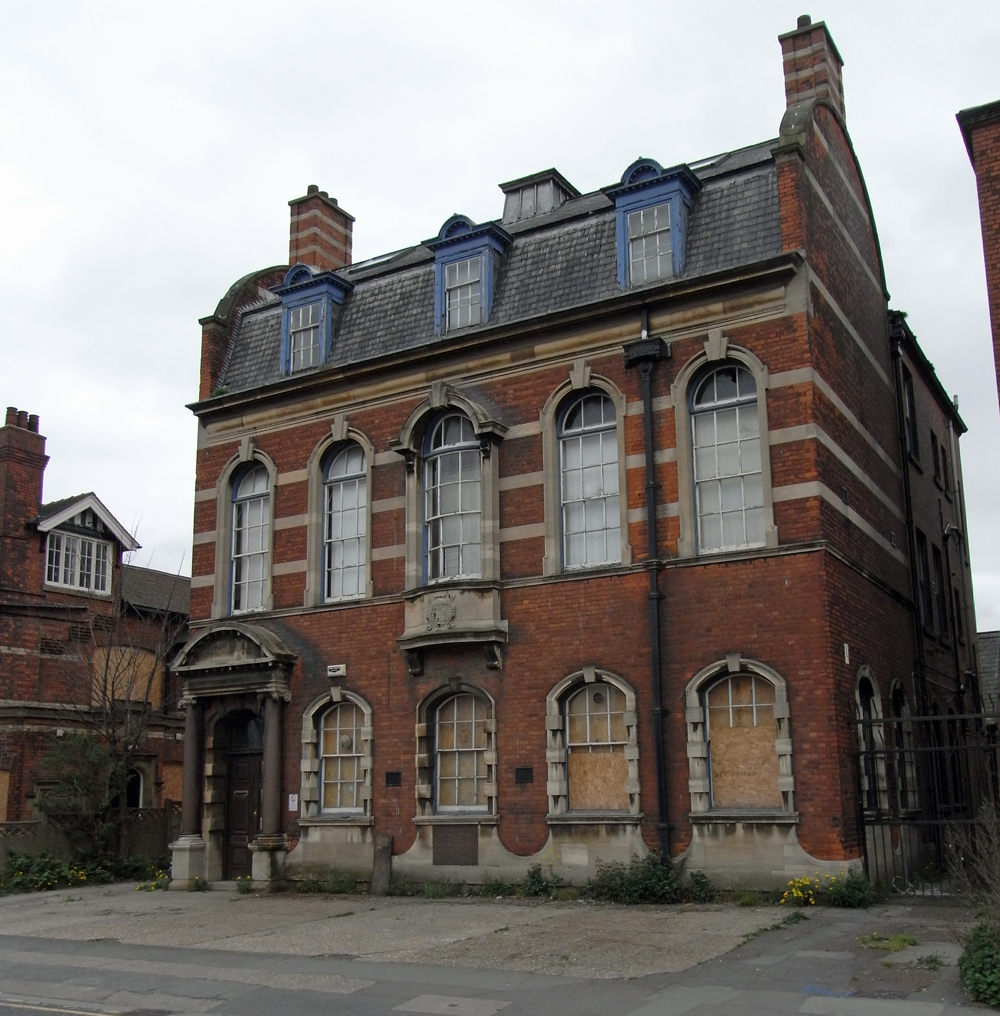
Former Education Department Offices, Eleanor Street, Grimsby

- Cleethorpes Town Hall. 1904. Brick with stone dressings. with a crisply detailed Baroque facade surmounted by a lantern tower. Top-lit staircase hall, the balustrade in a bold Arts and Crafts foliate design in cast iron
- Grimsby Former Education Offices, Eleanor Street. 1900. Brick with stone dressings in a Norman Shaw Baroque manner. The upper floor enriched with bands of stone. Mansard food with rounded gable ends.
- Grimsby, Salvation Army Hostel, Brighowgate. 1913. Neo-Georgian.

=== Shops and Commercial Buildings ===
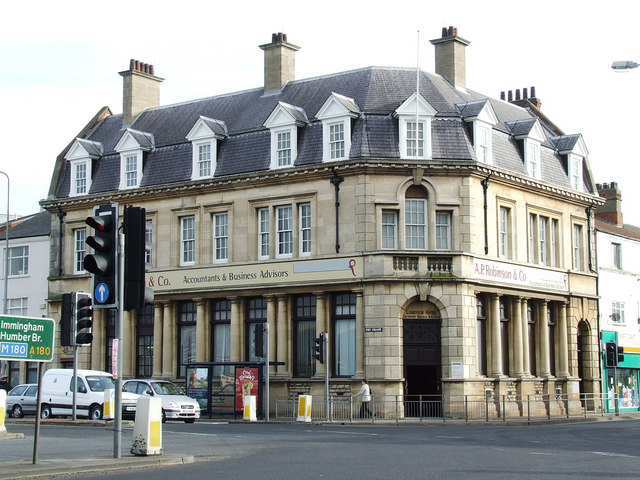
National Provincial Bank. 1900.

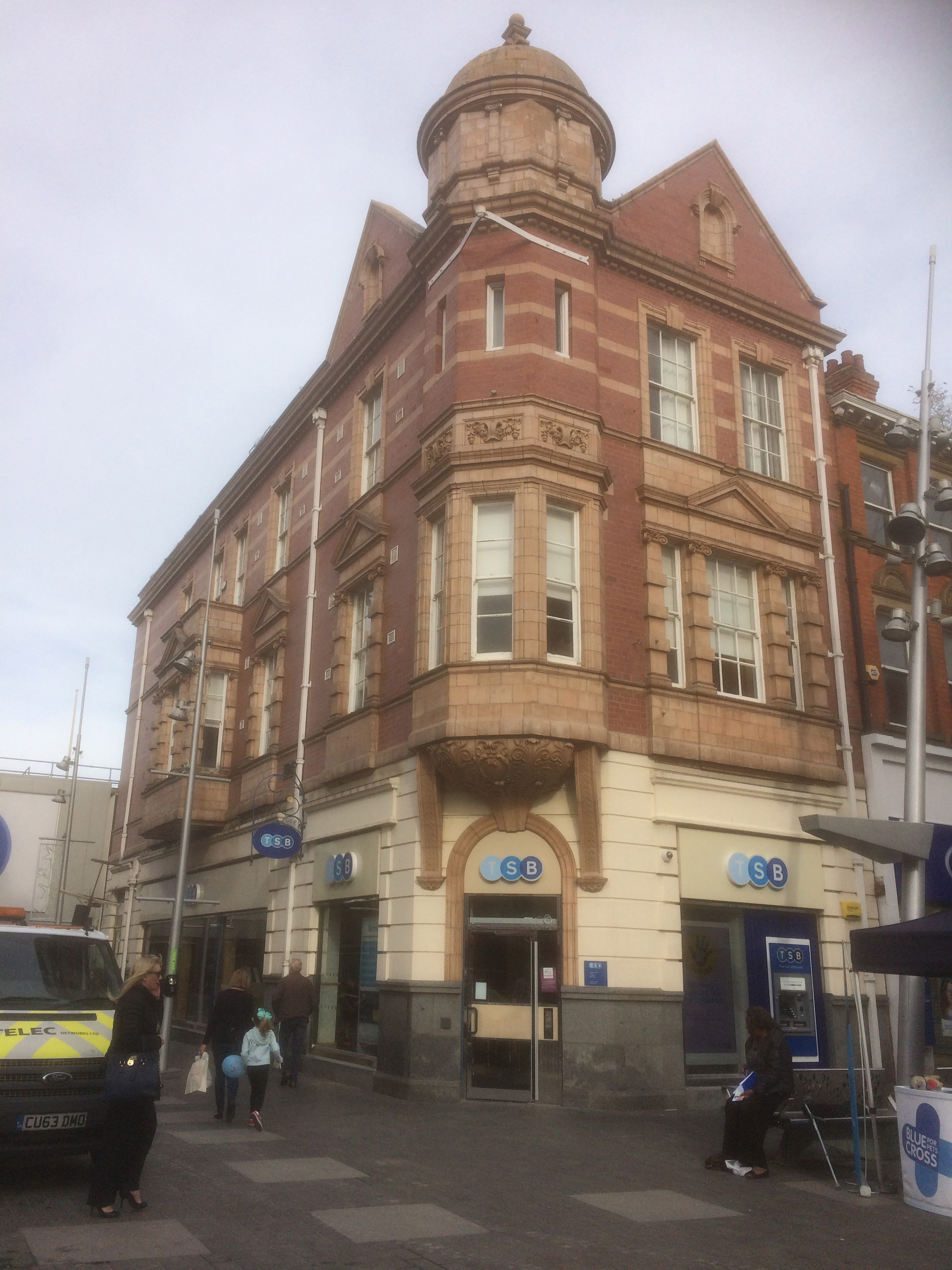
TSB Victoria Street, Grimsby

- Grimsby. National Provincial Bank. Riby Road 1900. Stone faced Neo-Georgian with mansard roof and pedimented dormer window

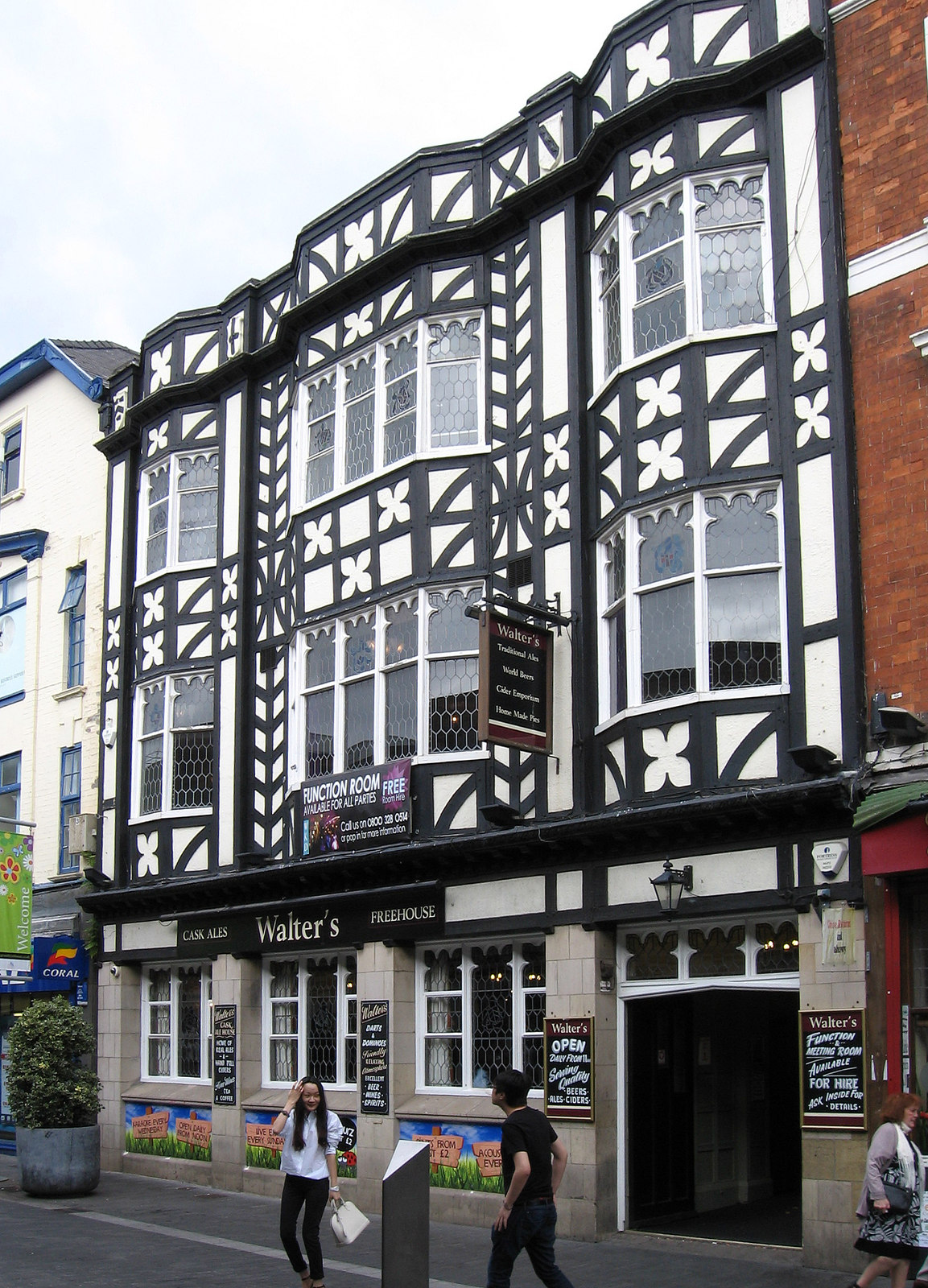
Grimsby Former Pestle and Mortar, 1917 now Walters

- Grimsby, Royal Insurance Building (now TSB), No. 43 Victoria Street West.1904 Red brick with buff terracotta dressings and marble plinth in Edwardian freestyle. On corner of Victoria Street with Brewery Street.Three storeys with four bays on Brewery Street frontage. At the corner a round-arched entrance with keystone and side brackets supporting a carved corbelled base to an octagonal angle turret which rises through the second and third storeys. Brewery Street front has a rectangular first-floor oriel to centre left with a pilastered three part window, forming the parapet to a second-floor balcony. Flanking this are windows in similar Ionic pilastered and pedimented surrounds. All second-floor windows linked by sill string course and 3 flush bands which is very typical of Scaping’s work. Dentilled cornice. The corner turret has an octagonal upper stage with a string course carrying small Ionic pilasters, moulded cornice and dome with ball finial. Flanking bays have coped gables with central round-headed niches' Listed Grade II in June 1999.

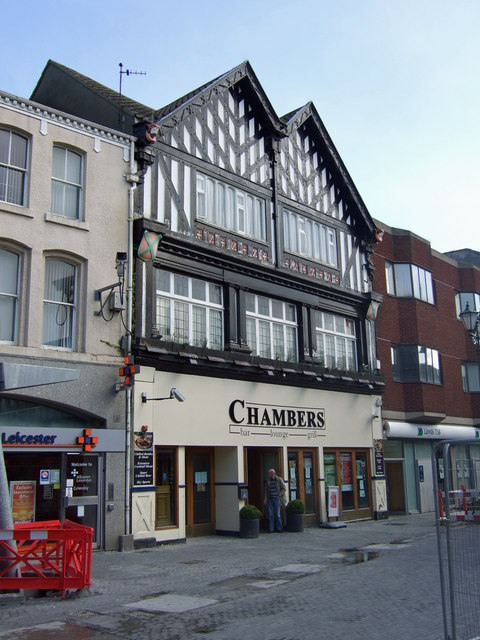
Tudor Cafe/Chambers Bar, Lounge and Grill. Former Litten Tree

- Grimsby Former Pestle and Mortar Public House, 5-6 Old Market Place (1917) for Hadley's Brewery. Brick with composite stone facing to ground floor, imitation timber-framing and plaster infill to upper floors. Slate roof. Tudor Revival style, with ornate West Midlands-style timber framing.
- Tudor Cafe/Chambers Bar, Lounge and Grill. Former Litten Tree, Grimsby. Half timbered twin gabled frontage.

=== Grimsby School of Art ===
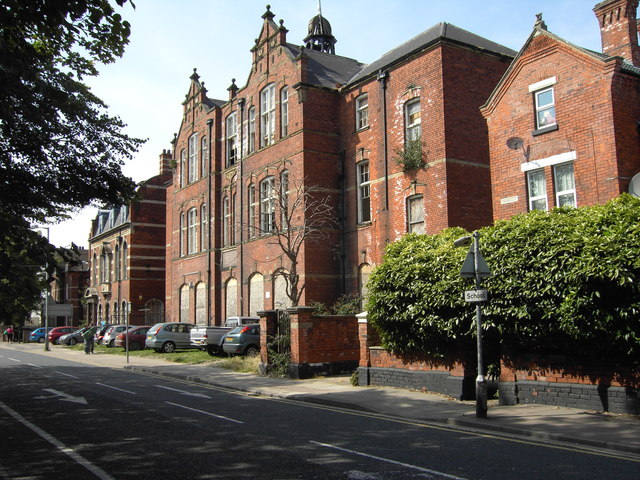
The Old Art College, Eleanor Street 1895

- Grimsby, Eleanor Street. Wintringham Grammar School (1894) which became Grimsby Municipal College and later Technical school, art college and local education authority building, is now derelict. Herbert C Scaping designed the Grade II listed building, which displays his trademark cupola on the roof, and it was built by Grimsby builders Hewins and Goodhand. Now derelict.

=== Houses ===
- Rathfarnham, Welholme Road. Grimsby. ?1902. House built by Scaping for himself.
- Bargate, Grimsby. House for Sir Alec Black
- Nos. 25 & @7, Rathlea (25) and Rathgowry (27), Weelsby Road, Grimsby with major changes made to 27 but fewer to 25. Semi-detached house.
- Barnoldby le BeckHouse for Mr Osmond.

=== Housing Developments ===
- Weelsby Road, Grimsby.
- Scartho. Waltham Road, Nos 74-100. Semi detached row of cottages named Flower cottages.
- Grimsby Nunsthorpe Estate and School. A post First World War housing estate with many of the houses designed by Scaping

== Literature ==
- Antram N (revised), Pevsner N & Harris J, (1989), The Buildings of England: Lincolnshire, Yale University Press.
- Antonia Brodie (ed), Directory of British Architects, 1834–1914: 2 Vols, British Architectural Library, Royal Institute of British Architects, 2001
- Chapman P. Herbert Scaping 1866-1934. The man who made Grimsby. Lincolnshire Life vol 7, no 2 April 1968 pp 26–31
