= Cleethorpes Town Hall =

Municipal building in Cleethorpes, Lincolnshire, England

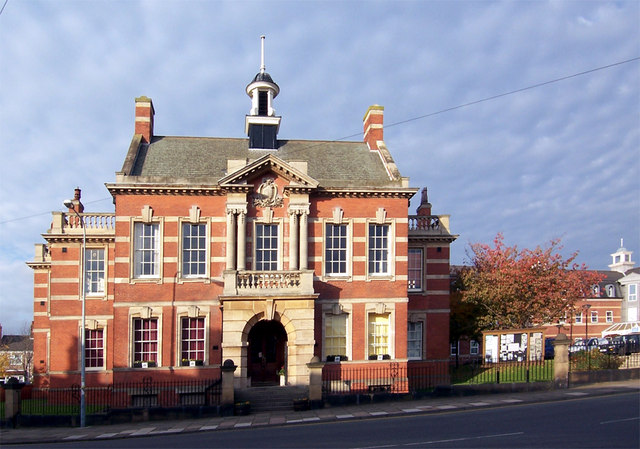
- Cleethorpes Town Hall

- Shown in Lincolnshire
- 53.5577°N 0.0275°W
- Location: Knoll Street, Cleethorpes

History
- Built: 1905

Site notes
- Architect: Herbert Scaping
- Architectural style: Baroque style

Listed Building – Grade II
- Official name: Council House
- Designated: 17 September 1980
- Reference no.: 1103474

Cleethorpes Town Hall is a municipal structure in Knoll Street, Cleethorpes, Lincolnshire, England. The town hall, which was the headquarters of Cleethorpes Borough Council, is a Grade II listed building.

== History ==
After significant population growth, mainly associated with the seaside tourism industry, Cleethorpes became an urban district in 1894. In this context civic leaders decided to procure a council house: the site selected was open land owned by Councillor Henry Kelly.

The new building was designed by Herbert Scaping in the Baroque style, built in red brick with stone dressings by Henry Marrows and was opened in 1905. The design involved a symmetrical main frontage with five bays facing onto Knoll Street; the middle bay featured a porch with a rusticated stone surround supporting a balustrade; on the first floor there was a sash window which was flanked by two pairs of Ionic order columns which supported a modillioned pediment with a cartouche in the centre of the tympanum. Internally, the principal room was the council chamber.

The area was advanced to the status of municipal borough with the council house as its headquarters in 1936. The council house continued to serve as the headquarters of Cleethorpes Borough Council for much of the 20th century and continued to be the local seat of government after Cleethorpes District Council was formed in 1974. Princess Alice, Duchess of Gloucester visited the building, as part of the celebrations to commemorate the 300th anniversary of the founding of the Royal Lincolnshire Regiment, on 8 September 1985.

In order to accommodate the increasing accommodation requirements of council officers and their departments, new civic offices, designed by William Saunders & Partners in the postmodern style were built to the northeast of the council house and opened in 1987. During the 1980s the building became known as the "Cleethorpes Town Hall": however, it ceased to be the local seat of government when North East Lincolnshire Council became the unitary authority, with its offices in Grimsby, in 1996. The Prime Minister, David Cameron, accompanied by the Duke of Kent, visited the town hall on armed forces day in June 2016.

In the town hall there is an iconic statue entitled The Boy with the Leaking Boot, which had been given to the town by the Swedish vice-consul, John Carlbom, and installed in Kingsway Gardens, in 1918. After the statue was repeatedly vandalised, it was relocated to the landing half way up the staircase in the town hall and, instead, a replica was installed in Kingsway Gardens.
