= Doncaster Shopping Centre =

Doncaster Shopping Centre may refer to:

- Frenchgate Shopping Centre in Doncaster, England
- Westfield Doncaster in Melbourne, Australia
