= Frenchgate =

Frenchgate may refer to:

- 'Frenchgate' - the name given to a leak of a controversial and disputed memo during the 2015 UK General Election for which Scottish Secretary Alistair Carmichael took responsibility after the election
- Frenchgate Centre, Doncaster, United Kingdom
- Frenchgate Interchange, Doncaster, United Kingdom
