= Black Lady of Bradley Woods =

Ghost that haunts a Lincolnshire wood

Coordinates: 53.53°N 0.13°W

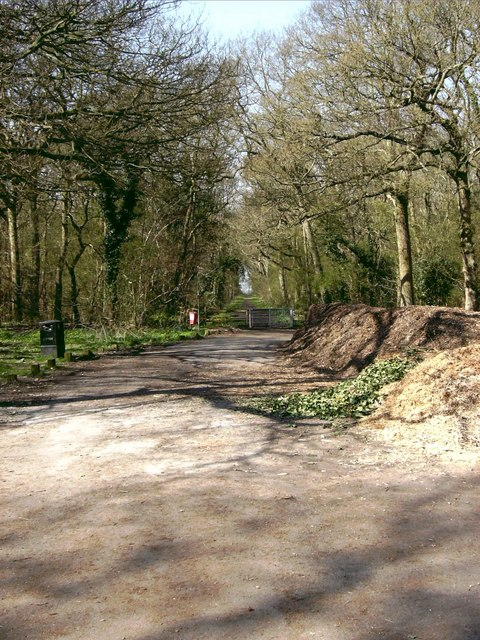
Bradley Woods

The Black Lady of Bradley Woods is a ghost which reportedly haunts the woods near the village of Bradley, Lincolnshire, England.

Alleged eyewitnesses have described her as being young and pretty, around 5 ft 6 in (168 cm) tall, dressed in a flowing black cloak and a black hood that obscures her hair but reveals her mournful, pale, tear-soaked face. According to the legend she has never harmed anyone and has only ever proved to be a pitiful, if unnerving sight.

== Origins ==
The story is known to have been told for many generations. It was once used by parents to frighten children; this appears to have been a common practice among parents in the area, and children were warned that if they were not safely in bed by a certain time, "the black lady will get you!".

One theory that has been put forward is that the Black Lady is the ghost of a nun. She appears dressed in black, and certainly at nearby Nunsthorpe (now a suburb of Grimsby), there was a convent until the Reformation. This theory gives no reason as to why the Black Lady should have moved from Nunsthorpe to Bradley Woods, 2 miles (3 km) away. Also, though she may be dressed in black, few if any eyewitnesses have described her appearance as matching that of a nun.

Another possible explanation is that she was a spinster who at one time lived a life of isolation in her cottage in the woods far enough away from the village. If village children had come across a woman living on her own in the woods, who became angry when her privacy and solitude was breached, then imaginary tales of witchcraft could have exaggerated the legend.

Neither of these theories tie in with the folklore.

== The myth ==
During the Wars of the Roses, or alternatively the Barons' Wars, a young woodsman and his wife lived with their baby son in a cottage in Bradley Woods. Eventually the woodsman went off to fight in the wars, leaving his wife to bring up the baby alone. After many months there was no news of the woodsman. Every day she held her child and walked to the edge of the woods, waiting for the sight of her husband coming home, until one day the enemy army crossed the Humber and marched through the area on the way to attack Lincoln. As she was leaving her cottage, the woman was set upon by three horsemen who brutally raped her before snatching the baby boy and riding off laughing into the woods. Heartbroken and humiliated, she wandered the woods searching in vain for her child and husband. After her death people began to see her wandering the woods, carrying on her never-ending search.
