= Bradley and Dixon Woods =

Park in North East Lincolnshire, England

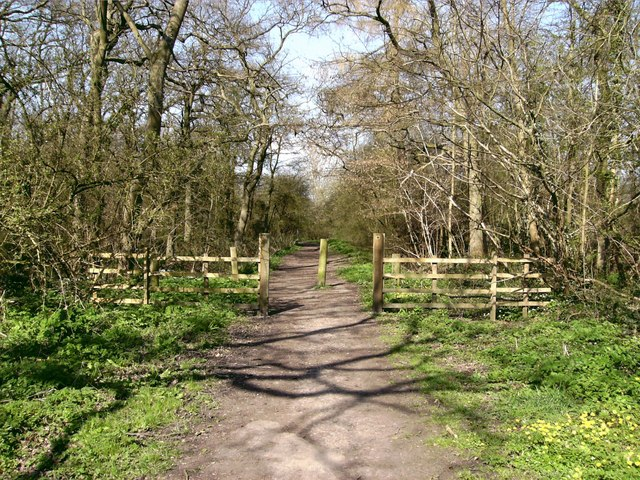
- Entrance to Bradley Woods
- Interactive map of Bradley and Dixon Woods
- Type: Local Nature Reserve
- Location: South of Grimsby, North East Lincolnshire
- OS grid: TA 242 059
- Coordinates: 53.53°N 0.13°W
- Area: 41.77 hectares (103.2 acres)
- Manager: North East Lincolnshire Council

Bradley and Dixon Woods is a 41.77-hectare (103.2-acre) local nature reserve near the town of Grimsby in North East Lincolnshire. It is owned and managed by North East Lincolnshire Council. It is composed of ancient woodland, meadows, ponds and bird feeding sites, and is located south-west of Grimsby and south of the village of Bradley; the site is bounded to the north by Woodlands Farm and Bradley Woodlands Independent Hospital. The LNR can be accessed by the public via the B1444 off the A46 road. The woods are the subject of local folklore.
