= Stagecoach in Lincolnshire =

Bus operator in Lincolnshire, England

Stagecoach Lincolnshire

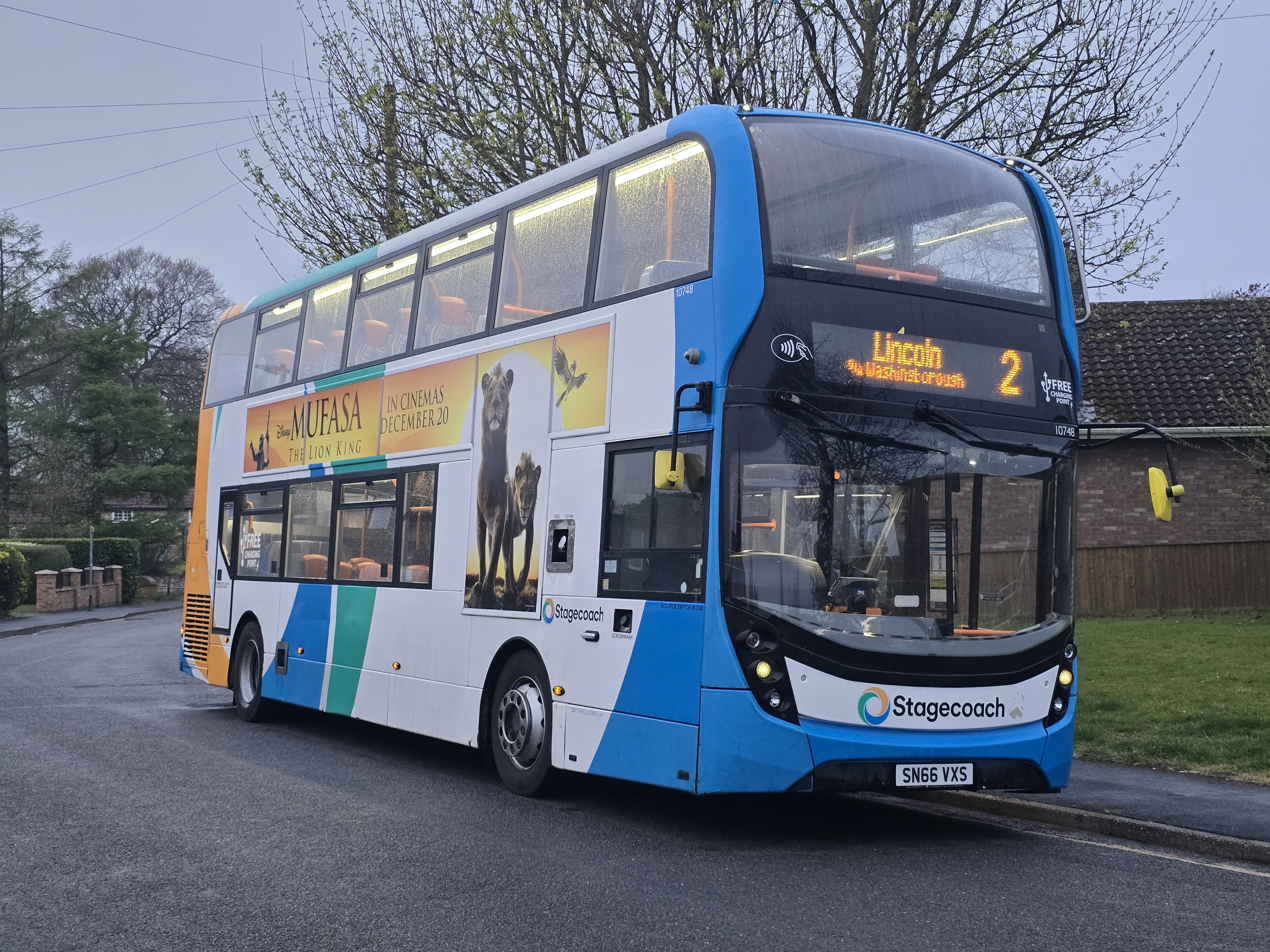
- Alexander Dennis Enviro400 MMC in Branston in April 2025
- Parent: Stagecoach Group
- Founded: 2005; 21 years ago
- Headquarters: Lincoln
- Service area: Gainsborough; Grimsby; Lincoln; Louth; Newark-on-Trent; Scunthorpe; Skegness
- Service type: Bus
- Depots: 6
- Website: www.stagecoachbus.com

Stagecoach in Lincolnshire is a bus company, formerly known as Lincolnshire RoadCar, operating services throughout Lincolnshire. The company is a division of Stagecoach East Midlands, which is a subsidiary of the Stagecoach Group.

== History ==
=== Lincolnshire Road Car Company ===
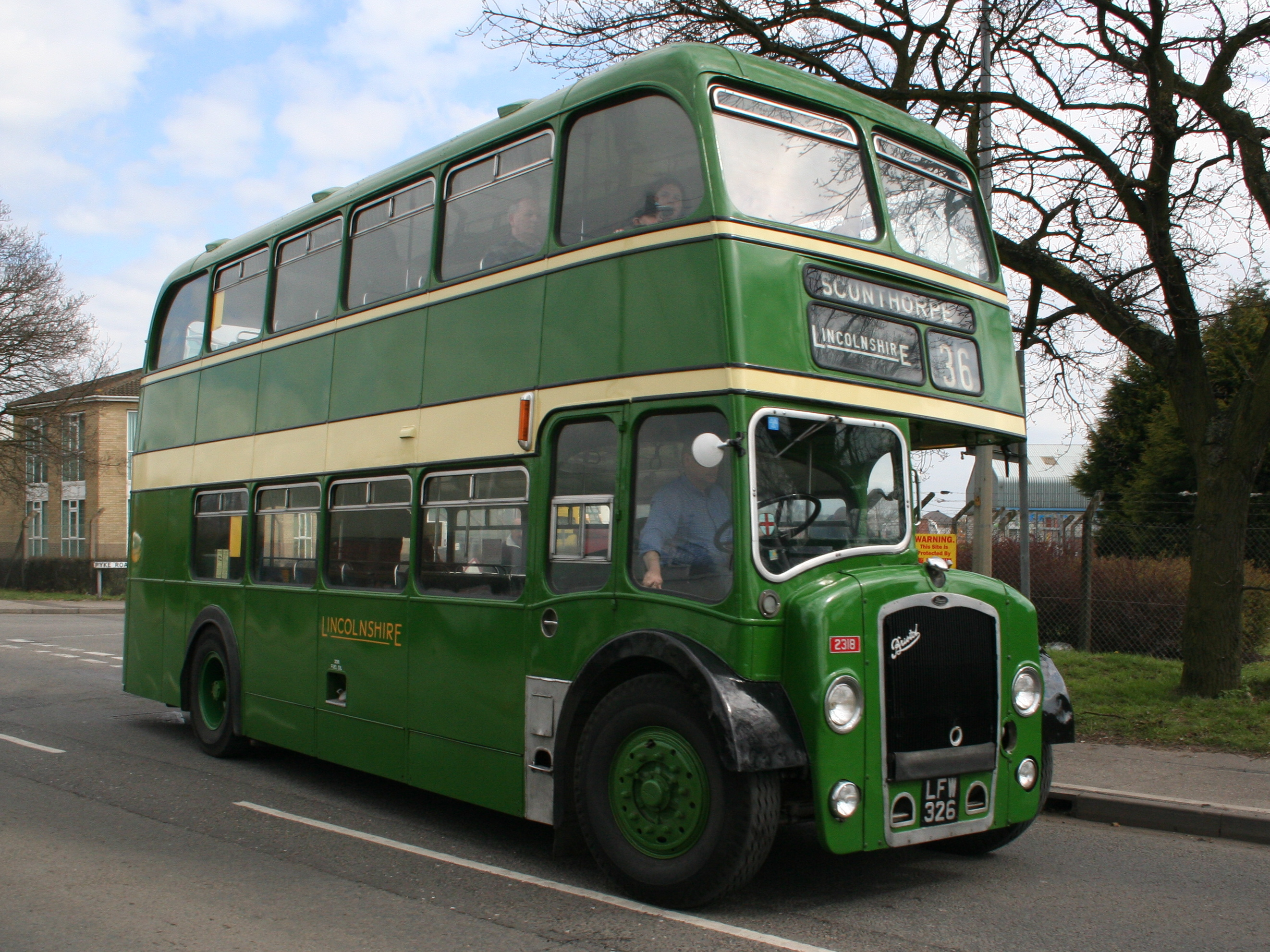
Preserved Lincolnshire Road Car Company ECW bodied Bristol Lodekka in Lincoln in April 2006

The Lincolnshire Road Car Company was formed in 1928 after being renamed from the Lincoln-based Silver Queen Motor Omnibus Company, which was first formed in 1922 and initially ran services to Grantham and Louth. Lincolnshire Road Car had acquired a number of independent operators before joining the Tilling Group in 1929, then going on to acquire the Lincolnshire operations of United Automobile Services in 1931. Under the Transport Act 1968, Lincolnshire Road Car, by then a part of the state-owned Transport Holding Company, became part of the National Bus Company.

The company ran services from throughout the county of Lincolnshire including some services over the county boundaries to such towns as Newark-on-Trent and Retford in Nottinghamshire as well as Kingston upon Hull and Goole in the East Riding of Yorkshire. Many rural services ran from Lincoln's St. Marks Bus Station to the outlying villages surrounding the city. Although these services ran within the city boundary, passengers were not allowed to use them for internal journeys within the city. Bus services within the city of Lincoln were provided by Lincoln City (Corporation) Transport. Lincolnshire Road Car not only provided long-distance services within the county but also town services within many towns in the county, such as Louth and Sleaford.

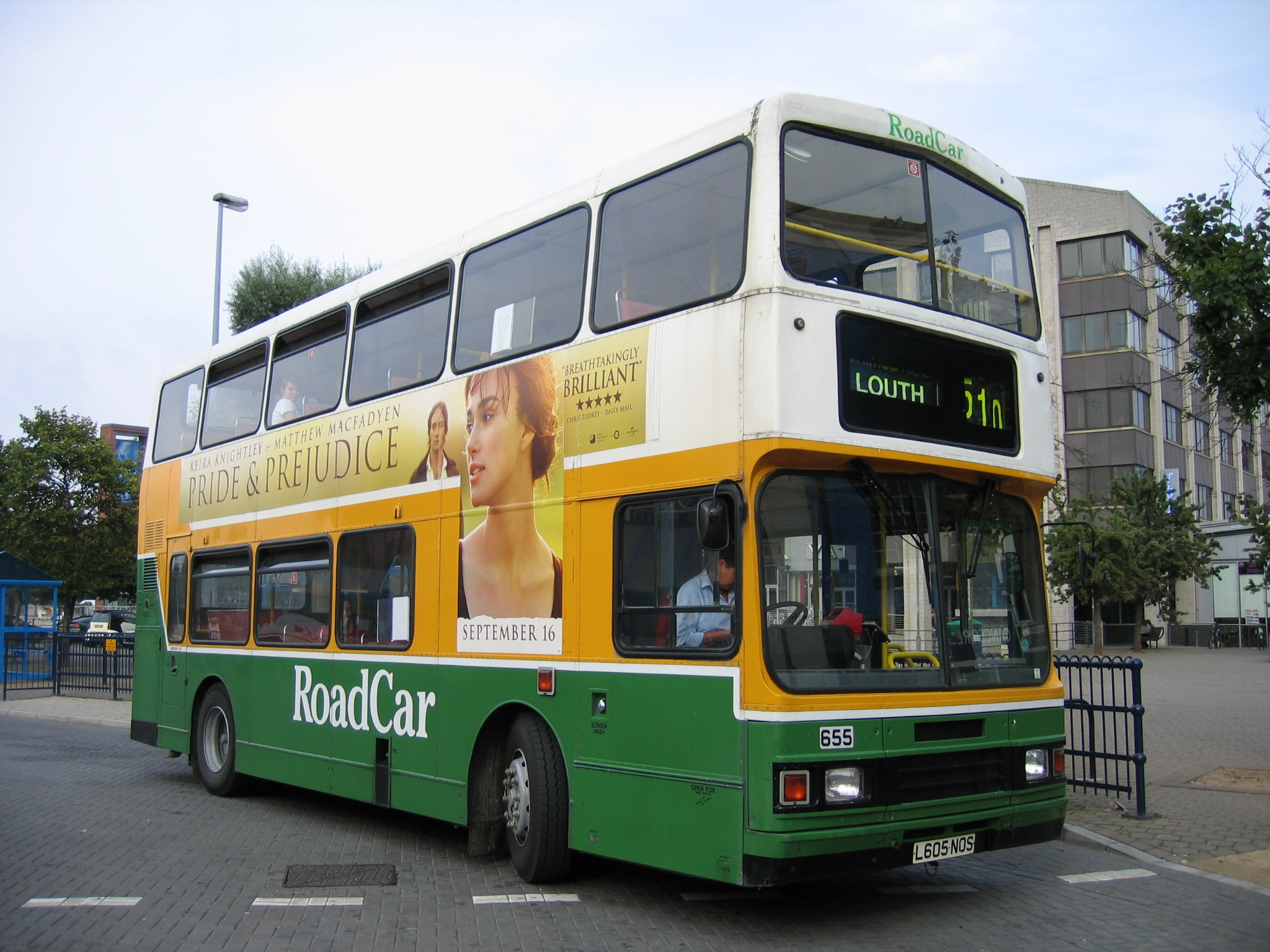
RoadCar Alexander bodied Leyland Olympian in Grimsby in September 2005

When the Transport Act 1985 deregulated bus services, the National Bus Company was broken up and Lincolnshire Road Car was acquired by the Yorkshire Traction Group in 1988. Prior to this, the company began painting their fleet green and yellow and used fleetnames simply reading 'RoadCar'. A hire coach operation named 'Coachlink' was also founded under Traction Group ownership, however it would be dissolved by March 2004 due to the business becoming financially unviable.

Upon deregulation, passengers were also permitted to use RoadCar services for journeys wholly within the city of Lincoln and RoadCar and city buses started competing on many routes in Lincoln and around the surrounding villages, the city buses leaving the confines of the city for rural routes for the first time. Lincolnshire RoadCar took over Lincoln City Transport in 1993 after the company incurred losses from competing with RoadCar and had a management buyout offer rejected.

In 1988, RoadCar acquired the business of Newark-on-Trent independent company W. Gash & Sons. Initially, the company was operated as a separate entity from RoadCar, but in 1989, both companies merged after inspections found the Gash fleet to be mechanically deficient, which saw the traffic commissioner strip Gash of its operating license.

RoadCar introduced its first low floor buses on Skegness town services in late 1997. These were single-deck buses branded as "Super Buzz", adopting a yellow, red and blue striped livery that featured a stylised bee graphic. Roadcar later expanded its low-floor fleet from February 1999 through being a founder operator of the Lincolnshire County Council administered Lincolnshire InterConnect rural bus network; RoadCar introduced three "Lo-Liner" branded single-deck buses on service 6 between Lincoln and Skegness, which originally ran alongside high-floor "Hi-Liner" double-decker buses.

In 2001, RoadCar introduced their first low floor double deckers. These buses originally ran alongside the existing Hi and Lo-Liners on their Connect 6 route before they were fully replaced by these new buses a year later. These low floor double deckers were later be introduced on their "Super Buzz" branded routes in 2004, which by then the brand was already introduced across the Lincoln, Newark, Grimsby and Scunthorpe Town Service routes.

=== Stagecoach ownership ===
RoadCar became a subsidiary of the Stagecoach Group in December 2005 following the group's purchase of the Traction Group. In September 2006, RoadCar was rebranded as Stagecoach in Lincolnshire, becoming part of an enlarged Stagecoach East Midlands subdivision that moved its headquarters from Chesterfield to Lincoln.

From March 2006, Stagecoach purchased new buses for the company, among them four Alexander Dennis Darts and five MAN 18.220/Alexander Dennis ALX300s for the Gainsborough area, in a bid to improve services, gradually phasing out the oldest of RoadCar's buses. The new vehicles temporarily featured RoadCar logos in the front and side windows, and buses from other Stagecoach areas were seen in the area during the transition. The existing fleet then had their RoadCar logos removed.

At the beginning of August 2006, Stagecoach caused considerable controversy with their decision to make major changes to the bus network in Lincoln. Some services were withdrawn without replacement while others benefited from frequency increases. Following a local media campaign, the company agreed to make some changes to return services to those areas which had lost them. At the same time, the company also lost a majority of its service work in Nottinghamshire to Veolia Transport's subsidiary Dunn-Line and local company KJB.

In Autumn 2007 Stagecoach announced the withdrawal of some services in Louth, Lincoln and Gainsborough. The threatened services survived after successful negotiations with the district councils over subsidies. In August 2008, however, the company's depot in Louth was closed, with some routes being taken over by Skegness and Grimsby depots and a number of contracted routes surrendered. A new depot in Skegness was later opened by Stagecoach in September 2009, costing £2.2 million to construct.

Stagecoach first introduced the 'Simplibus' network concept to Lincoln in February 2017, the third such network to be launched in Stagecoach East Midlands. A £3 million investment into the city's bus services saw ten new single-deck buses enter service on a numerically renumbered route network. This development coincided with the opening of Lincoln's new bus station in January. A year later in Scunthorpe, Stagecoach entered a partnership with local independent bus company Hornsbys and North Lincolnshire Council as part of a Quality Bus Partnership, creating 'Simplibus North Lincolnshire'. This Simplibus network was launched with a joint remuneration of Stagecoach and Hornsbys bus services around Scunthorpe and Brigg and surrounding areas into numerical order, a circular route created in Scunthorpe, and buses being branded with Simplibus logos across both fleets.

== Depots ==
- Gainsborough (Lusher Way, Corringham Road Industrial Estate)
- Lincoln (Great Northern Terrace)
- Newark (Now regarded as outstation of Lincoln)
- Scunthorpe (High Street East)
- Skegness (Skegness Road, Burgh Le Marsh - previously at Grosvenor Road)
- Spalding (Wardentree Lane)

== Services ==
=== InterConnect ===
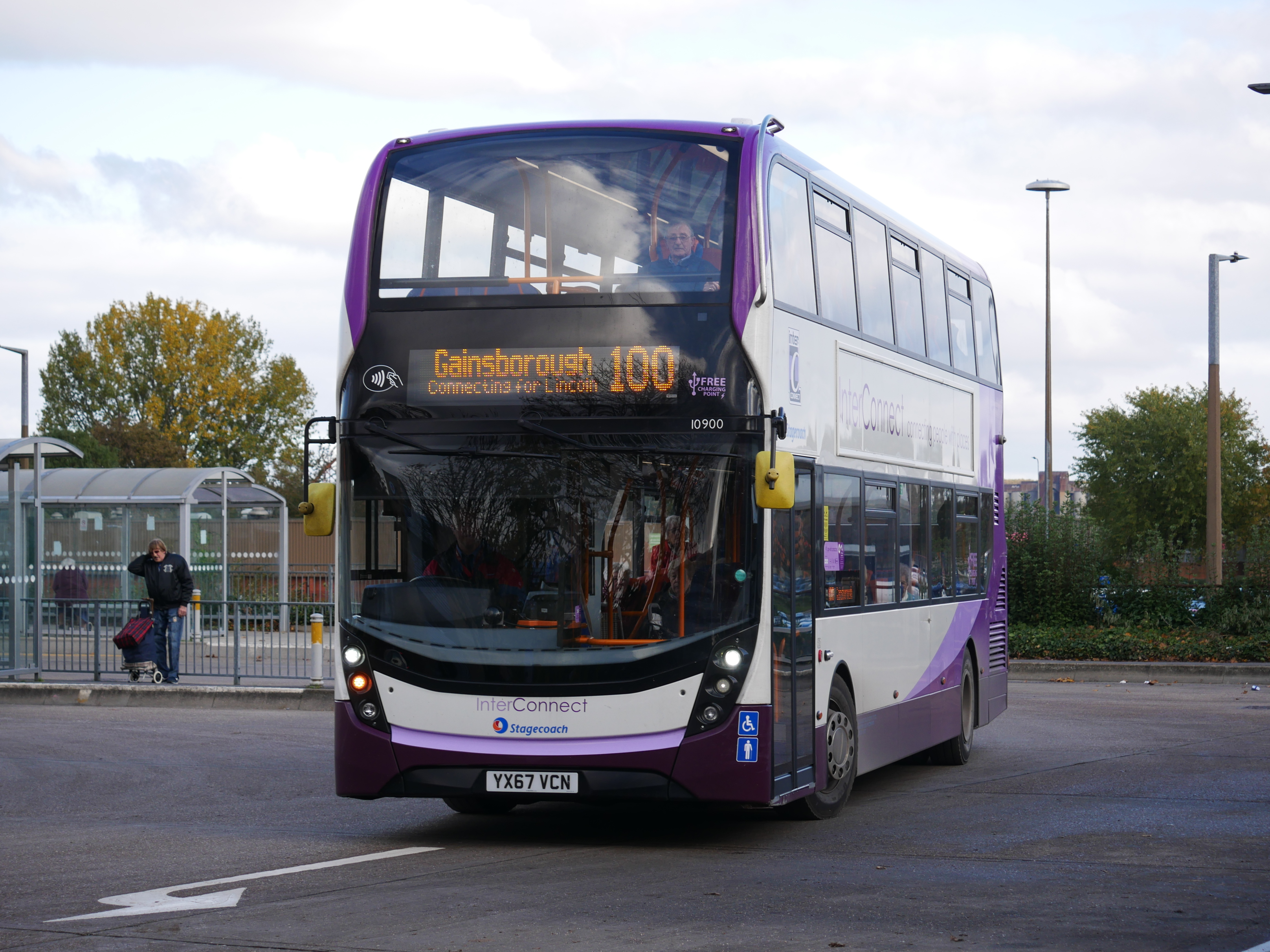
InterConnect Alexander Dennis Enviro400 MMC departing Scunthorpe bus station in October 2019

Stagecoach in Lincolnshire is the main operator of the 'InterConnect' service, a network of rural and interurban bus services around the county. Bus services operate to urban destinations such as Lincoln, Gainsborough, Skegness and Scunthorpe via the rural communities in between. Buses are painted in a purple livery based on the previous Stagecoach livery. The service is also jointly operated by Brylaine Travel.

=== Seasiders ===
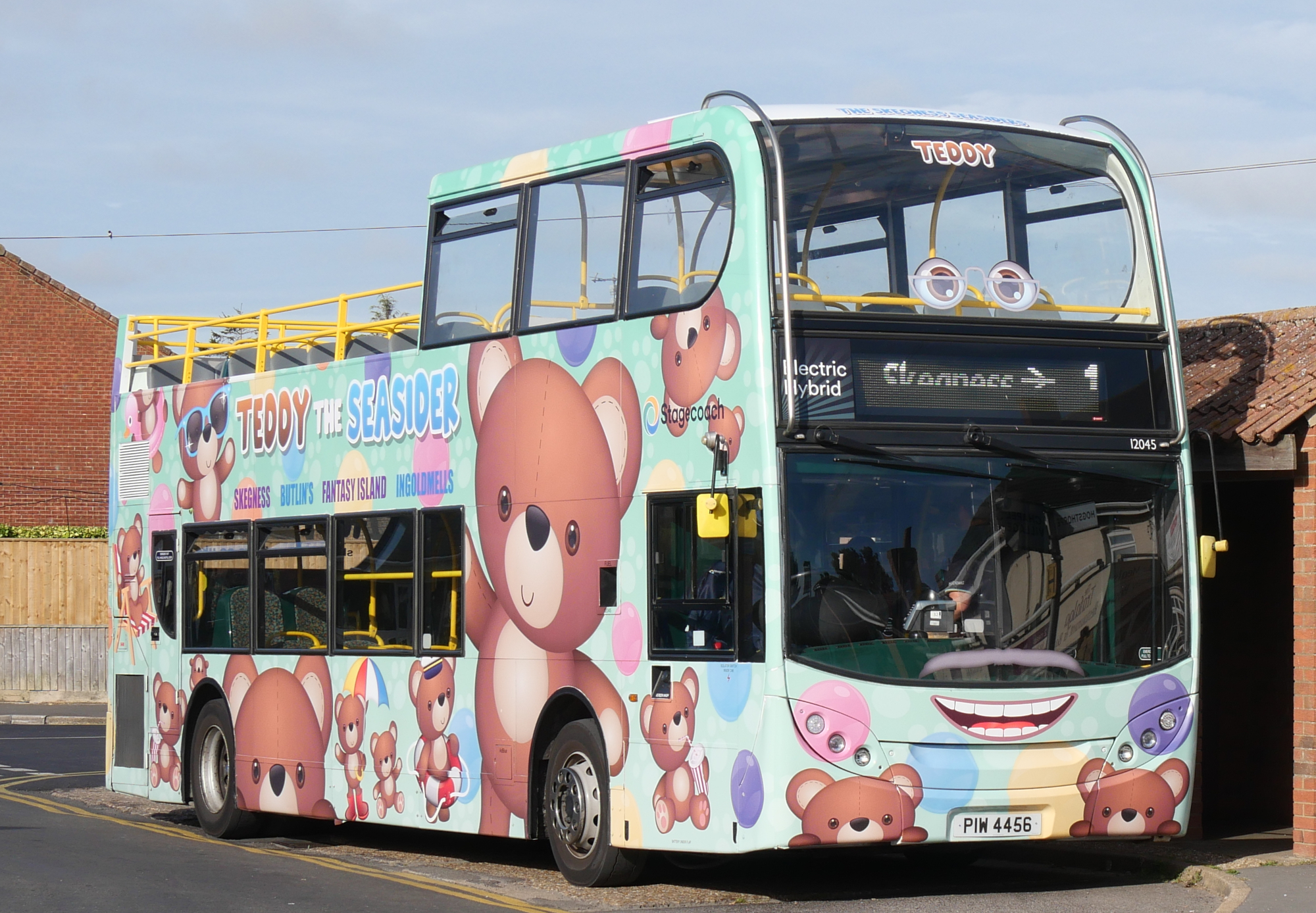
'Teddy' the Seasider, an Alexander Dennis Enviro400H, in Chapel St Leonards in August 2024

Stagecoach operates a number of 'Seasider' branded open top buses on both the Skegness and Cleethorpes seafronts.

In the RoadCar era, open-top Roadcar buses in Skegness were originally branded as 'The Open Topper', and consisted of various Leyland buses, before being replaced by MCW Metrobuses in 2004. Originally, the buses wore a livery of white, yellow and blue, similar in design to RoadCar's standard fleet livery, but in 1997, the open top livery was changed to yellow, red and blue.

After Lincolnshire RoadCar came under Stagecoach ownership, the open-top services were rebranded in 2007 as the 'Coastal Cruiser', with buses receiving a new livery as a result of this rebrand, however a few closed-top MCW Metrobuses also received this Coastal Cruiser livery. In 2010, the MCW Metrobuses were replaced by Alexander ALX400 bodied Dennis Trident 2 buses. The service was relaunched in April 2014 as the 'Skegness Seasider', with six Alexander ALX400 bodied Dennis Trident 2 buses refurbished in colourful liveries and named 'Rocky', 'Candy', 'Pierre', 'Shelly', 'Sandy' and 'Salty'. Two Wright Eclipse Gemini bodied Volvo B7TL buses named 'Rolly' and 'Milly' joined the fleet in 2015. In 2016, 'Rocky' was replaced by an open top Alexander Dennis Enviro400, coinciding with the introduction of the Cleethorpes Seasiders: two Wright Eclipse Gemini bodied Volvo B7TLs named 'Lolly' and 'Splash'.

Three more Alexander ALX400 bodied Dennis Trident 2 buses named 'Teddy', 'Sunny' and 'Sweetie' were added to the fleet in 2018, followed by a twelfth bus named Scoop in March 2022. The Skegness Seasider buses were replaced for the 2024 season with twelve Alexander Dennis Enviro400H hybrid electric buses transferred from Stagecoach Manchester, with two of the Seasiders, Milly and Pierre becoming closed top buses to allow them to run in the winter season as well as the summer season.

=== ThreeFifty ===
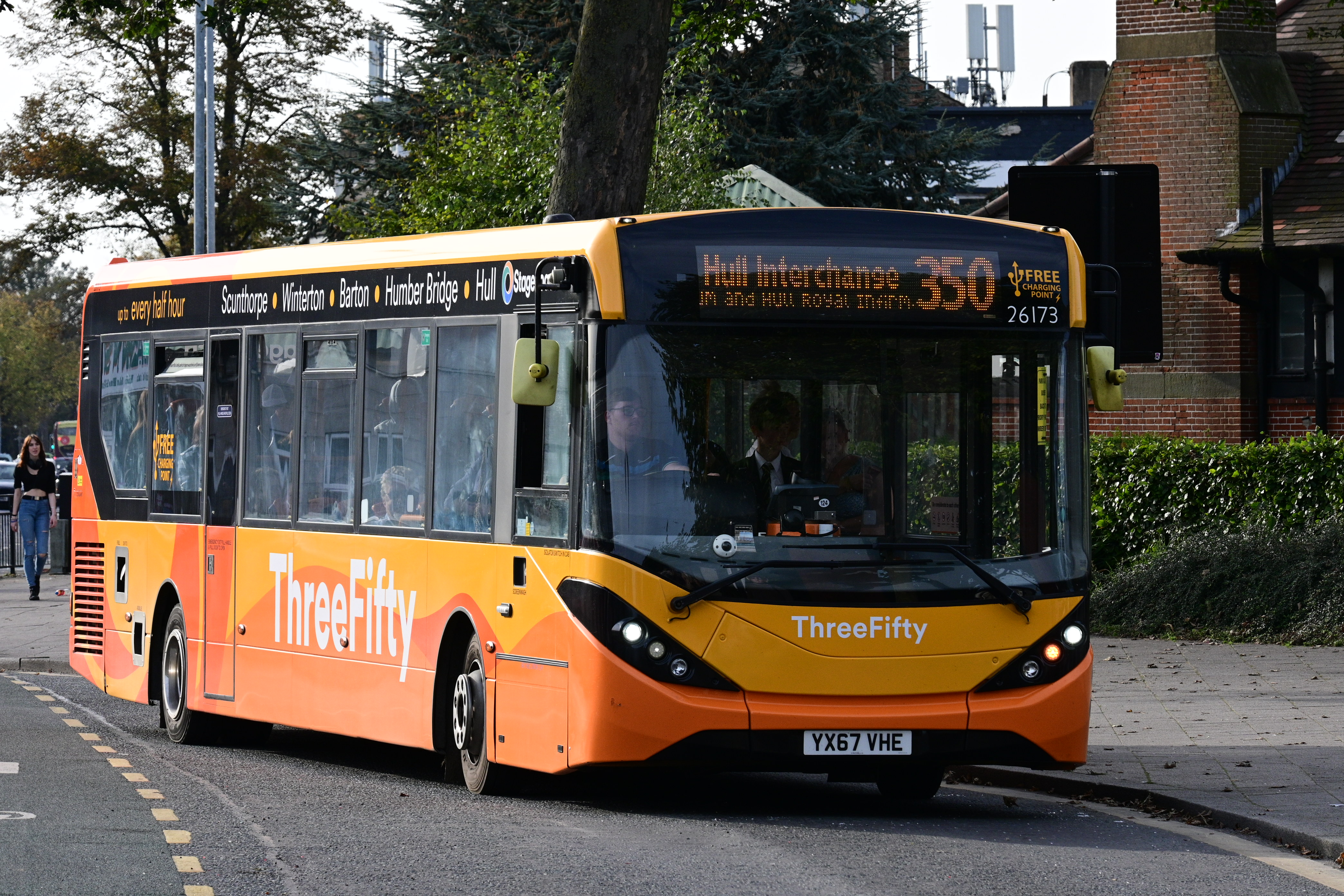
ThreeFifty Alexander Dennis Enviro200 MMC on Anlaby Road, Kingston upon Hull in October 2023

The ThreeFifty is a half-hourly cross-river bus service over the River Humber that connects Scunthorpe and Kingston upon Hull via the Humber Bridge and Barton-upon-Humber. The service was first operated as 'Humberlink' service 350 by both Lincolnshire RoadCar and East Yorkshire as National Bus Company subsidiaries, commencing operations on 24 June 1981 following the opening of the Humber Bridge and replacing the pre-existing Humber Ferry. The service was also operated by local independents Applebys of Conisholme and Hornsbys of Scunthorpe on Sundays.

The ThreeFifty was relaunched as the 'Humber FastCat' by Stagecoach in Lincolnshire in 2009, receiving an investment of six branded single-deckers, each of which carried a name on a special orange livery. The service was also launched as a joint operation with East Yorkshire, who operate a single bus independent of the Stagecoach fleet. The FastCat brand was later refreshed in 2014, in conjunction with the introduction of the sister 'Humber Flyer' service at Stagecoach Grimsby-Cleethorpes. Stagecoach later invested in a £1 million fleet of six new Alexander Dennis Enviro200 MMCs for the service in 2017, featuring USB charging and leather seating.

The service was rebranded to 'ThreeFifty' during the summer of 2023, with the 'Humber FastCat' Enviro200 MMCs being repainted into a revised orange livery.

== Incidents ==
On 11 April 2004, a Volvo B7TL double-decker bus with East Lancs Vyking bodywork operated by Lincolnshire RoadCar collided with a number of pedestrians outside the main entrance to Fantasy Island amusement park on Sea Lane in Ingoldmells. Five pedestrians were killed and six more injured, two critically, in the accident. Following the accident, RoadCar were found guilty of breaching safety provisions for allowing the driver to operate the vehicle type without proper training and for operating a vehicle with faulty brakes; as a result, they were fined £2,000 at Skegness Magistrates Court on 8 August 2005. The bus driver was found guilty of five counts of causing death by dangerous driving and a single count of driving without due care and attention, and was sentenced to five years of imprisonment on 9 November 2005.
