= St Mary's Catholic High School, Grimsby =

St Mary's Catholic School

Location
- Wootton Road; Grimsby, North East Lincolnshire, DN33 1HE; England
- Coordinates: 53°32′51″N 0°06′30″W

Information
- Type: Voluntary aided school
- Religious affiliation: Roman Catholic
- Closed: 2010
- Local authority: North East Lincolnshire
- Specialists: Humanities College, Language College
- Department for Education URN: 118118 Tables
- Ofsted: Reports
- Headteacher: Mr Richard Mellows
- Gender: Coeducational
- Age: 11 to 16
- Enrolment: 360
- Website: http://www.stmarys.tlfe.org

St Mary's Catholic School was a Roman Catholic secondary school located in Grimsby, Lincolnshire, England. The school closed at the end of the academic year in 2010, in preparation for its amalgamation with Matthew Humberstone School to form St Andrew's College, a joint faith school which opened in September 2010. This school was renamed Holy Family Catholic Academy, a solely a Roman Catholic school, but this closed and the site reopened as Beacon Academy in September 2017.

== Admissions ==
St Mary's accepted any student who wished to attend if they respected Catholicism. Two main sources of students were Catholic pupils from two Catholic primary schools - St Mary's on Wellington Street in East Marsh, and St Joseph's on Philip Avenue in Cleethorpes.

Grimsby is in the Diocese of Nottingham.

== History ==
St Mary's Secondary School was originally on a site shared with the Junior School and St Mary's Church in Henage Road. In 1965 a new Secondary School was opened and was situated in the middle of the Nunsthorpe council estate in west Grimsby. It closed on 20 July 2010, merging with Matthew Humberstone school to become St Andrew's College in September 2010. St Andrew's College, based at the Matthew Humberstone Upper site on Chatsworth Place, in turn became the Holy Family Catholic Academy, and was again transformed in 2017, this time into the Beacon Academy.

== Churches nearby ==
St Mary's Church is on Heneage Road near St Mary's primary school. There is also St Pius X catholic church on Chelmsford Avenue in Grange, just north of the school.

== Academic results ==
In 2009 the school came joint 7th in North East Lincolnshire, gaining 35% A* - C's. It did not have a sixth form.
