= Scartho Top =

Housing development in Grimsby, Lincolnshire, England

Coordinates: 53.541°N 0.103°W

Scartho Top is a development of houses in the south Grimsby area of North East Lincolnshire, England. The idea for such a development appeared in the Grimsby local plan towards the end of the 1960s, although construction did not start until the mid-1990s. The aim is to eventually build 2,100 houses in an area of 169 acres (0.68 km^{2}), with a population of 7,000. A further 40-plus acres has been designated as open space. There are plans to have a separate community with village shops, a school and possibly a public house, in the next few years. Phase one of the project provided over 500 houses in the northern part of the development. Construction company Redrow is in the process of building 315 houses while Linden Homes (formerly Stamford Homes) is constructing 170.

Cyden Homes has been given permission to build 74 homes at the southern edge of the development next to Springfield Sports Ground. Residents of the Springfield Road area have signed a petition objecting to the move because the spine road earmarked for construction traffic will not be ready when the work starts. Instead construction vehicles will access the site via Springfield Road and Meadow Drive, which residents fear will create dangers for pedestrians.

In 2010 it was announced that the planned village centre for Scartho Top – complete with shops, play areas and a public house – could begin as early as 2015. Local landowner, Brocklesby Estate, said that to achieve a sustainable village centre it is estimated that 50 per cent of the houses will have to be built and occupied. With the current rates of development and house sales this is expected to be achieved in approximately five years.

Comprising open farm land, Scartho Top was historically part of Scartho, included within the parish's North-West field. Under an inclosure act of 1798 this land was distributed between various individuals, with the largest awards going to local dignitaries Charles Lord Yarborough and George Tennyson. When the Great Grimsby Waterworks Company opened its pumping station at Little Coates in 1863, a reservoir was established in the Scartho Top area. Also situated in the area was Scartho Top farm which, like the reservoir, no longer exists. Scartho ceased to be a separate entity in 1928 when it became part of Grimsby. Scartho Top now forms part of the Scartho ward of North East Lincolnshire Council.

On its northern edge is the Nunsthorpe Estate. In the early days of the development it was possible for pedestrians to walk between Utgard Way on Scartho Top and Crosby Road in Nunsthorpe, using a short link road. There were suggestions that this road might at some time be used for access by emergency vehicles, although general traffic would be prohibited. However the link is currently sealed off and there is no direct access between the two estates.

To the east is the Diana, Princess of Wales Hospital and Pelham Avenue, to the south is the Springfield Estate, while on its western edge lies the drain that forms the boundary between Grimsby and the parish of Bradley. This boundary marks the extent of the planned development. Part of the old public footpath (linking Scartho Road with Bradley village), which runs through Scartho Top, has been preserved and incorporated into the development.
