= Nunsthorpe =

Area of Grimsby, Lincolnshire, England

Coordinates: 53.548646°N 0.108044°W

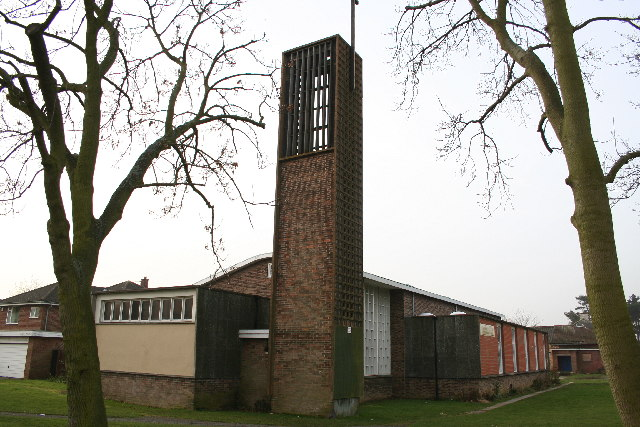
- St Marks, Nunsthorpe

- Location within Lincolnshire
- OS grid reference: TA254074
  - London: 142 mi (229 km) S
- Unitary authority: North East Lincolnshire
- Ceremonial county: Lincolnshire
- Region: Yorkshire and the Humber
- Country: England
- Sovereign state: United Kingdom
- Post town: Grimsby
- Postcode district: DN33
- Police: Humberside
- Fire: Humberside
- Ambulance: East Midlands
- UK Parliament: Great Grimsby and Cleethorpes

Nunsthorpe (known locally as 'The Nunny') is a suburb and housing estate in the western part of Grimsby, North East Lincolnshire, England. It is situated between Laceby Road (A46) and Scartho Road (A1243), which respectively form its northern and eastern boundaries. The population is listed in the South ward of the North East Lincolnshire Unitary Council.

There are over 2,400 homes on the estate, mostly former council properties now owned by the Lincolnshire Housing Partnership. There is a small area belonging to the Havelok/Northern Counties housing associations and a small area of private sector housing. There are a number of privately owned former council houses purchased under the Right to Buy scheme.

The pre-Second World War development in the eastern part of the estate is known as Old Nunsthorpe while the post-war development is called New Nunsthorpe. To the west lies the Bradley Park Estate which contains around 430 dwellings, also mostly LHP properties. The combined population of Nunsthorpe and Bradley Park is approximately 8,000.

To the north, on the other side of Laceby Road, is the Grange Estate and on the eastern boundary, in Scartho Road, was Grimsby Swimming Pool, which closed and was subsequently demolished. The Scartho Top private housing estate lies to the south. Nunsthorpe and Bradley Park are part of the Grimsby South ward of North East Lincolnshire unitary authority. The two estates are also within the area served by the South ward neighbourhood team of Humberside Police, based at the police station on Laceby Road.

In 2010 improvements to Nunsthorpe were acknowledged by the environmental campaign group Keep Britain Tidy. A quality mark was awarded after an independent assessment of improvement work undertaken on the estate by Shoreline and partners, Humberside Police and North East Lincolnshire Council, with the assistance of residents.

== Origins ==
Although built in the 20th century, Nunsthorpe takes its name from the nuns who once inhabited the priory of Saint Leonard. This stood at modern day Nuns Corner, where Scartho Road joins Laceby Road. "Thorpe" was an old word for hamlet or village. The priory was dissolved by Henry VIII in 1539. In later years the land was occupied by Nuns Farm, until its demolition in 1935. In 1944 Grimsby College, now called The Grimsby Institute of Further and Higher Education, acquired the site.

Situated at the southern edge of Grimsby (before the boundary extensions), for centuries the land where Nunsthorpe now stands was farmed using the open field system of agriculture. Lying mainly within the town of Grimsby it stretched westward from the priory, as far as the boundary with Bradley parish and southward, beyond the boundary with the parish of Scartho. Under enclosure awards of 1798 (in Scartho) and 1840 (in Grimsby), this land was acquired by successive Lords Yarborough.

== Old Nunsthorpe ==
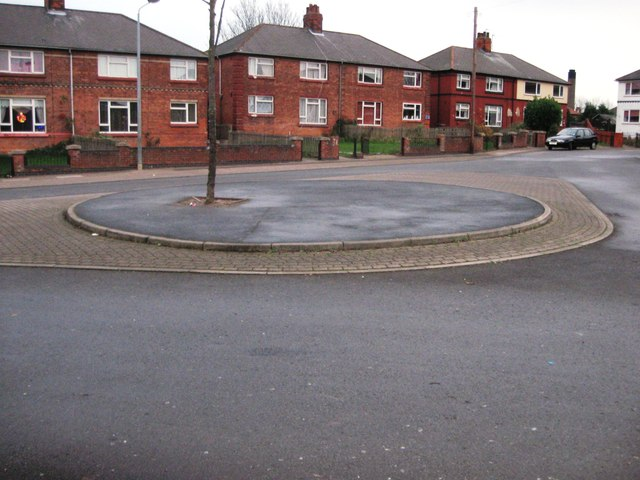
Dame Kendal Grove

Following the end of the First World War decent homes were needed for the returning servicemen. House building was started by Grimsby County Borough Council in 1920, on land bought from Lord Yarborough. Originally called the Laceby Road Site until 1923 the new Nunsthorpe housing estate, with its modern conveniences and large gardens was, as previously mentioned, also known as Garden City.

Most of the streets in this early development, built during the 1920s and 1930s, were named after notable people – Burns, Byron, Kingsley, Leighton, Newton, Walton groves; Milton Road and Shelley Avenue. Dame Kendal Grove was named after a Grimsby-born actress while Sutcliffe Avenue was named after Jack Sutcliffe, a previous mayor of Grimsby.

Saint Martin's Mission Church, a wooden building, was built during 1922 in Sutcliffe Avenue; this was replaced by a new church in 1937. There is still a structure on this site which is currently the base for Grimsby Judo Club. The first shops, including a post office, were built in Second Avenue during 1927–28 and a bus service (route 3) was introduced from Grimsby town centre to Nunsthorpe in 1928. In later years this service was extended to Cleethorpes.

Also in 1928 the greater part of Scartho was absorbed by Grimsby, which brought the whole of the present Nunsthorpe area under the control of Grimsby council. At the same time part of Bradley parish was acquired on which the Bradley Park Estate would eventually be built.

Nunsthorpe's population was further increased when, resulting from the Housing Act 1930, slum clearance was carried out in the Grimsby town centre and the residents were moved to new houses on the estate. By 1939 around 700 houses had been built in Nunsthorpe.

Nunsthorpe School was opened on Sutcliffe Avenue in 1931; previously children from the estate had been bussed to a school in another part of the town. It was two schools housed within one building, one for junior and one for senior pupils. By 1952 all the senior children had been transferred to a new school in Chelmsford Avenue.

During the late 1920s a maternity hospital was established in Second Avenue using converted council houses. This was incorporated into a new building which opened in 1933. In 1943 a number of people were killed and houses were damaged when butterfly bombs were dropped on the estate during a German air raid on Grimsby.

== New Nunsthorpe and Bradley Park ==
The absorption of Scartho into Grimsby made available more land for house building. The pre-1928 boundary between Grimsby and Scartho ran past the Scartho Road Institution (now part of the Diana, Princess of Wales Hospital) to what is the present-day rear gate of the hospital grounds at the end of Second Avenue, next to the resource centre.

From there it continued westward through fields that would eventually become part of the New Nunsthorpe council housing development. It ran south of what is now Redbourne Road, crossed Winchester Avenue, ran to the north of Kirkstead Crescent, along Scawby Road until it reached Stainton Drive. The amalgamation made this boundary obsolete.

In this post-Second World War New Nunsthorpe development the streets were mostly named after Lincolnshire villages, with the exception of Winchester Avenue and a few streets in an area of private housing, which were named after historic English towns. The development included the single-storey prefabricated buildings (prefabs), which were built in 1946 to help alleviate the housing shortage.

In 1947 a large wooden hut was purchased and erected in Burwell Drive. This became the estate's earliest community centre, opened in 1949, at the same time the Nunsthorpe's first community association was formed. In 1951 saw the Nunsthorpe Nursery School opened, and in 1952 the branch library in Wootton Road was established.

In 1963 the Viking Superstore, which had been converted from three smaller shops into one self-service supermarket, was opened in Second Avenue. Coronation Street stars Pat Phoenix and Philip Lowrie addressed an estimated crowd of 5,000 people in the open air before the official opening

During the late 1970s the Bradley Park Estate was built on land between Stainton Drive and the Bradley Recreation Ground. This land had once been part of Bradley parish. Some place names in Bradley Park, such as Bremerhaven Way, reflect Grimsby's links with its twin town, although Wymark View was named after the actor who was born in nearby Cleethorpes. The development also included Crosby School (now called Woodlands).

== Improvement schemes and resident consultation ==
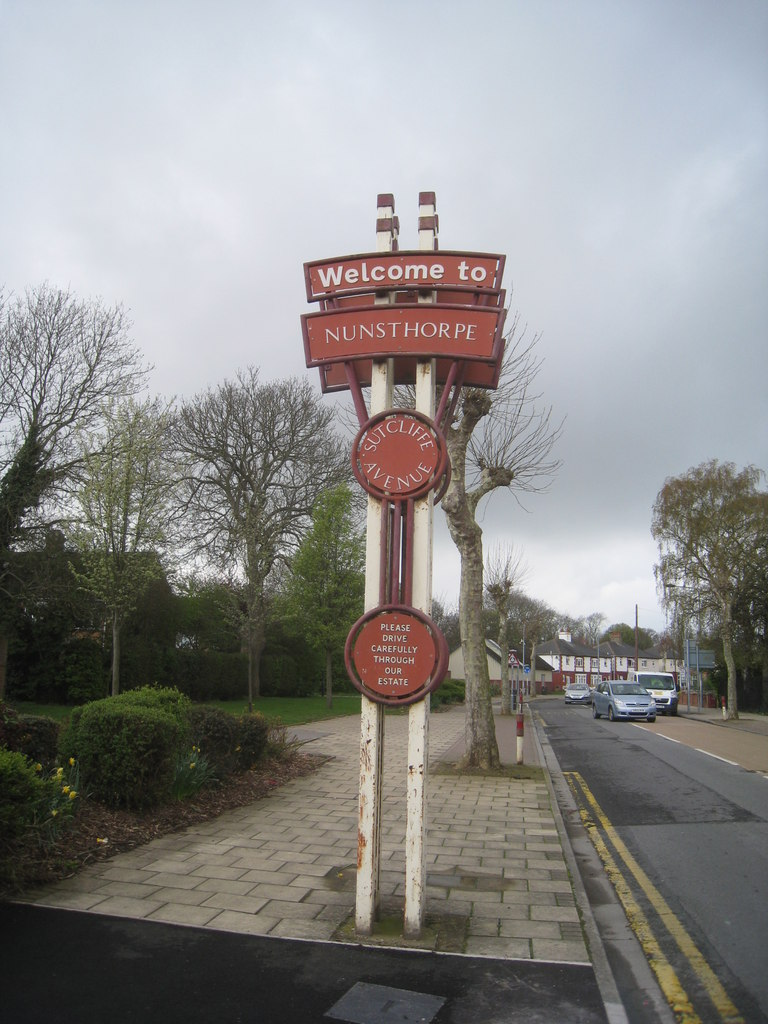
Welcome to Nunsthorpe sign

In 1992, for purposes of resident consultation, Grimsby borough council, then a district of Humberside County Council, divided the area into four neighbourhoods. Because of its size New Nunsthorpe was split into two neighbourhoods – Nunsthorpe Central and Nunsthorpe West, while Old Nunsthorpe and Bradley Park formed the remaining two. Each area had a steering committee.

At that time discussions were taking place on the possibility of setting up a tenant management organisation in each neighbourhood. Independent housing consultants, Priority Estates Project, were brought in to canvass the views of residents but nothing developed from this idea.

In 1994 the Department for the Environment approved multimillion-pound funding for Nunsthorpe and Bradley Park. This Estate Action scheme allowed for internal improvements to council houses and general improvements, such as better street lighting, the provision of off-road parking facilities and dropped kerbs for the convenience of wheelchair users. It also included the installation of traffic calming measures.

All the prefabs of aluminium construction were renovated and are still in use. However, most of the prefabs containing asbestos were demolished between 1994 and 1997. Of the original 181 such prefabs only three owner-occupied ones now remain. Local housing association, Havelok and the Northern Counties housing association, were allocated part of the vacant prefab land for the construction of properties. Some of the land remained empty, part of it forming the open grassed area situated between Burwell Drive and Winchester Avenue.

=== Consultative forum ===
The Nunsthorpe and Bradley Park Consultative Forum, established in 1992 to co-ordinate the neighbourhood steering groups, was reorganised and became directly elected by a postal ballot of residents at two yearly periods.

The reconstituted forum held its inaugural meeting in 1995, with annual general meetings being held thereafter. In addition to the delegates elected from 13 areas (later reduced to six), ward councillors and council officers also attended meetings of the main committee and sub-committees. The forum was dissolved in 2004.

The forum had three sub-committees, one being the Economic, Social and Cultural Development sub-committee (ESCD). Another sub-committee dealt with council tenant issues only, while the third concerned itself with wider estate action improvements, which affected tenants and homeowners. As circumstances changed, these sub-committees were gradually merged with the main committee.

Representatives from local churches, schools, the police and other bodies were invited to attend ESCD meetings as observers. Along with various local agencies, the ESCD had delegates on the project team charged with establishing a resource centre on the estate.

When the Sutcliffe Special School moved to a new site at Humberston, the empty building in Second Avenue was acquired from the local council at a nominal rent. Resident volunteers helped to clean and decorate the building, transforming it into the new Nunsthorpe and Bradley Park Resource Centre. The project was funded initially from the Single Regeneration Budget, although the aim was for the centre eventually to become self-financing.

Two residents associations, Bradley Park and Nunsthorpe Central, which existed between 1993 and 1999, sent voting delegates to the forum. These associations had replaced the steering committees for their respective neighbourhoods. They were also closely involved with the establishment of the resource centre. Previously operating from members' homes, when the centre opened in 1995 the associations were able to establish permanent headquarters there.

Attempts to set up resident associations in Old Nunsthorpe and Nunsthorpe West were unsuccessful; however, from 1996 Old Nunsthorpe and Nunsthorpe Central residents began holding joint meetings. A Nunsthorpe and Bradley Park Youth Association (now defunct) was established in 1996, supervised by the two adult associations. National Lottery funding enabled this organisation to employ a full-time youth worker based at the resource centre.

During 1997, disillusionment among some residents on Bradley Park led to the brief formation of a second association there, in opposition to the existing resident group. Also in that year, some people, who were dissatisfied with the Nunsthorpe Central Association, established the short-lived Nunsthorpe South Association.

=== Council housing stock transfer ===
In 2004 tenants in North East Lincolnshire were balloted on whether the council housing stock should be transferred to a housing association. Transfer would release money that was unavailable to the council for improvements to properties. After a "yes" vote the remaining council houses on the two estates (around 1,600), together with the rest of the authority's housing stock, were transferred to the new locally based Shoreline Housing Partnership in March 2005.

Shoreline tenants on the estates sent two delegates to the Boroughwide Tenant Assembly. One delegate represented Nunsthorpe East and Nunsthorpe Central while the other represented Nunsthorpe West and Bradley Park. The Assembly was later disbanded.

Shoreline undertook a programme of investment in the transferred properties over a period of ten years and is currently in the process of implementing this programme. Planned home improvements include, where necessary, modern kitchens, bathrooms, central heating, decent roofs, security doors and windows, as well as smoke alarms. However, there are still parts of Nunsthorpe where it is difficult to attract tenants and houses remain boarded up.

== Community organisations ==
The Nunsthorpe and Bradley Park Residents and Tenants Association was established in 2005, later changing its name to the Nunsthorpe and Bradley Park Community Trust. It opened a charity shop in Second Avenue, provided by the neighbouring Co-op shop at a nominal rent and staffed by volunteers from the estate. The shop closed in 2012, with the Trust blaming lack of support from funding organisations as the reason.

During its time the premises hosted a single-parent club, photographic club, dancing and bingo. Money was raised to help fund the children's ward at the Diana, Princess of Wales Hospital, Nunsthorpe Community School, the Side Door Youth Club (based at Laceby Road Methodist Church), also the Nunsthorpe and Bradley Park Football Club. The Trust received a number of awards and commendations for its charity work.

The Nunsthorpe Tenants and Residents Association was formed in 2006 and was involved in combating anti-social behaviour on the estate. It joined the campaign to restore the Nunsthorpe Recreation Ground following damage by vandals. Working with the Saint Martins Action Group (later Nunsthorpe Together) Nunsthorpe TARA provided a float for the 2006 Cleethorpes Carnival. During its existence the organisation arranged various outdoor activities for local children. It disbanded in 2013.

The Nunsthorpe and Bradley Park Community Partnership was an umbrella group that included the Nunsthorpe Community Centre, Nunsthorpe TARA, the Respect Funhouse and the Second Avenue Resource Centre. It entered three floats in the 2009 Cleethorpes Carnival, coming second in one section and joint first in another section.

In 2003 a quarterly magazine called Livewire was introduced. Livewire gave news and views from around Nunsthorpe and Bradley Park. It incorporated the resource centre newsletter, Nunsthorpe and Bradley Park Matters, which had been regularly distributed to houses in the area since 1995. The magazine relied on funding and this eventually came to an end. The last edition appeared in 2008.

The Second Avenue Resource Centre (formerly the Nunsthorpe and Bradley Park Resource Centre) opened in 1995 to provide services and support to the estate's residents. In 2014, the centre relocated and reopened under a new name: Centre4. Centre4 is the largest community organisation in North East Lincolnshire, with over 1,100 people visiting each week. It is described as a 'vibrant community hub' and its management board includes residents of the estate. The centre's services include social prescribing support via its inhouse health and wellbeing team, a specialist advice team who help residents of the entire borough over the phone and in-person, and a not-for-profit employment arm: Ethical Recruitment Agency (ERA). It also hosts dozens of other charities and community organisations, such as Climb4, Creating Positive Opportunity and the local branches of Alzheimers Society and the Red Cross. It is located adjacent to Nunnys Farm, a community farm and charity open to the general public. Inside the venue, there is also the Community Cafe and Community Shop, which sell discounted meals and groceries respectively.

On 18 May 2024, the centre reopened its ground floor welcome zone with a new coffee bar, alongside modernised decor, a public living room, contemporary furniture and soundproof booths for confidential conversations.

South Ward Partnership, which includes Nunsthorpe, Bradley Park and the Grange Estate, is composed of residents and representatives from various agencies, working to improve conditions on the estates. Membership of the partnership is open to all residents of the ward aged 16 and over. Non-residents with an interest in the area may attend meetings without voting rights. It meets at various venues within the ward area.

The Hands Together Youth Group, based on the estate, put together shoe boxes full of essential items and sent them to the children of Romania for Christmas 2010. In 2011 they decided to do something for the men and women serving in the armed forces. They handed over 20 shoeboxes full of items such as toothpaste, shampoo and aftershave, to the Pink Berets fundraising group, for the troops in Afghanistan.

In 2011 a street party was held on the estate to celebrate the wedding of Prince William and Catherine Middleton. At the event, held in Redbourne Road, youngsters became princes and princesses for a day. Dressed in costumes made by event organiser Mary Stuart, children from the estate recreated the royal wedding ceremony.

Nunsthorpe resident, Doreen White, was awarded an MBE in the Queen's Birthday Honours for services to education while working at Franklin College. She had dedicated her working life to the college, first as a cleaner and later as a social area supervisor. The estate's residents put their own mark on the 2012 Olympic celebrations. Local schoolchildren designed a paper version of the Olympic Torch, which was carried through the estate, culminating in a ceremony at Nunsthorpe Community School.

ITV screened a programme in its Exposure series. A TV crew rented a house in Nunsthorpe for three months and spent the summer of 2012 filming the positive and negative aspects of life on the estate

Nunsthorpe and Bradley Park Community Association is based at a purpose-built community centre in Wootton Road. Activities include bingo and auctions. The centre was opened in 1985 by local snooker celebrity Ray Edmonds. In 2007 the association received £14,320 from the Neighbourhood Renewal Fund and Millennium Inorganic Chemicals. The money paid for alterations to the centre's ceiling, repairs to the heating system and the installation of safety glass in the doors and windows. In 2012 the centre was the scene of a disturbance involving local youths.

Nunsthorpe Together was composed of representatives from the church, police and North East Lincolnshire Council. In 2008 it took over control of the Respect Funhouse from the Saint Martins Action Group. During its existence the Action Group staged local productions of Abbamania and Dancemania at the Grimsby Auditorium, both involving local children from North East Lincolnshire.

Action Group members supported by a local police inspector and the Rector of Grimsby, appeared on the TV show Fortune: Million Pound Giveaway, appealing for funds to turn part of Saint Martin's church into a children's activity centre. The panel awarded them £45,000, while a further £330,000 came from the Neighbourhood Renewal Fund. The project was officially opened in 2008. The Respect Funhouse had a Laser Quest arena, a multi-screen video jukebox and a maze of play areas – tunnels, slides, ball pools and climbing areas – also music rooms and quiet rooms where teenagers and children could do their homework.

In 2008 young dancers from the Funhouse performed their fourth show, Musical Mania, at the Auditorium. The dancers stage regular events at the Beachcomber venue in Humberston. In 2009 the High Sheriff of Lincolnshire, Lady Sarah McCorquodale, handed a Tribune Trust award for £1,000 to the Funhouse. The Trust supports community projects tackling crime, disorder and deprivation. The Funhouse decided to spend the money on T-shirts for its street dance teams.

Also in 2009 the Big Lottery Fund awarded a £444.544 grant to Nunsthorpe Together for a go-carting project called "wheels". In 2010 the Funhouse building was closed until money could be found for repairs, although the neighbouring hall continued to be used for bingo and dance classes. In 2011, following requests from the local community, the church, police and local council representatives resigned and residents took full control of the board after concerns regarding finances were raised by the community. After having all the locks changed in the night a dispute over access to the hall led to a demonstration by some residents outside the Funhouse.

In 2012 Nunsthorpe Together put on a show in the Easter and summer school holidays. The summer show was filmed by ITV and shown on national TV. To date, this group has been awarded nine national Home Office awards, one regional award and numerous local awards. In 2013 the parochial church council took back control of the church hall after a dispute over rental payments. Nunsthorpe Together now holds bingo and dance classes at the Grange Community Centre.

== Education ==
The Nunsthorpe and Bradley Park Children's Centre in Sutcliffe Avenue (formed in 2004 by the combination of the Sure Start Centre and Nunsthorpe Nursery School) and the Woodlands Acorns Daycare Centre on Bradley Park, provide support for the estates' younger children. There is also the Butterflies Day Nursery, which began in 2000 as a creche, based at the resource centre. In 2002 it became a day nursery and in 2008 it relocated to the children's centre. In 2012 the centre received outstanding recognition from the inspection body Ofsted for providing care for children and young people in the area.

Primary education is provided by the Oasis Academy Nunsthorpe, sometimes known as OAN (formerly Nunsthorpe Community School, situated next to the Children's Centre) and Woodlands Primary School in Pinewood Crescent, Bradley Park. Both schools became the first primary schools in Britain to achieve Centre of Excellence status for their use of interactive whiteboards. Nunsthorpe Community School (now OAN) was created in 2001 by the merger of the Nunsthorpe infants and junior schools. In 2010 Nunsthorpe Community School (now OAN) pupils baked and sold more than 500 cakes, raising £333.60 for their chosen charity Oxfam

The estate is also close to Oasis Academy Wintringham, a secondary education provider, of which many children on the estate attend. It is also close to schools Ormiston Maritime Academy and Tollbar Academy.

In 1990 the Crosby first and middle schools changed their name to Bradley Park first and middle. During the 1995 summer holiday a fire, caused by a wiring fault, badly damaged some of the classrooms, making them unusable. Temporary mobile classrooms were brought in for the new term until the fire damage could be repaired. In 1999 the two schools amalgamated, undergoing another change of name to Woodlands Primary School. It was the first school in the country to introduce the five-term year.

Saint Mary's Catholic High School (established 1966) was located in Wootton Road. Saint Mary's agreed to merge with Matthew Humberstone Church of England School, Cleethorpes to form a new joint church school. In 2009 the council's planning committee supported the outline application to build a completely new school, called Saint Andrew's College, on the Matthew Humberstone site. Saint Mary's closed in July 2010 and the pupils were moved to an existing site at Matthew Humberston to begin the new term in September 2010, pending the completion of the new school building.

Various proposals have been put forward by residents on what should be done with the empty school building. The Second Avenue Resource Centre is applying for funding so that it can move into the building, which is three times the size of the present resource centre. It is hoped that the larger premises will attract more social enterprise groups, alternative sports groups, a stage for theatrical productions and a conference facility.

Three educational professionals also applied to open a free school on the premises, to be called the Lighthouse Community School, catering for excluded children and those who struggle with mainstream education. While there was some public support for the project the application was rejected by the Department for Education because it did not meet the published criteria.

In 2004 The Grimsby Institute bought and renovated a disused part of the Nunsthorpe school complex in Sutcliffe Avenue. In 2006 this opened as the institute's Nunsthorpe Community Campus which houses animal care, building construction and horticulture courses. Its leisure facilities are available for public use.

The Nunsthorpe branch library was relocated and its facilities are now based at the Sutcliffe Avenue college site, under a partnership arrangement between the Institute and North East Lincolnshire Council (the old library building is now occupied by the Primal community gymnasium). As well as holding academic stock for students, there is a selection of novels, non-fiction and talking books available for all ages. The library also has an internet cafe for public use.

There is also an ongoing local history project where members of the public are encouraged to donate photographs of Nunsthorpe to the library's collection.

The estate was the home of educationalist and poet, the late Charles Brian Cox, founder and director of the literary journal Critical Quarterly; also Irish national poet laureate and Forward Prize winner Sam Gardiner. The estate has an active poetry group.

== Religion ==
Between 1988 and 2008 estate churches Saint Martin's, (consecrated in 1937), Saint Mark's (1959), both Church of England and Laceby Road Methodist (1970), together with Saint Pius X Roman Catholic Church on the Grange Estate, co-operated to provide a weekly 'pop-in' club at the Nunsthorpe Community Centre. Apart from the social aspects of the club large sums of money were raised for various charities. In 2008 this facility was taken over by the community centre itself. Another church, Grimsby Baptist (1960) is sited on Laceby Road and there is a Jewish cemetery situated near First Avenue and Cornwell Close. This was consecrated in 1896 thus pre-dating the estate. Laceby Road Methodist Church closed in 2010 due to dwindling numbers attending and vandalism, although the Side Door Church, which shares the premises, continues to work with young people in the area

== Facilities ==
The Diana, Princess of Wales Hospital borders Nunsthorpe. In 2004 the maternity hospital in Second Avenue closed and its facilities were transferred to new premises in the hospital grounds. The vacated building was demolished and in 2008 Orchard Care Homes opened two residential units, one specialising in dementia care, on the site. The Grimsby Community Clinic is in Kingsley Grove. There are shopping areas in Second Avenue, Sutcliffe Avenue and Bradley Park.

The Nunsthorpe Business Units are in Winchester Avenue; these were built in 1994 to help residents set up their own enterprises. There is a public house called the Nunsthorpe Tavern and a recreation ground, both in Sutcliffe Avenue. The Nunsthorpe Recreation Ground has been improved with new play equipment being installed, some being accessible to wheelchair users.

Bus route number 12 operates from Bradley Park to Grimsby town centre, Cleethorpes and New Waltham, while route 3 runs from Bradley Cross Roads through Nunsthorpe, linking it with Grimsby town centre and Cleethorpes. Both services are provided by Stagecoach Grimsby-Cleethorpes.

Adjacent to Bradley Park is the Bradley Recreation Ground, with its state-of-the-art community sports stadium, home to amateur sides Grimsby Borough and Cleethorpes Town football clubs. Residents in neighbouring Bradley village expressed concern that the facility could turn into a huge stadium when plans were announced to extend the car park and install a speaker system. Nearby are the Local Nature Reserves of Dixon and Bradley Wood. According to legend the latter is haunted by the Black Lady of Bradley Woods.
