= Stagecoach East Midlands =

Bus operator in the East Midlands, England

- Parent: Stagecoach Group
- Founded: 1989; 37 years ago
- Headquarters: Lincoln
- Service area: Kingston upon Hull; East Riding of Yorkshire; Lincolnshire; Nottinghamshire; South Yorkshire
- Service type: Bus and coach
- Depots: 8
- Fuel type: Diesel and electric
- Managing Director: Matt Cranwell
- Website: https://www.stagecoachbus.com/about/east-midlands

Stagecoach East Midlands is a bus operator providing local and regional services across the East Midlands, the city of Kingston upon Hull and Lincolnshire. The company is a subsidiary of the Stagecoach Group.

The company is headquartered and registered in Lincoln, and is registered under 6 sub-division brands: Stagecoach in Bassetlaw, Stagecoach in Mansfield, Stagecoach Grimsby-Cleethorpes, Stagecoach in Hull, Stagecoach in Lincolnshire and Stagecoach in Newark.

== Services ==
=== East Midlands ===
Stagecoach first entered the East Midlands with the purchase of former National Bus Company subsidiary East Midland Motor Services in 1989, following a bus war which was condemned by local Labour MPs in a Parliamentary early day motion. In 1995, Stagecoach East Midlands went on to acquire employee-owned former municipal operator Chesterfield Transport, the combined Chesterfield operation later being transferred to Stagecoach Yorkshire. While Stagecoach East Midlands was reorganised to integrate Stagecoach in Lincolnshire and Kingston upon Hull under one business headquartered in Lincoln in 2006, the Chesterfield operation was transferred to Stagecoach Yorkshire, resulting in the closure of Stagecoach's divisional head office in the town.

Services are currently run under the Stagecoach in Bassetlaw and Stagecoach in Mansfield subsidiaries, operating services in Worksop and Mansfield respectively, as well as surrounding areas. Stagecoach in Mansfield are also home to the Pronto inter-town express service, operating between Chesterfield, Mansfield and Nottingham, formerly run in a joint operation with trentbarton.

=== Lincolnshire ===
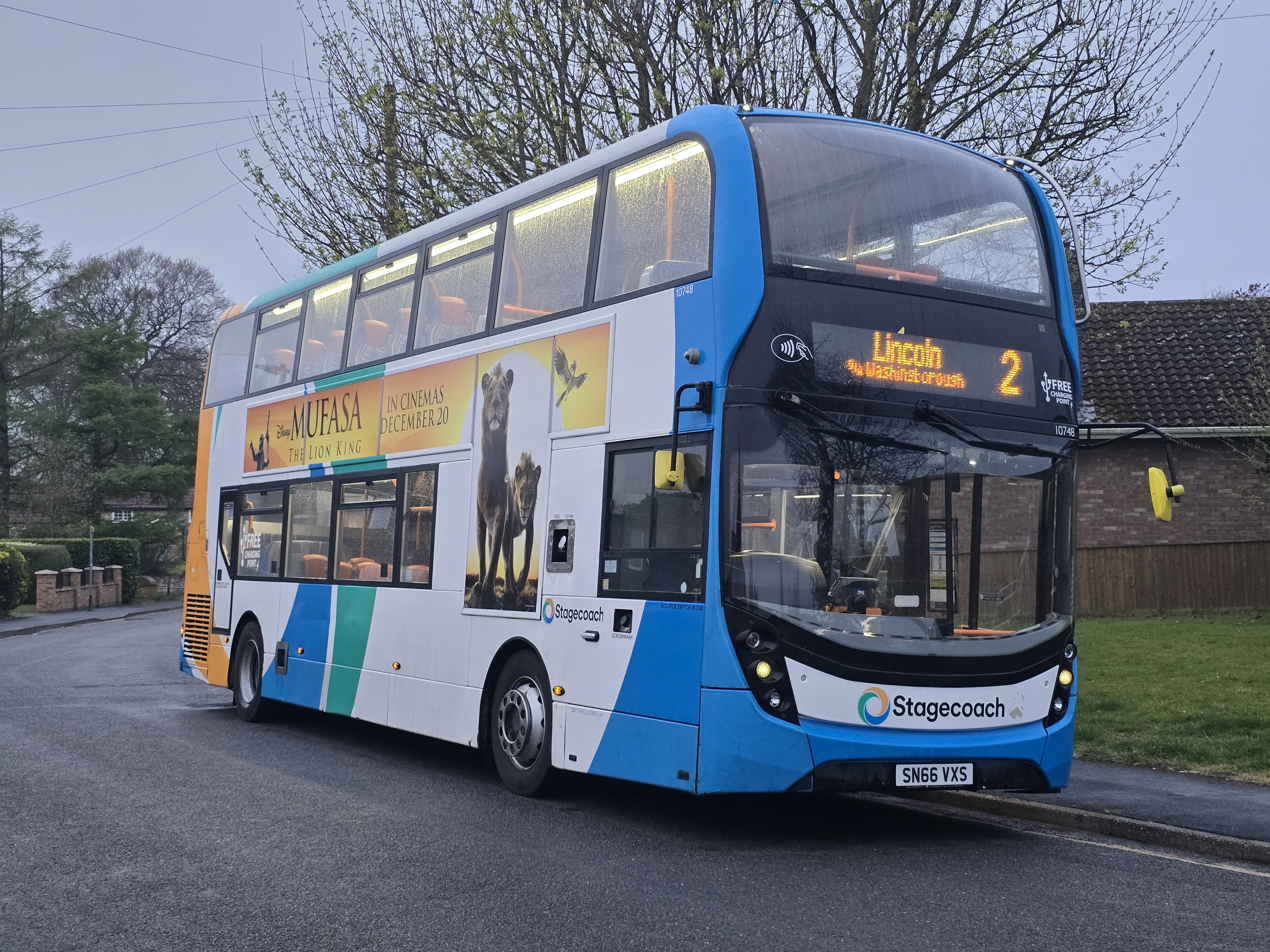
Stagecoach in Lincolnshire Alexander Dennis Enviro400 MMC in Branston in April 2025

Stagecoach acquired the Traction Group in 2005, and with it, Lincolnshire RoadCar, also a former NBC subsidiary. Stagecoach in Lincolnshire operates local services across Lincolnshire for towns such as Lincoln, Gainsborough, Scunthorpe and Skegness, as well as the InterConnect brand which provides links between these towns.

Stagecoach Grimsby-Cleethorpes, meanwhile, was acquired earlier, with municipal operator Grimsby-Cleethorpes Transport (GCT) being sold by the councils of Grimsby and Cleethorpes to Stagecoach Holdings in 1993, following a protracted bidding process that saw off the Traction Group, the EYMS Group and a management buyout offer. Following the acquisition of Lincolnshire RoadCar, Stagecoach Grimsby-Cleethorpes was amalgamated into the Stagecoach in Lincolnshire brand in 2006, which itself was integrated into an enlarging Stagecoach East Midlands operation with a new head office for the subsidiary in Lincoln. Grimsby-Cleethorpes mostly operates services in the towns of Grimsby and Cleethorpes, as well as outlying areas and an express service to Kingston upon Hull known as the 'TwoFifty'.

=== Hull ===
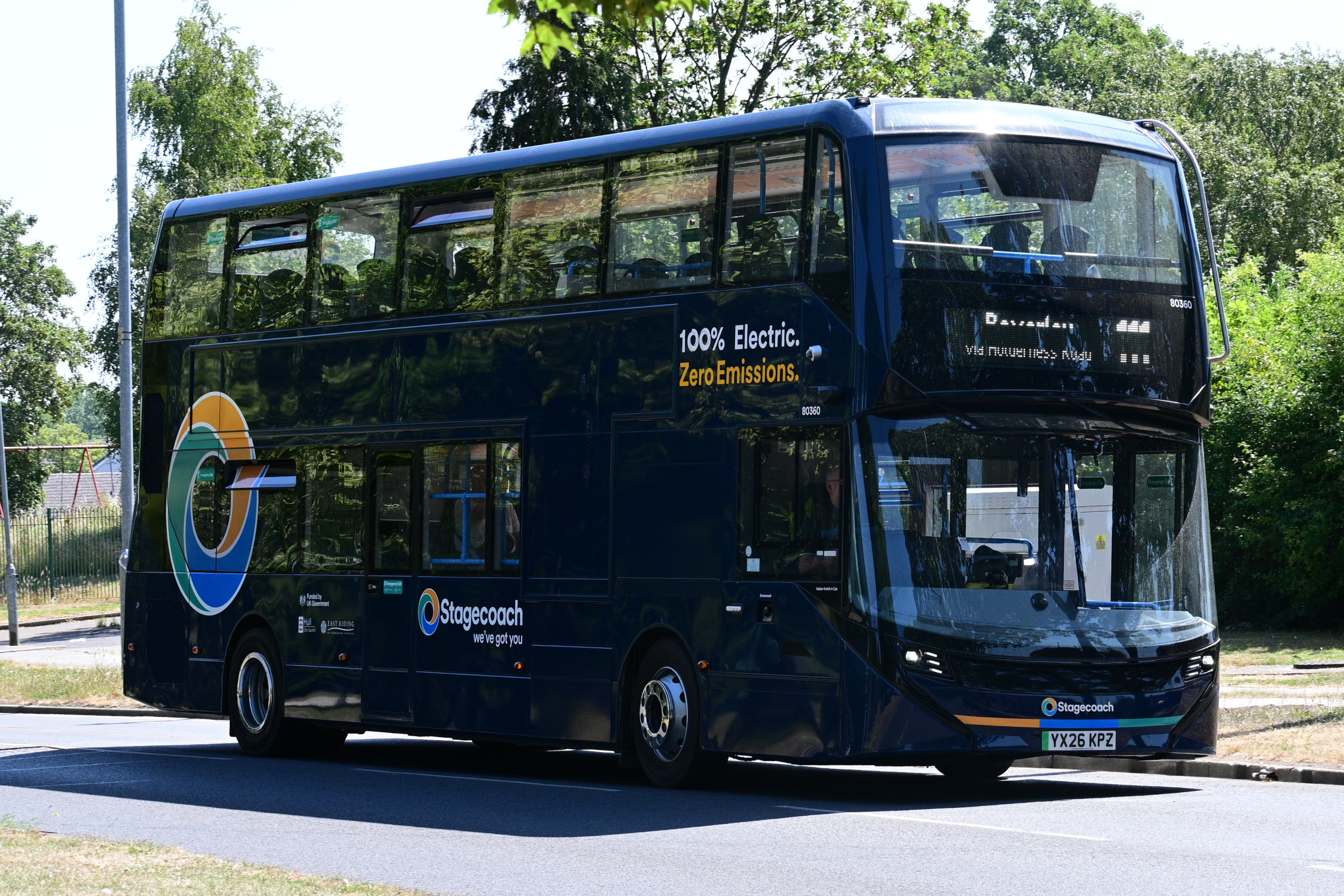
Stagecoach in Hull Alexander Dennis Enviro400EV battery electric bus in Sutton Ings, Kingston upon Hull in July 2026

Stagecoach in Hull was formed in September 1994 with the purchase of Cleveland Transit, who owned Kingston upon Hull City Transport (KHCT) at the time. They are Kingston upon Hull's main bus operator, alongside East Yorkshire, and operate a number of services around the city, as well as longer services for Beverley, Hedon and Bridlington. In 2019, Stagecoach was contracted by the East Riding of Yorkshire Council to run Bridlington's Park & Ride service following the expiry of East Yorkshire's tendering contract.
