= Lincolnshire InterConnect =

Rural bus network in Lincolnshire, England

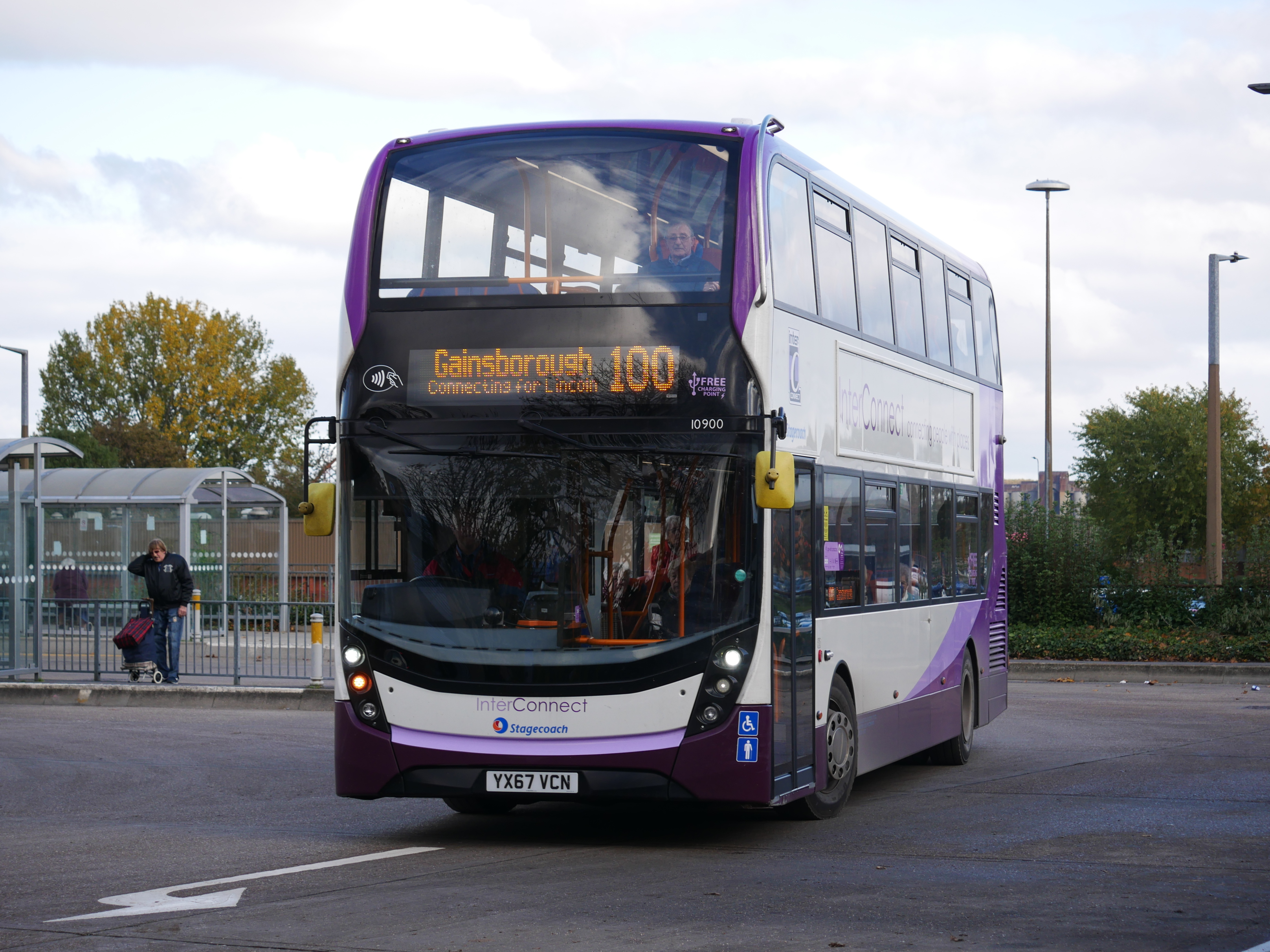
An InterConnect Alexander Dennis Enviro400 MMC operated by Stagecoach in Lincolnshire departing Scunthorpe bus station

Lincolnshire InterConnect is a rural bus network in the county of Lincolnshire in the east of England.

A number of InterConnect-branded interurban bus routes with fixed timetables are complemented by demand-responsive, flexible CallConnect minibuses, on which journeys must be booked in advance. Many of the InterConnect services are provided by Stagecoach in Lincolnshire; CallConnect services are run by a variety of operators including TransportConnect Ltd who are a wholly owned company of Lincolnshire County Council.

InterConnect was first established in 1999, when the existing Lincolnshire RoadCar "Connect 6" Lincoln–Skegness bus (introduced in 1998 as part of Route 6's rebrand) was rebranded and its service frequency increased. CallConnect was established in 2001. The network and its services are subsidised by Lincolnshire County Council and Norfolk County Council. Some services were scaled back between 2011 and 2012, following cuts to local government funding and reductions in the Bus Service Operators Grant fuel duty subsidy.

== List of InterConnect routes ==
=== Current routes ===
Route name	Map colour	Destinations	Route variants	Operator	Date introduced	Timetable link	Does it run on Sundays and Bank Holidays?
InterConnect 1	Orange	Lincoln–Grantham	—	Stagecoach in Lincolnshire	November 2002		Yes, every two hours between Lincoln and Grantham and hourly between Lincoln and Waddington.
InterConnect B5	Red	Lincoln–Woodhall Spa–Boston (Note: This service formerly continued to Spalding.)	B5X (Note: Serves Lincoln and Conigsby only, except for one schoolday service from Tattershall to Boston.)	Brylaine Travel	July 2002		No
InterConnect 37	Unlisted	Spalding–Peterborough	—	Stagecoach in Peterborough	May 2010		Yes, 5 times each way.
InterConnect 251	Spanish Blue	Hull–Barton–Grimsby–Holton le Clay–Louth	51B (Note: Serve colleges and schools in Grimsby and Louth.)	Stagecoach in Lincolnshire	April 2006		Yes, every two hours.
InterConnect 53 (Note: This service was originally numbered InterConnect 3 and the route formerly continued to Cleethorpes.)	Green	Lincoln–Market Rasen / Market Rasen–Grimsby (Note: This route is divided into two, in order "to comply with Department for Transport guidance". Connections are guaranteed at the route dividing point, and the journey often continues on the same vehicle.) (Note: From 2010–2011, the InterConnect 3 service was extended to Newark-on-Trent as the 'executive' service X3, in order to meet East Coast Main Line trains at Newark North Gate railway station. This extended service was cancelled in March 2011, with the operator citing a lack of passenger demand.)	53A (Note: Runs on school days only, serving De Aston School. The morning departure from Lincoln and afternoon departure from Grimsby also serve Linwood)	Stagecoach in Lincolnshire	February 2004		No
InterConnect 56	Yellow	Lincoln–Horncastle / Horncastle–Skegness	—	Stagecoach in Lincolnshire	February 1999		Yes, every two hours.
InterConnect 57/B7	Hot Pink	Skegness–Boston	X57 (Note: Continues from Skegness to Chapel St Leonards and back and also has Boston College as the start and end of route.)	Stagecoach in Lincolnshire / Brylaine Travel	March 2005		No
InterConnect 59 (Note: This route originally only ran between Skegness and Mablethorpe, but in 2009, the route was extended to Louth on Monday to Saturday.)	Purple	Skegness–Mablethorpe / Mablethorpe–Louth	—	Stagecoach in Lincolnshire	March 2005		Yes, every hour during the summer season only.
InterConnect 100	Light Blue	Lincoln–Gainsborough / Gainsborough–Scunthorpe	101 (Note: College days only. Early-morning departure from Scunthorpe to Gainsborough, connecting with the 100 to Lincoln. Morning departure from Gainsborough serving John Leggott and North Lindsey colleges. Afternoon departues from Scunthorpe colleges to Gainsborough.)	Stagecoach in Lincolnshire	April 2006		No
InterConnect 505	Blue-green	Spalding–King's Lynn	—	Stagecoach in Lincolnshire	February 2002		Yes, every hour.

The various models of double and single-decker buses used by Stagecoach in Lincolnshire for its InterConnect services are painted in a special purple livery with the strapline "Connecting people with places" and the logos of the network's council partners also applied. Before the network was rebranded in 2023, buses formerly had a version of the previous Stagecoach livery in purple-and-gold branding, with some buses featuring route-specific numbered branding, in particular the flagship InterConnect 6 service, and a "Coastal Connect" brand used on the routes serving towns and villages on the Lincolnshire coast. Buses from the other InterConnect operators tend to carry that operator's standard paint scheme.

== Former routes ==
Route name	Destinations	Operator	Date introduced	Date removed
InterConnect 5	Boston–Spalding	Brylaine Travel	July 2001	?
InterConnect 18 (Rail Link)	Lincoln–Sleaford–Spalding–Peterborough	East Midlands Trains	April 2011	?
InterConnect X3	Lincoln–Newark	Stagecoach in Lincolnshire	June 2010	April 2011
InterConnect 3 (Note: This route still runs as Interconnect 53, but with it only running between Lincoln and Grimsby.)	Lincoln–Cleethorpes	Stagecoach in Lincolnshire	February 2004	2016
InterConnect 6x (Note: Lincoln to Skegness "the quick way": first ran in the 2012 school summer holidays; added to the main timetable in March 2013. 20% faster than the basic number 6 service; does not serve Raithby, Spilsby, Partney or Burgh-le-Marsh.)	Lincoln–Skegness (the quick way)	Stagecoach in Lincolnshire	July 2012	2014 (Note: For unknown reasons, the 6x was withdrawn in 2014.)

== CallConnect services ==
There are two kinds of CallConnect services – entirely demand-responsive 'dial-a-ride' services which serve an area with no fixed route or timetable, and semi-flexible services which run to a timetable but which deviate off the route to serve smaller villages. Journeys on CallConnect must be booked in advance on a mobile app, or on the CallConnect website or over the telephone in areas not served by the app. Fares are calculated in six radial 'zones' based from the pick-up point of the journey.

In 2011, Lincolnshire County Council reported a 23.5% increase in usage of CallConnect compared to the previous year.

=== CallConnect areas ===
CallConnect services operate in 14 named areas across Lincolnshire, including the north side of the city of Lincoln and its nearby villages, and extending into neighbouring counties) – only the remainder of Lincoln and the surrounding area, as well as the unitary authority of North East Lincolnshire, are not covered by CallConnect. The areas covered are:

Route number	Area covered	Operator	Date introduced	Timetable link
7B	Boston	TransportConnect	April 2011	
15B	Bourne	Kier	July 2008	
53C	Brigg, Caistor and Ridge	PC Coaches	February 2016	
100G	Gainsborough	Kier	April 2006	
1G/1K	Grantham, Newark & Kesteven	TransportConnect	November 2002 (1G); July 2008 (1K)	
5C/6H	Horncastle, Coningsby & Woodhall Spa	Kier	April 2001 (6H); July 2002 (5C)	
505H/505L	Holbeach & Long Sutton	TransportConnect	February 2002	
51E/51N/51S	Louth	Kier / TC Minicoaches	March 2004 (51N); February 2005 (51S); July 2008 (51E)	
9M	Mablethorpe & Alford	Kier	March 2005	
3C/3M	Market Rasen & Caistor	TC Minicoaches	February 2004	
18M/18S	Metheringham & Sleaford	Kier	April 2008	
4P/4R/4S	Peterborough, Rutland, Stamford & the Welland Vales	TransportConnect	September 2009 (4S); April 2010 (4P); July 2010 (4R)	
9S	Skegness	Kier	April 2011	
16S	Spalding	Kier	March 2009	
6S/7W	Spilsby & Wainfleet	TC Minicoaches	April 2001 (6S); February 2005 (7W)	

=== Timetabled CallConnect services ===
Route number	Destinations	Operator	Date introduced	Timetable link
3L/3X	Louth–Binbrook–Market Rasen	TC Minicoaches	May 2011	
6C	Horncastle–Louth	Kier	April 2001	
51M	Louth–Manby	Kier	?	
65/65A	Sleaford–Woodhall Spa–Horncastle	Kier / Sleafordian Coaches	?	
635	Sleaford-Cranwell	Kier	April 2013	
H1	Horncastle town service	Kier	?	
