= Bradley, Lincolnshire =

Village and civil parish in North East Lincolnshire, England

Coordinates: 53.543450°N 0.125175°W

Bradley
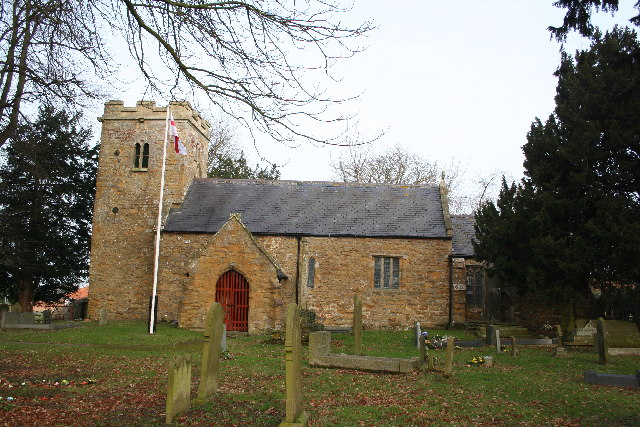
- Church of St George, Bradley

- Location within Lincolnshire
- Population: 235 (2021 census)
- OS grid reference: TA243068
  - London: 140 mi (230 km) S
- Unitary authority: North East Lincolnshire
- Ceremonial county: Lincolnshire
- Region: Yorkshire and the Humber
- Country: England
- Sovereign state: United Kingdom
- Post town: Grimsby
- Postcode district: DN37
- Police: Humberside
- Fire: Humberside
- Ambulance: East Midlands
- UK Parliament: Brigg and Immingham

Bradley is a village and civil parish in North East Lincolnshire, England. It is situated approximately 3 miles (5 km) south-west from Grimsby and 2 miles (3 km) north from Barnoldby le Beck. At the 2021 census, the civil parish had a population of 235 people in 82 households.

Bradley's grade II* listed Anglican parish church is dedicated to St. George. Originating in the 12th century, it is of partly Norman origin. Restoration of the chancel and installation of electric lighting took place in 1928. The parish register dates from 1664. In the early 1930s, there existed a small Methodist chapel. Poorer children in the parish were educated at a free school at Laceby, 2 miles (3 km) away. Parish occupations included four farmers, a poultry farmer, and a fruit grower.

To the south of the village, within the parish boundary, are Bradley Woods (allegedly haunted) and Dixon Woods which together form a local nature reserve. To the east, within the Grimsby boundary, lies the Bradley Recreation Ground and beyond that the Bradley Park Estate. The land on which these stand was part of Bradley parish until 1928.

== Demographics ==
Census population of Bradley parish
Census	Population	Female	Male	Households	Source
2001	195	102	93	60	
2011	198	117	81	65	
2021	235	120	115	82	
