= Freshney Place =

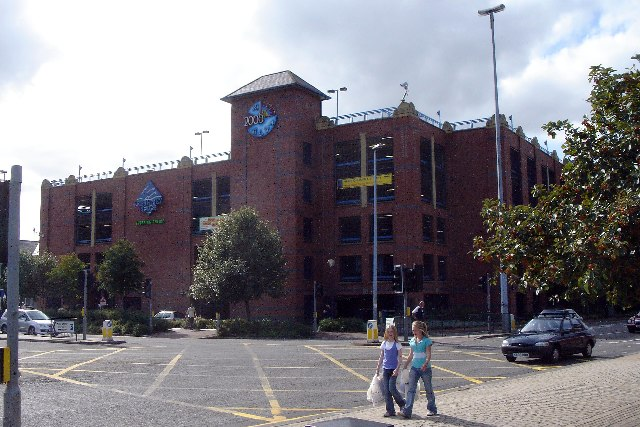
- Eastern parking Freshney Place
- Location: Grimsby
- Coordinates: 53.5662°N 0.0865°W
- Opened: 1968 as Riverhead Centre
- Owner: North East Lincolnshire Council
- Num. of stores: 100
- Floor area: 46,450 m2
- Floors: 1
- Website: www.freshneyplace.co.uk
- Expanded and renamed Freshney Place in 1989

Freshney Place is a shopping centre in Grimsby, North East Lincolnshire. Located in the centre of Grimsby, it is visited annually by over 6 million shoppers and employs over 2,000 retail workers. The centre houses over 70 stores, with the anchor stores of Marks and Spencer, Next, Primark and Deichmann.

== Development ==
Constructed between 1967 and 1971 in a joint venture between the old Grimsby Borough Council and developers Hammerson's UK Ltd., it was known as the Riverhead Centre (so named as the development was adjacent to where the two local rivers, the Freshney and the Haven, meet). It is situated to the north of Victoria Street, the main pedestrianised shopping street of the town.

The Riverhead Centre development caused some controversy as it replaced old architecture with new, as was typical in the 1960s. It demolished much of the old town centre, including the historic Bull Ring (which is now where Wilkos, the Halifax Bank and the St James Hotel are based), and streets going back many centuries, including Flottergate (located at the present-day entrance to Freshney Place between the former Poundland and the market), Brewery Street (located at the present-day entrance to Freshney Place between Barclays and TSB Bank), and East St Mary's Gate (no trace remains). During this reconstruction, the ornate Victorian branch of the Midland Bank was demolished; a building of contemporary design was incorporated into the new shopping centre. In 1983 Marks and Spencer purchased the local department store Lawson and Stockdale, whose frontage ran along Victoria Street; they demolished the building and constructed a new store, linked to the centre.

In 1990 the council agreed to sell the surface parking area around the shopping centre to Hammerson's UK Ltd. The development owner and Humberside County Council, the highway authority, agreed to the sale of the area of Baxtergate, the road which ran to the rear of the shopping centre, between the shopping centre and the surface car park. Baxtergate was relocated alongside the River Freshney and became phase one of the Peaks Parkway.

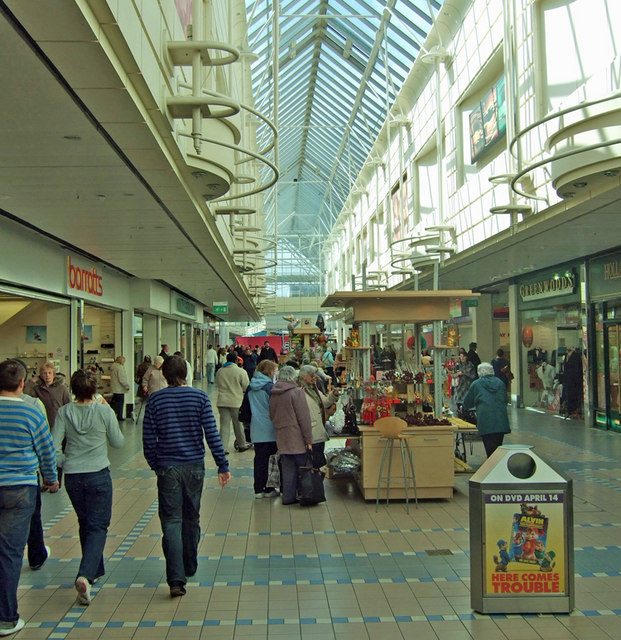
Freshney Place 2008

Hammerson's UK Ltd began a £100 million redevelopment of the retail centre, doubling it in size. The expanded centre was covered in a glass roof. Two multi-storey car parks were constructed at each end of the centre; with this development, the old Top Town area of Grimsby was effectively privatised and roofed over. Stores are serviced at the first floor by ramps at the western end, which can accommodate even large vehicles. The ramp also provides access to the car park on the roof of the indoor market, which is operated by the local council. In 1992 the site of the former Austin Friary (c1293-1539) was discovered in the course of this redevelopment, human remains from its cemetery were ultimately reinterred in Scartho Road Cemetery.

Freshney Place won a design commendation in the Refurbishment Category of the 1993 BCSC awards.
