= Scartho Road Cemetery, Grimsby =

Cemetery in Grimsby, England

Coordinates: 53.546°N 0.083°W

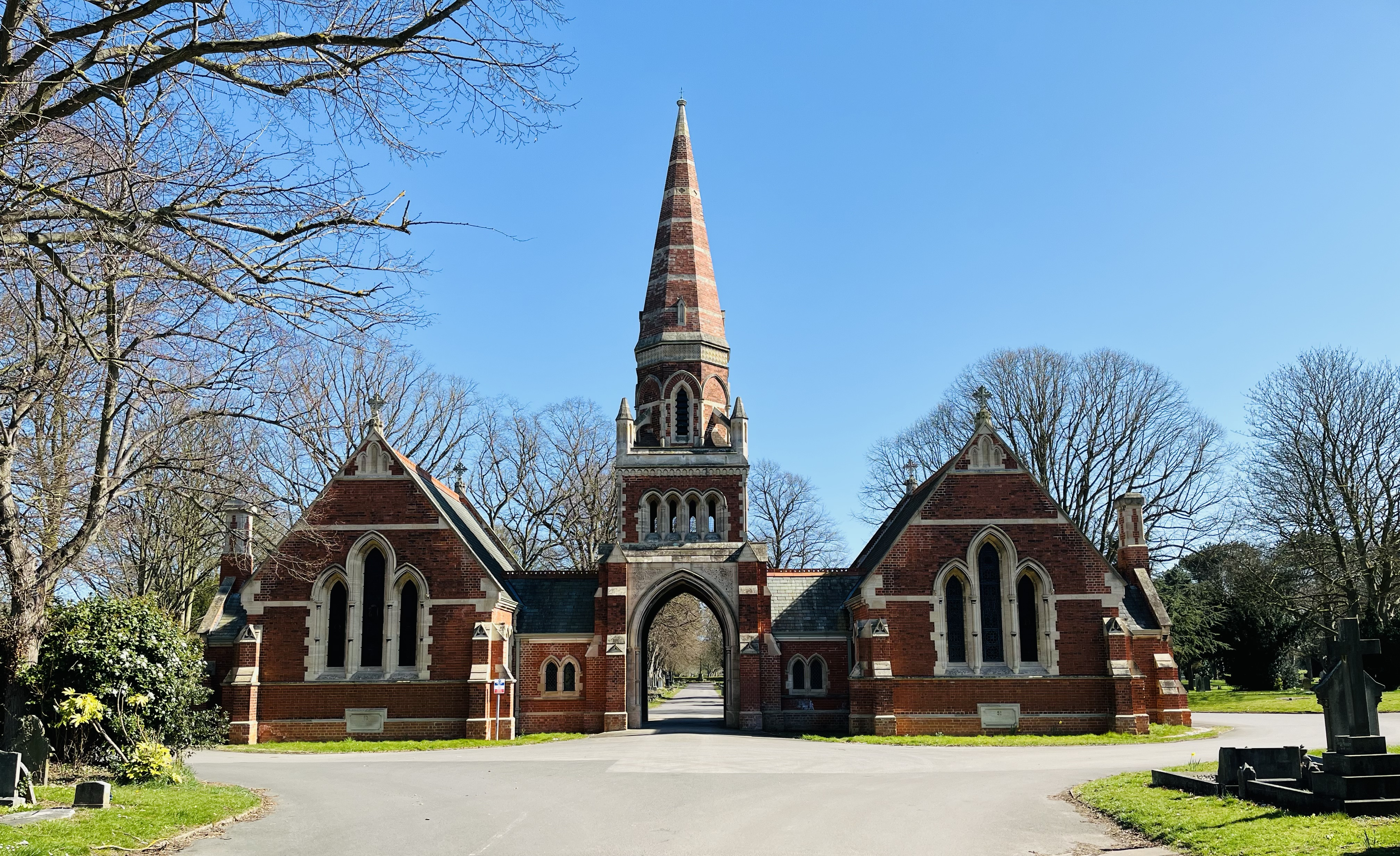
The chapels at Scartho Road Cemetery in Grimsby

Scartho Road Cemetery is the principal burial ground for the town of Grimsby in Lincolnshire. Opened for burials in 1889 and located on Scartho Road in the town, the cemetery is managed by North East Lincolnshire Council.

== History ==
Originally known as Grimsby Municipal Cemetery, the first burial in the cemetery was that of William Calvert, a retired pork butcher of Grimsby, who died of dropsy and was buried in Scartho Road Cemetery on the 31st October 1889.

== Cemetery buildings ==
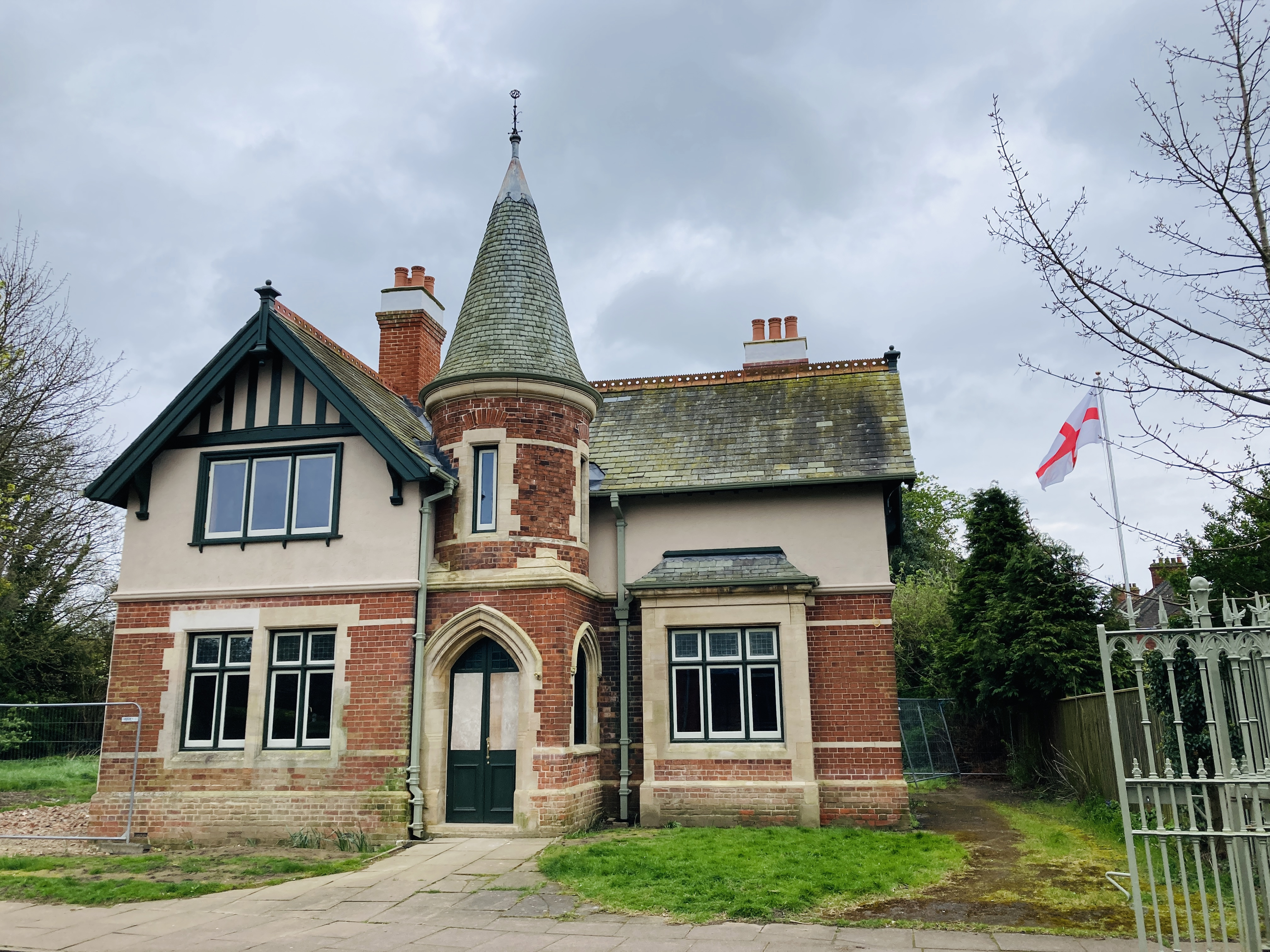
The former Gatekeeper's Lodge

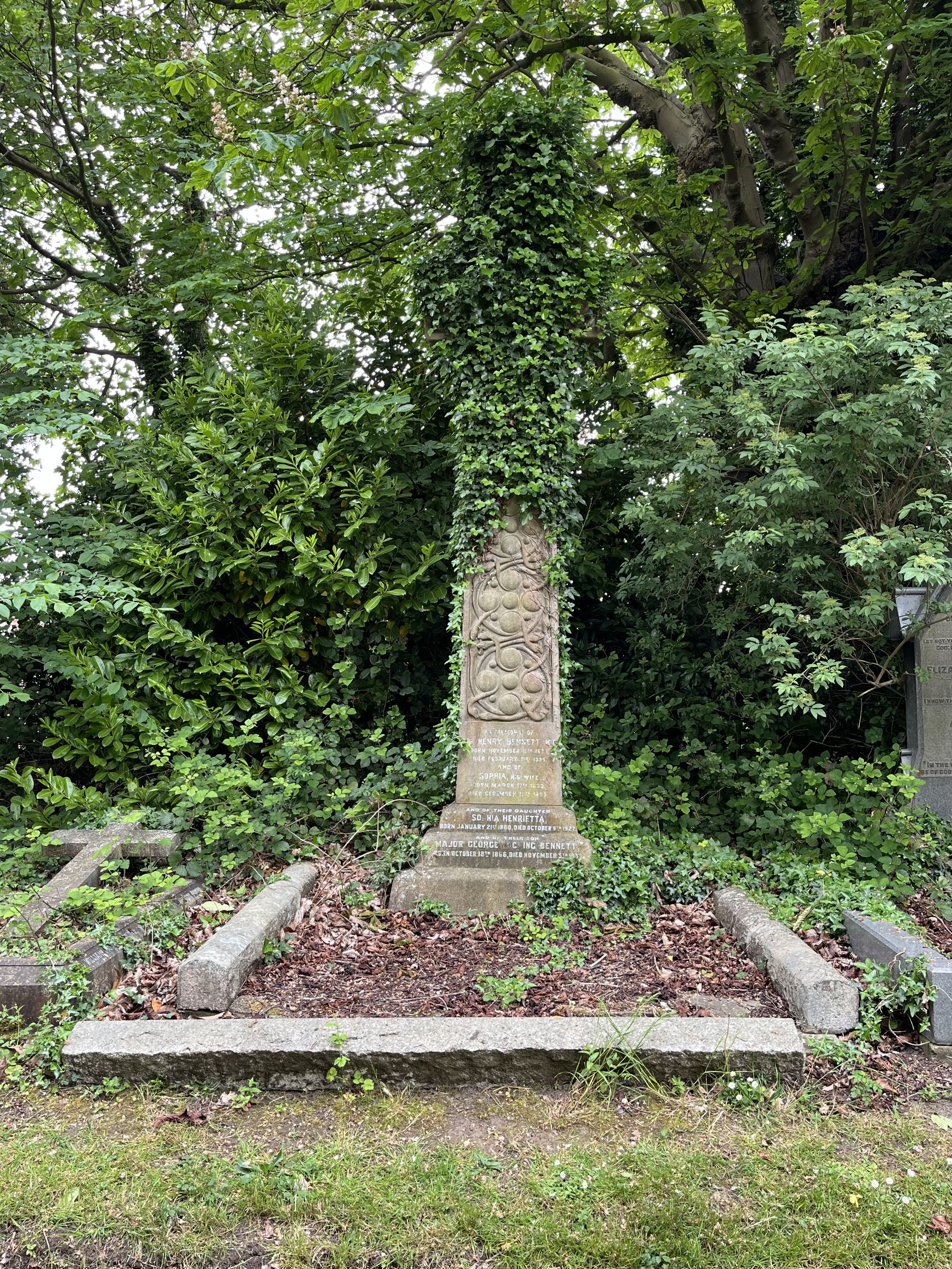
The Grade II listed memorial to Sir Henry Bennett (1827-1895)

Construction of the various cemetery structures began in late 1888 and are all Grade II listed buildings. The Scartho Chapel buildings form a group with the Gatekeeper's Lodge, the former Cemetery Waiting Rooms and toilet block and the inner gateway. The Chapels are in the Gothic revival style and were designed by architect Ernest William Farebrother for the Grimsby Corporation Cemetery Committee. All the cemetery buildings were constructed by local firm J. Thompson Builders of Grimsby and were erected in red brick in an English bond with limestone dressings. The roofs to all the buildings are in distinctive Westmoreland green slate. The listed cemetery gates were restored in 2019.

The Grade II listed former Cemetery Lodge is now a private residence. The memorial to Sir Henry Bennett (1827-1895) is a Grade II listed structure.

The Cemetery entrance was used in the 1985 film Clockwise.

== Burials from the World Wars ==
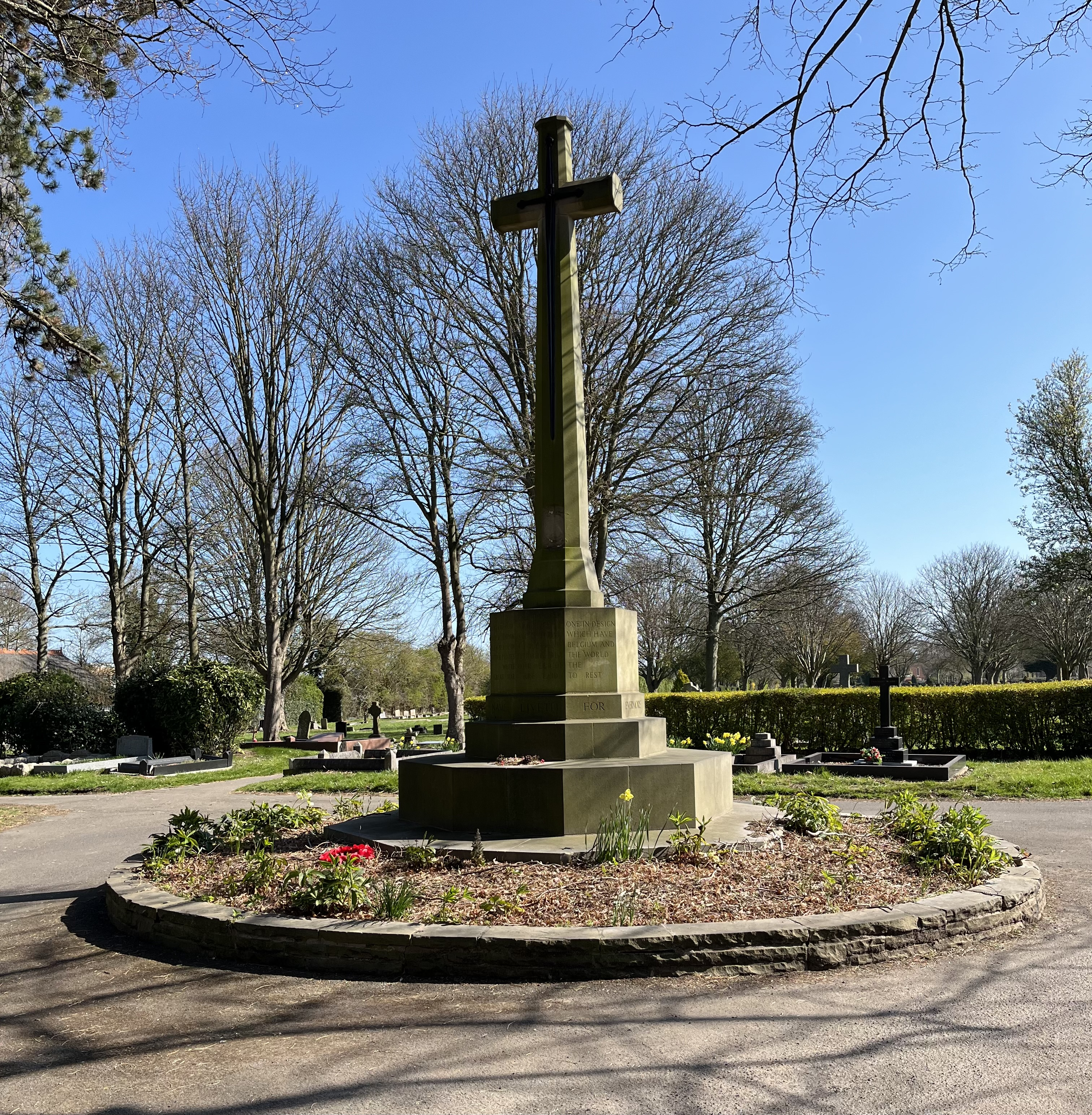
The cemetery's Cross of Sacrifice

The cemetery holds 291 Commonwealth War Graves Commission (CWGC) burials from the First World War with the relevant Cross of Sacrifice. These graves are mainly of seamen who died while serving with the Auxiliary Patrol which operated out of Grimsby. In addition, there are a further 261 CWGC graves from World War II, about 200 of which form a war graves plot behind a memorial stone dedicated to their memory. A large number of these are of personnel from the Royal Navy and the Merchant Navy and pilots and other servicemen and women of the Royal Air Force. With these are a further 17 war burials of various other nationalities including German prisoners of war from the camp at nearby Weelsby.

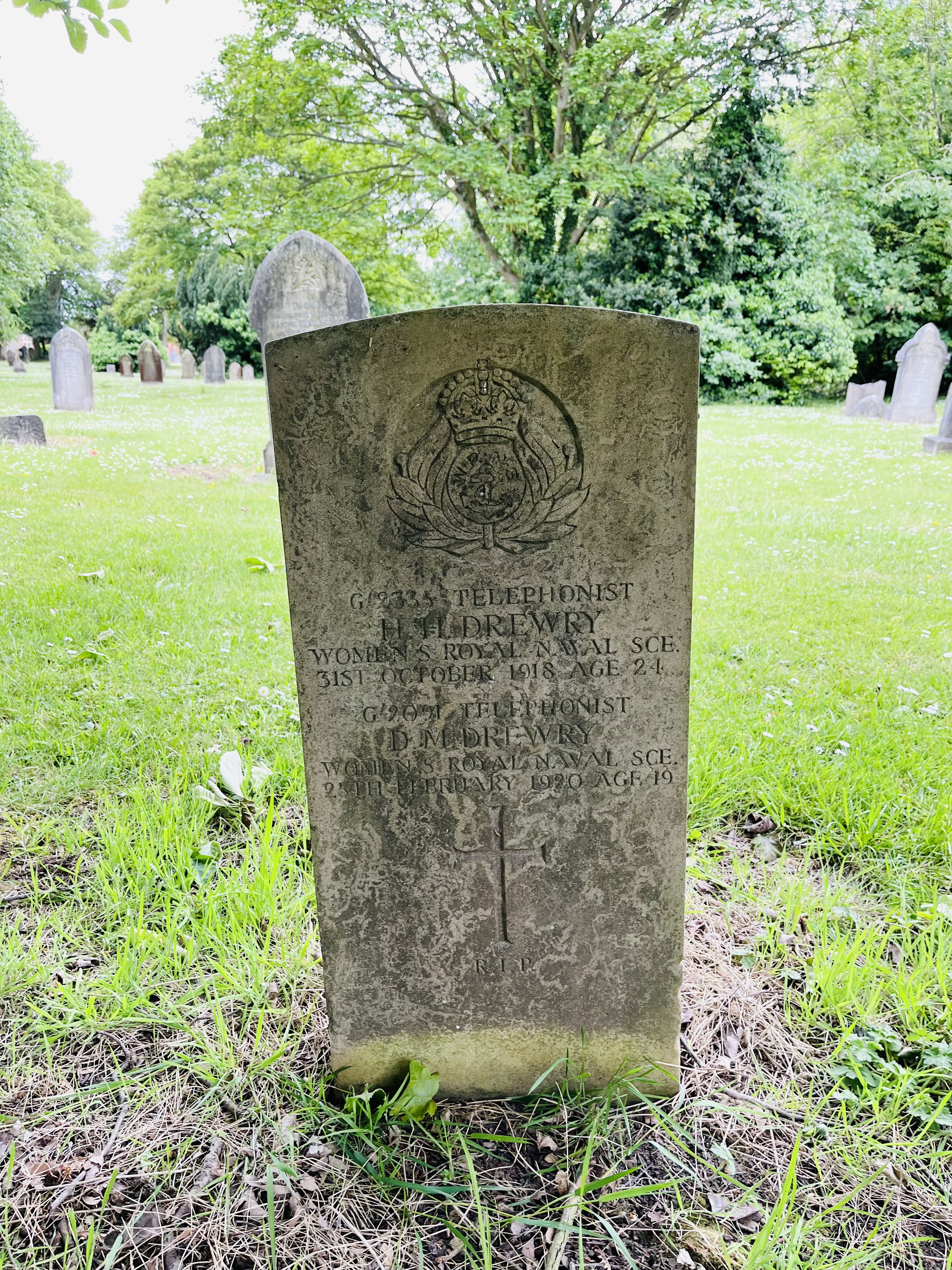
The grave of the Drewry sisters in Scartho Road Cemetery

Buried together in a grave with its distinctive Commonwealth War Graves Commission (CWGC) headstone are two sisters, casualties of World War I. These are Harriet Hawkesworth Drewry (1894-1918), a Telephonist serving with the Women's Royal Naval Service and her younger sister Dorothy Marjorie Drewry (1901-1920), of the same rank and service as her sister. Both are commemorated with a plaque beneath a Stations of the Cross designed by Sir Charles Arcbibald Nicholson and located in the church of St Augustine of Hippo in Grimsby.

== Notable burials ==
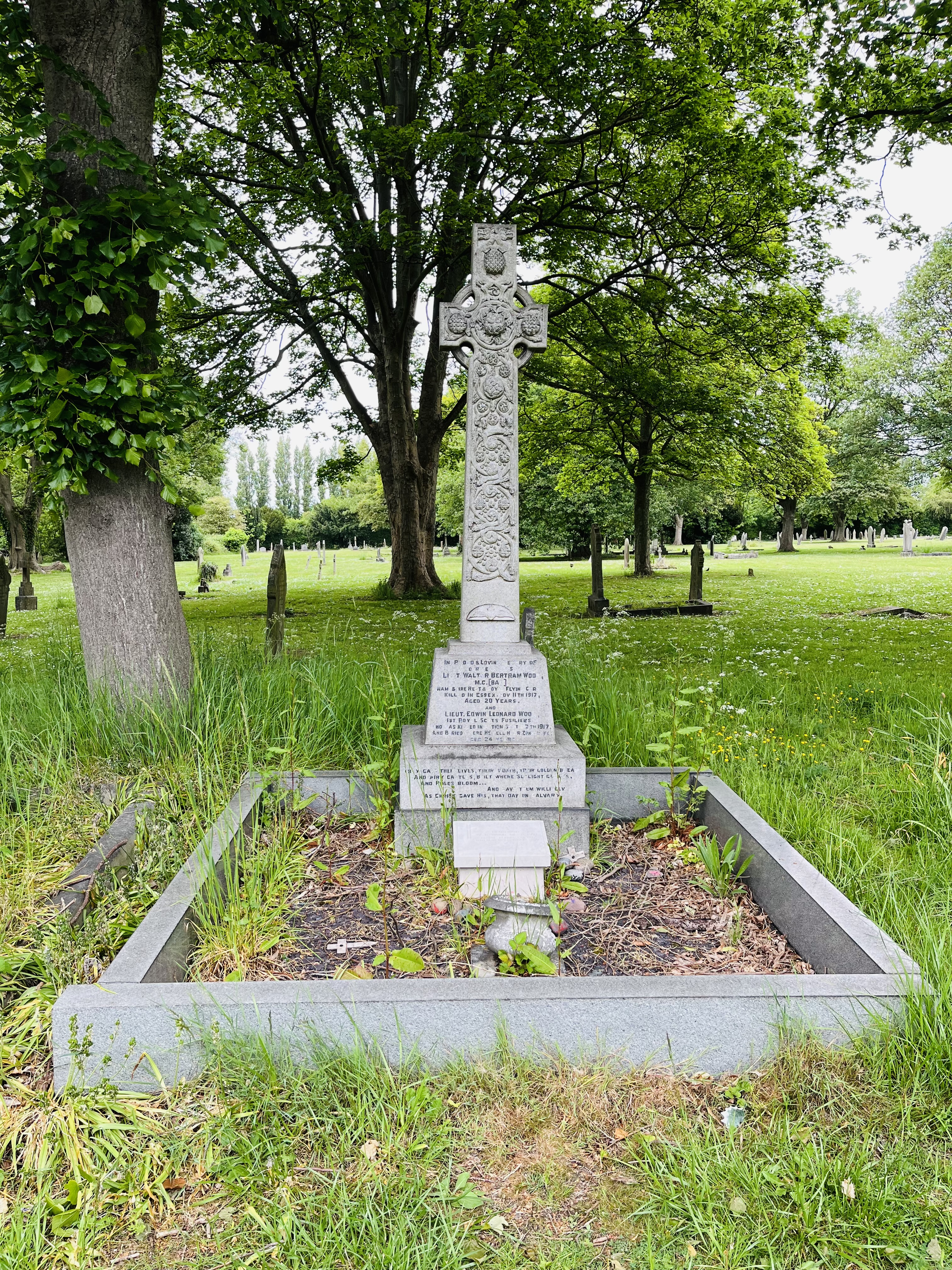
Grave of Walter Bertram Wood MC and Bar in Scartho Road Cemetery in Grimsby

- John Vincent, seaman and member of Ernest Shackleton's Imperial Trans-Antarctic Expedition (1914–1917) on board Endurance.
- Lieutenant Walter Bertram Wood MC*, British World War I flying ace credited with thirteen confirmed aerial victories.
- Reinterred in the cemetery are the human remains from the site of the former Austin Friary (c1293-1539) discovered in 1992 when the site was being developed for the Freshney Place shopping centre. Today a memorial stone marks the plot.
- Interred in a separate plot are three servicemen who died or were killed on active service in recent years. These include Sgt Matthew Telford (1972-2009) of the Grenadier Guards who was killed in Afghanistan, and after whom the nearby Telford Park was named. Also buried here is Able Seaman Charles George Warrender (1993-2013), found dead in the Seychelles and believed by his family to have been murdered.

== See also ==
- Grimsby Crematorium
