= Norma Procter =

English singer (1928–2017)

Norma Procter (15 February 1928, Cleethorpes, Lincolnshire – 2 May 2017, Grimsby) was an English contralto who studied with Roy Henderson.

She was especially known for her oratorio and recital work, but also performed in opera, with her debut at the Royal Opera House, Covent Garden, in 1961 as Gluck's Orpheus. She also sang Lucretia in The Rape of Lucretia for Britten at the 1958 Aldeburgh Festival. She is particularly known for her recordings of Mahler.

On her death she was cremated at Grimsby Crematorium.
