= Brenda Fisher =

English swimmer (1927–2022)

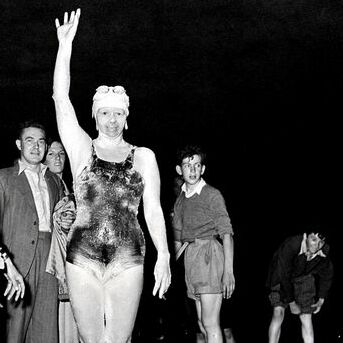
- in 1951

Personal information
- Born: 9 June 1927 Scartho, Lincolnshire, England
- Died: 2 August 2022 (aged 95) Scartho, Lincolnshire, England

Sport
- Sport: Swimming

Brenda Fisher BEM (9 June 1927 – 2 August 2022) was an English long-distance swimmer. In 1951 she broke the women's world record for swimming the English Channel, becoming a celebrity, and was given the British Sportswoman of the Year Award.

== Biography ==
Fisher was born and raised in Scartho, North East Lincolnshire, the daughter of a Grimsby trawler skipper, learned to swim at the age of 9, and initially became a speed swimmer.

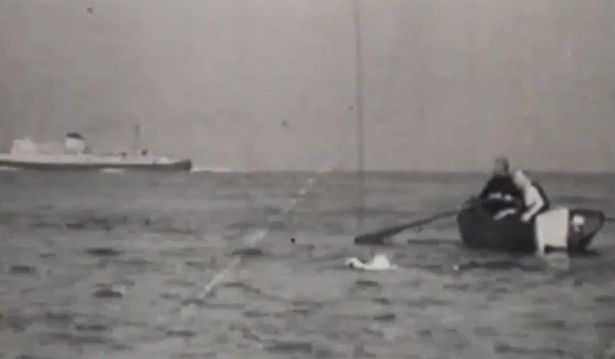
Brenda Fisher in 1951 swimming the English Channel

On 17 August 1951 she was the 23rd swimmer of the English Channel from France to England, completing it in a new record women's time of 12 hours 42 minutes. She was fed every hour, keeping up a rate of 25 strokes a minute, rising to 30 as she approached England. She only learned of her time when she landed in England. She broke the previous women's record of 13:20 set by Florence Chadwick a year earlier. A crowd of 60,000 turned out to welcome her back to Grimsby.

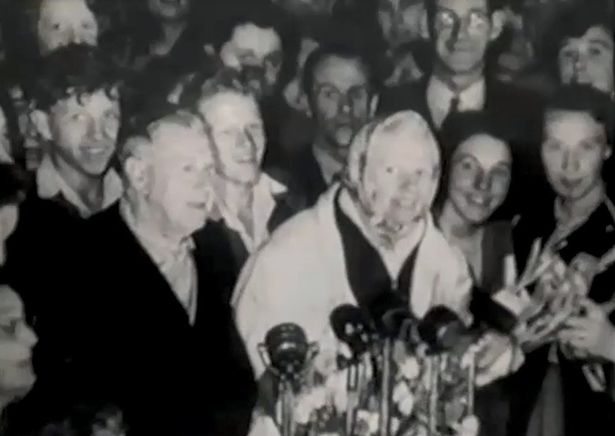
Brenda Fisher celebrity in 1951

Fisher swam the Channel again in 1954, and was the first woman ashore. In 1956, Fisher completed and won the 29-mile (47 km) River Nile Swim, then at the fastest time. Fisher was asked to attend the Royal Command Performance and she was given the Sportswoman of the Year Award.

In September 1956, Fisher took part in the 32-mile (51 km) Lake Ontario swim from Niagara to Toronto, completing it in 18 hours and 50 minutes, 2 hours and 6 minutes faster than the previous record set by Marilyn Bell. At that point, she was the third person in history to complete the swim. She attempted the Ontario swim again in 1957 but retired after 12 hours 43 minutes, during a thunder storm which threatened to sink her support boats.

Fisher, with Stanley Baker, was one of the judges in the 1954 Prestatyn "Easy To Love" Bathing Beauty Contest.

She married Paddy Johnson, footballer with Grimsby Town F.C. After retiring, she became a swimming teacher in Grimsby.

In 2015, her biography was published. Blonde In Deep Water was written by local journalist Lucy Wood.

In 2016, she appeared on the BBC Television series Flog It!, to sell her Clarice Cliff 'Inspiration' vase at auction and in June 2018 she appeared on Antiques Roadshow with her collection of swimming memorabilia.

Fisher received in 2018 the British Empire Medal, as part of the Queen's New Year Honours list, for her achievements in the sport of swimming. A blue plaque in her honour was erected in Grimsby in 2017.

Fisher died from complications of a stroke in Scartho, on 2 August 2022, at the age of 95. She was cremated at Grimsby Crematorium.
