= Grimsby Crematorium =

Crematorium in Grimsby, Lincolnshire, England

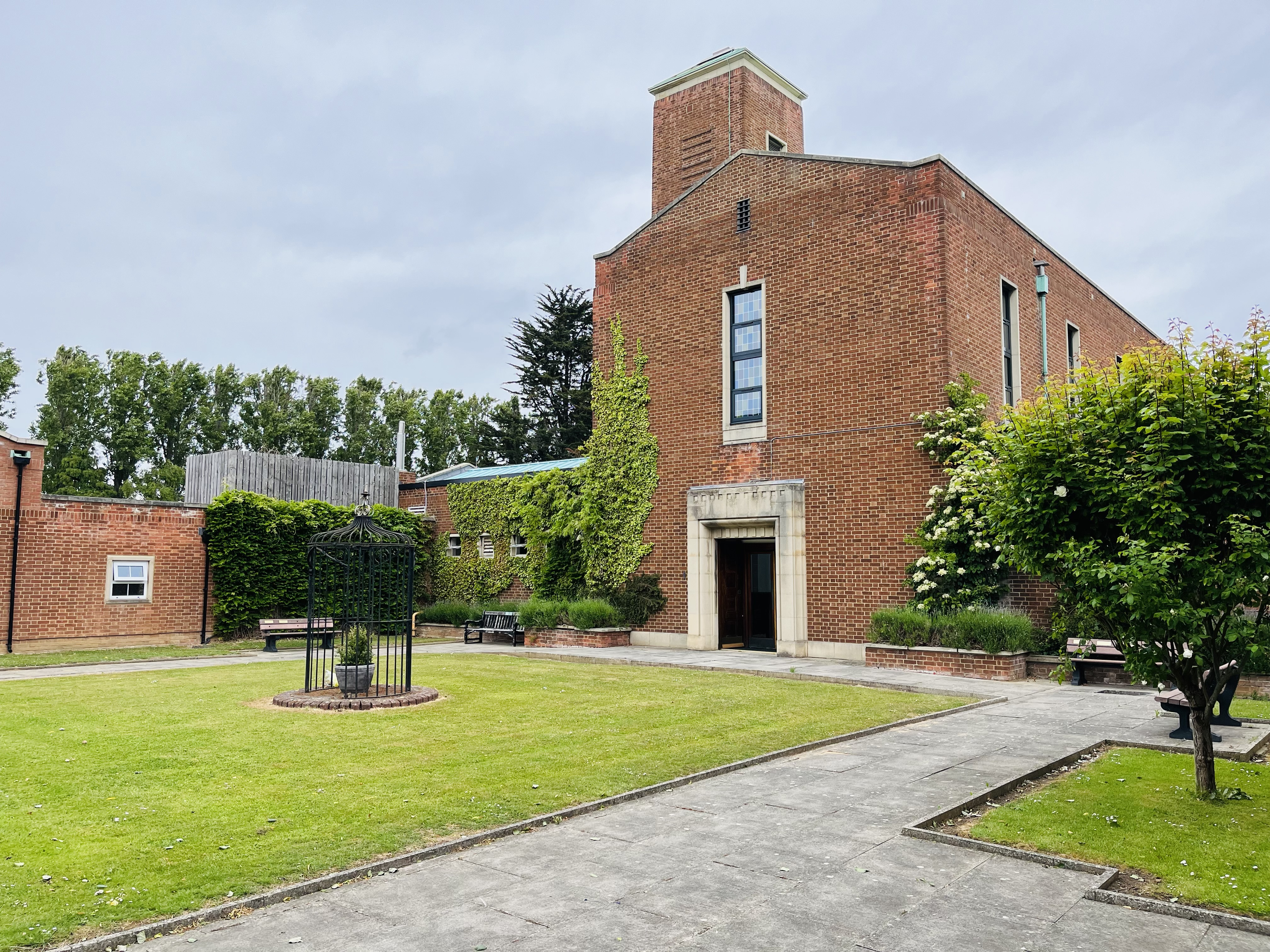
Grimsby Crematorium in 2025

Grimsby Crematorium is the crematorium for the town of Grimsby in Lincolnshire. Located on Weelsby Avenue, it can also be reached by passing through Scartho Road Cemetery to which it is attached. More than 2,000 cremations and burial services take place in the crematorium's chapels every year with about 200,000 mourners attending.

Grimsby Crematorium opened in 1954, and went through an extensive renovation in 2025, which included the opening of a new tea-room, 'Reflections', in the former Crematorium Lodge. Further improvements include extensions to the original building to provide function rooms and the launch of the Treasured Memories pet crematorium.

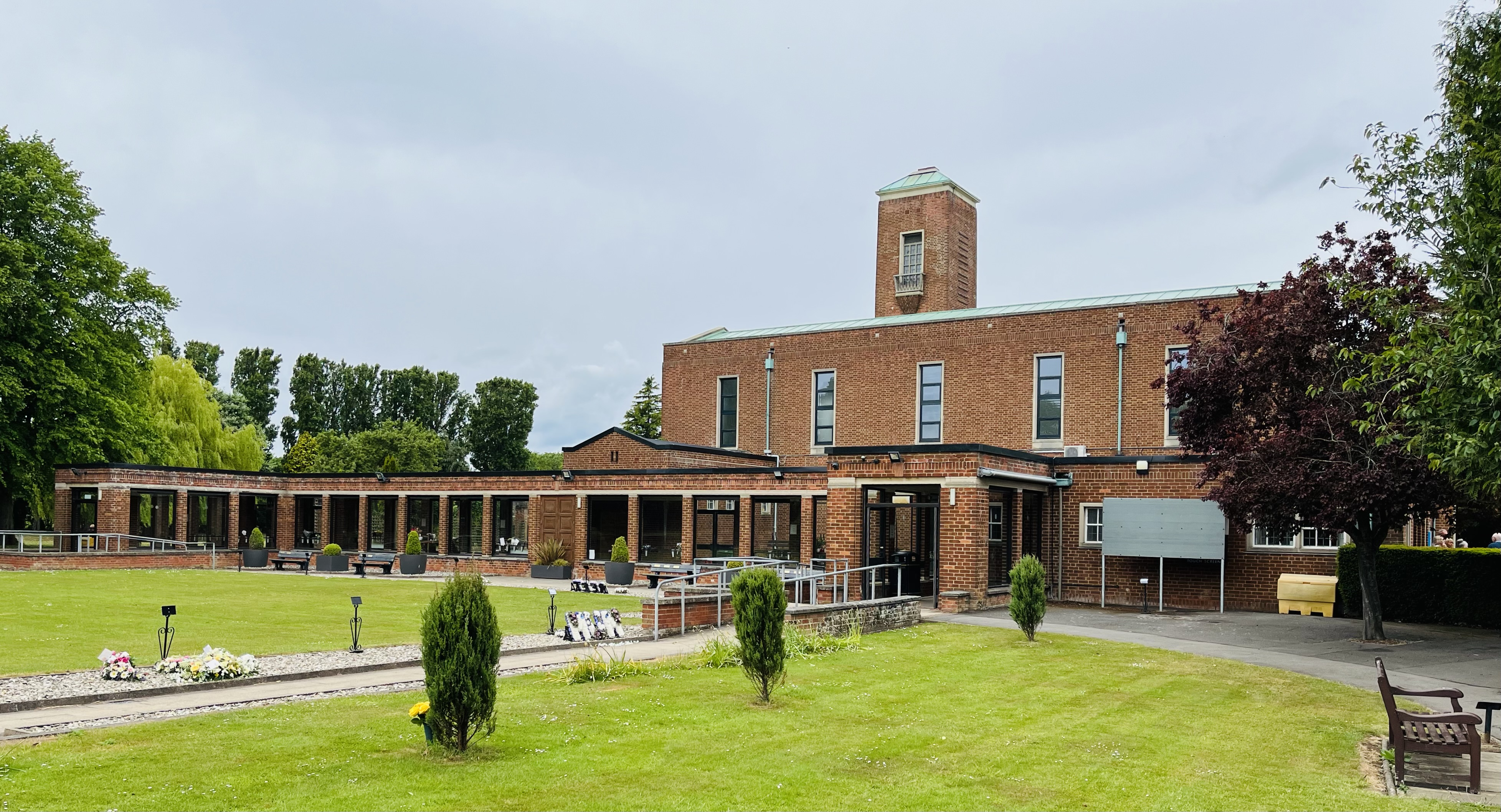
Grimsby Crematorium showing the grounds

The main chapel has capacity for about 145 seated mourners with additional standing space for larger gatherings while the balcony provides seating for about 23 more. The chapel is non-denominational and is for those of any faith or none. Web casts are available for transmission to mourners unable to attend services. There are two chapels in addition to memorial facilities including vaults, plaques on benches, a memorial wall and gardens of remembrance. Ashes can be scattered in the crematorium's extensive grounds. There is a physical Book of Remembrance which can also be viewed online.

== Notable cremations ==
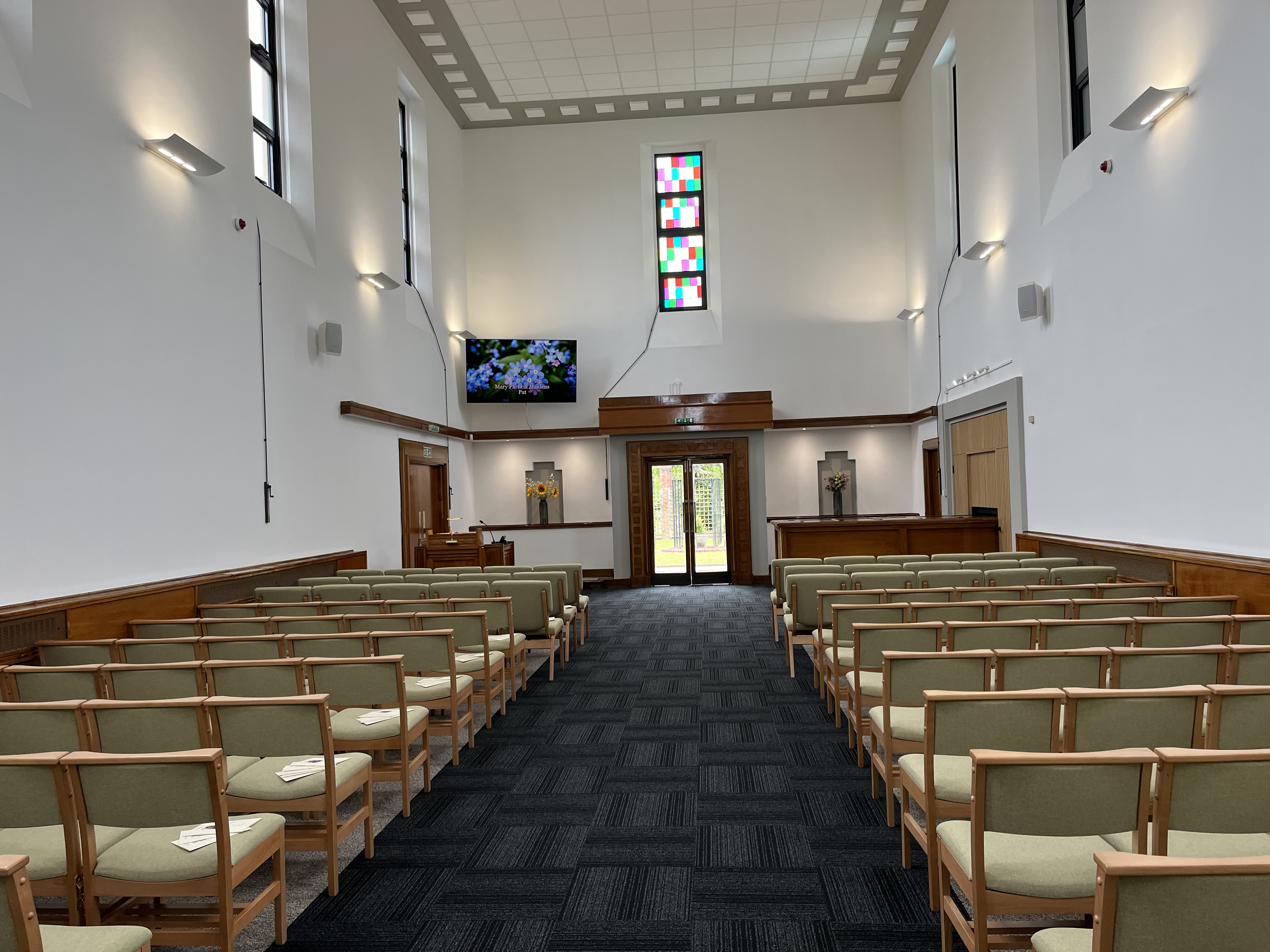
Inside the main chapel (2025)

- Footballer Jimmy Fell, made 317 League appearances, mostly for Grimsby Town.
- Channel swimmer Brenda Fisher.
- Operatic contralto Norma Procter.
- Folk-singer Allan Smethurst, 'The Singing Postman'.

== See also ==
- Scartho Road Cemetery, Grimsby
