= Ernest William Farebrother =

English architect

- Died: 1891 ?Grimsby
- Education: Pupil of Fowler of Louth
- Occupation: Architect
- Buildings: Prince of Wales Theatre, Grimsby.

Ernest William Farebrother (died 1891) was an architect who worked in Louth and Grimsby, Lincolnshire.

== Career ==
Farebrother was articled to James Fower of Louth for four years from September 1870 and after serving his articles remained as a clerk with Fowler until April 1876. At this point he left Fowler’s office, apparently because he had been carrying on work on his own behalf, but he was proposed ARIBA by Fowler in November 1877. He proceeded to FRIBA in Jan 1885, again proposed by Fowler and also by William Watkins of Lincoln. He set up an independent practice in Louth in 1876 and moved to Grimsby in 1879. His office was at Victoria Chambers, 89 Victoria Street and he lived at Corby House, Wellowgate, which he designed. His daughter Violet Farebrother was a noted actress who starred in three Hitchcock films.

== Architectural work ==
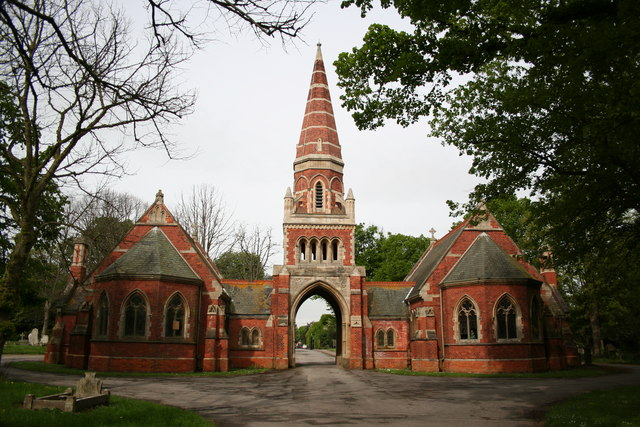
Cemetery Chapels, Scartho Road Cemetery, Grimsby (1888)

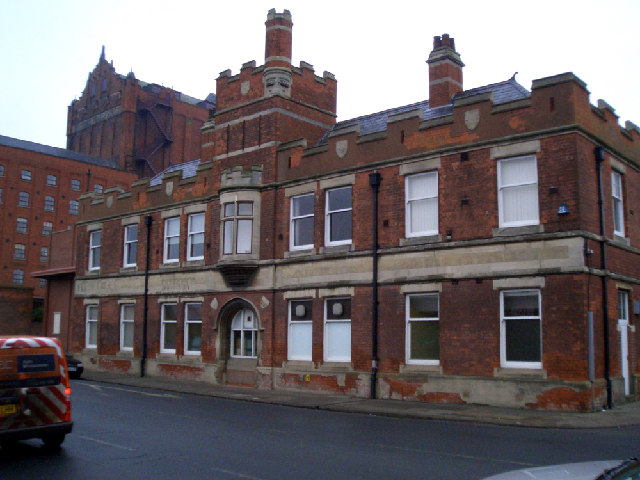
Victoria Street North drill hall, Grimsby 1891

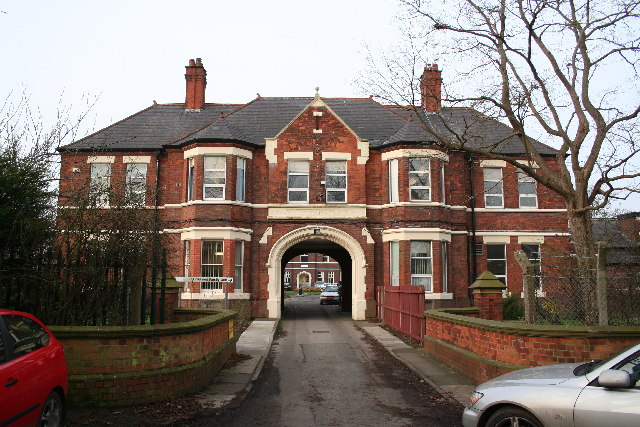
Grimsby Old Hospital by Ernest Farebrother and Herbert Scaping

Farebrother was the architect for several notable buildings in Grimsby and North Lincolnshire. These included:

- Prince of Wales Theatre, Grimsby. Re-built in 1886 at the cost of £5,000, giving seats for 2,630 persons.
- Corby House, Wellowgate. Farebrother designed this house for himself.
- Victoria Street North drill hall, Grimsby. (1891)
- Cemetery Chapels, Scartho Road, Grimsby. (1888)
- Scartho, Grimsby Workhouse which became Grimsby Old Hospital. (1892) Farebrother was the original architect, but after his death the work was continued by Herbert Scaping

== Literature ==
- Antram N (revised), Pevsner N & Harris J, (1989), The Buildings of England: Lincolnshire, Yale University Press.
- Antonia Brodie (ed), Directory of British Architects, 1834–1914: 2 Vols, British Architectural Library, Royal Institute of British Architects, 2001
- Lingard E (2017) Grimsby Streets, Pen and Sword, Barnsley, 2017. ISBN 9781473876019.
- Obituary: Builder, Vol.60, 9 May 1891, pg. 378.
