= 1st Lincolnshire Artillery Volunteers =

1st Lincolnshire Artillery Volunteers 1st North Midland Brigade, RFA 60th (North Midland) Field Regiment, RA
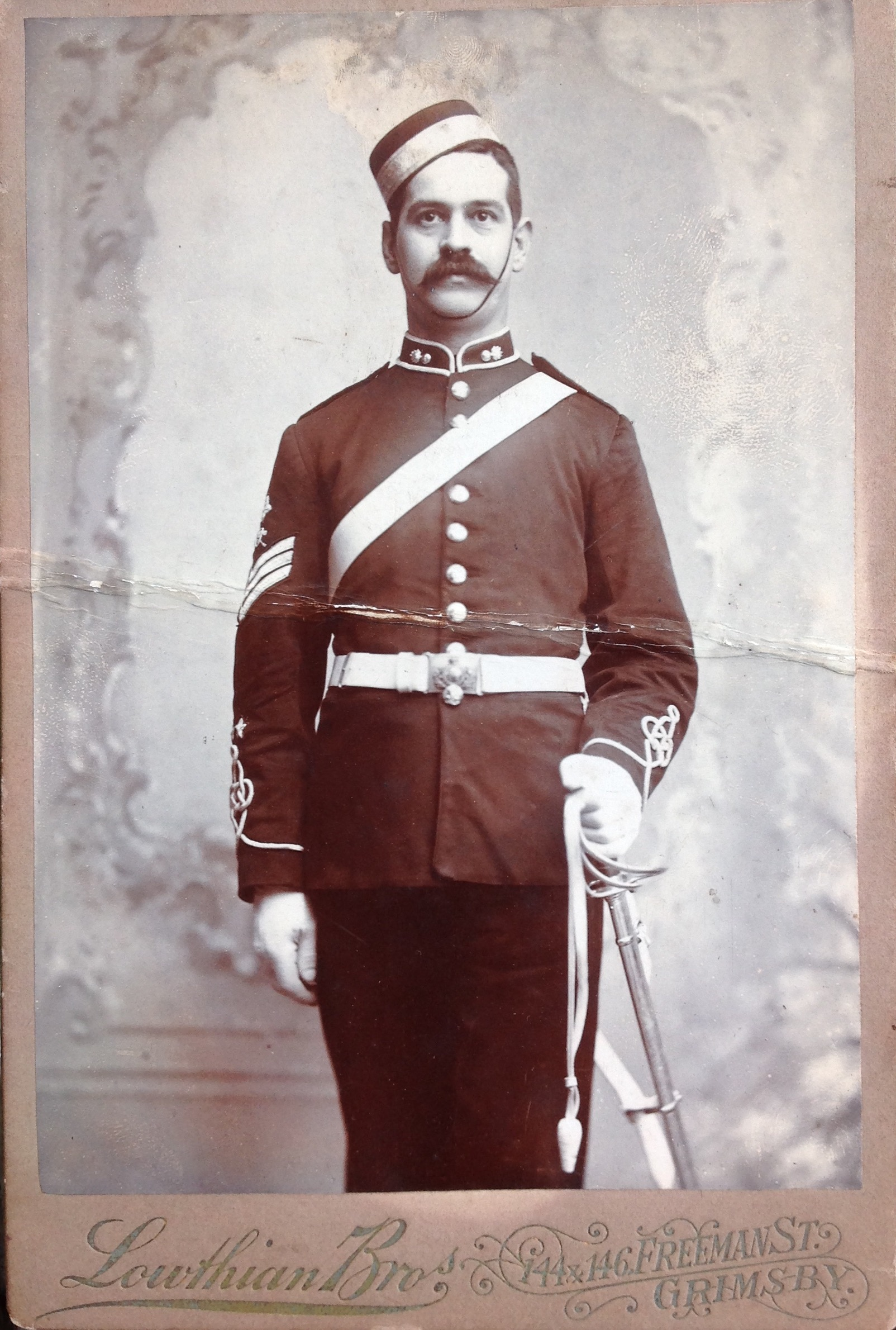
- Non Commissioned Officer of the 1st Lincolnshire Volunteer Artillery, c. 1895
- Active: 1860–1947
- Country: United Kingdom
- Branch: Territorial Army
- Type: Artillery Regiment
- Role: Garrison Artillery; Position Artillery; Field Artillery; Long Range Penetration Infantry
- Garrison/HQ: Grimsby (1860–1919); Nottingham (1921–1938); Lincoln (from 1938)
- Engagements: World War I: Hohenzollern Redoubt; Gommecourt; Menin Road Ridge; Polygon Wood; Bourlon Wood; German spring offensive; Hundred Days Offensive; St Quentin Canal; World War II: Battle of France; Anglo-Iraqi War; Sidi Rezegh; Kohima; Imphal

The 1st Lincolnshire Artillery Volunteers were formed in 1860 as a response to a French invasion threat. They fought on the Western Front during World War I. In World War II, the unit took part in the Battle of France and Dunkirk evacuation, the Anglo-Iraqi War with 'Kingcol', the Western Desert Campaign in which it distinguished itself at the Battle of Sidi Rezegh, and finally fought as infantry in the Chindits. The unit was disbanded in 1947.

== Artillery Volunteers 1859-1908 ==
The enthusiasm for the Volunteer movement following an invasion scare in 1859 saw the creation of many units composed of part-time soldiers eager to supplement the Regular British Army in time of need. Three Artillery Volunteer Corps (AVCs) were formed in Lincolnshire in 1860 and they were brought together under the 1st Administrative Brigade, Lincolnshire Artillery Volunteers in July 1861, with headquarters at Grimsby:

- 1st Corps formed at Boston on 12 January 1860
- 2nd Corps formed at Grimsby on 27 January 1860
- 3rd Corps formed at Louth on 12 November 1860

George Morland Hutton, a former Lieutenant in the 46th Foot, was appointed Major in command in 1862 and promoted to Lieutenant-Colonel in 1866. He retained the command until 1897, when he was appointed Honorary Colonel and was succeeded as Commanding Officer (CO) by Lt-Col A. Bannister.

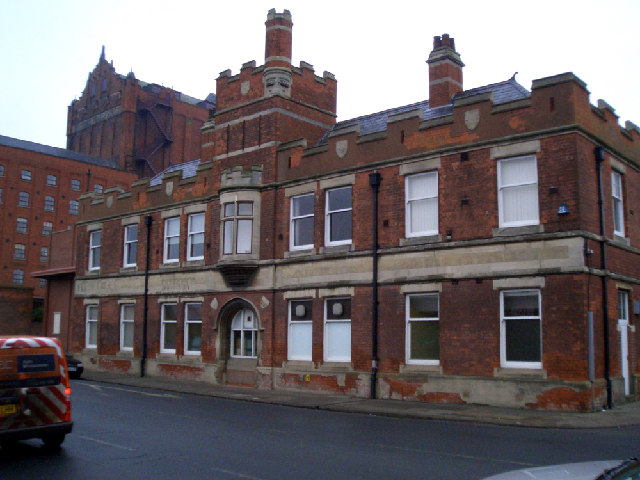
Drill Hall of the Lincolnshire Artillery Volunteers in Victoria Street North, Grimsby, 2006

In May 1880, the Corps were consolidated as the 1st Lincolnshire Artillery Volunteers, with six and a half batteries distributed as follows:

- Nos 1 and 2 at Boston
- Nos 3, 4 and 5 at Grimsby
- No 6 and a further half battery at Louth

All artillery volunteer units were attached to one of the territorial garrison divisions of the Royal Artillery (RA) in 1882, with the 1st Lincolnshire joining the Eastern Division. In 1886, the unit's title was changed to 3rd Volunteer (Lincolnshire) Brigade, Eastern Division, RA. The divisions were reorganised in 1889 when the 1st Lincolns were transferred to the Western Division and took the title became the 1st Lincolnshire AVC (Western Division, RA). By 1890, the unit comprised four Position Artillery batteries (semi-mobile units organised to work alongside the Volunteer Infantry brigades). In 1891, a drill hall was built in Victoria Street North, Grimsby.

In 1899, the Artillery Volunteers were transferred to the Royal Garrison Artillery (RGA), and when the territorial divisions were abolished the unit became the 1st Lincolnshire RGA (Volunteers) on 1 January 1902 with the role of heavy artillery.

== Territorial Force ==
When the Volunteers were subsumed into the new Territorial Force (TF) under the Haldane Reforms of 1908, it was organised into regional infantry divisions, each with an establishment of four Royal Field Artillery (RFA) brigades. The 1st Lincolnshire RGA (V) became I North Midland Brigade, RFA (TF), in the North Midland Division, with the following organisation:

- HQ at Artillery Drill Hall, Victoria Street, Grimsby
- 1st Lincolnshire Battery at Artillery Drill Hall, Main Ridge, Boston
- 2nd Lincolnshire Battery at Grimsby
- 3rd Lincolnshire Battery at 4 Eve Street, Louth
- I North Midland Ammunition Column at Grimsby

Lieutenant-Colonel Ernest Grange, who had been in command since 1902, continued as CO of the new unit. He was succeeded on 2 July 1910 by Lt-Col J. Tonge, VD, who was still CO on the outbreak of World War I.

== World War I ==
=== Mobilisation ===
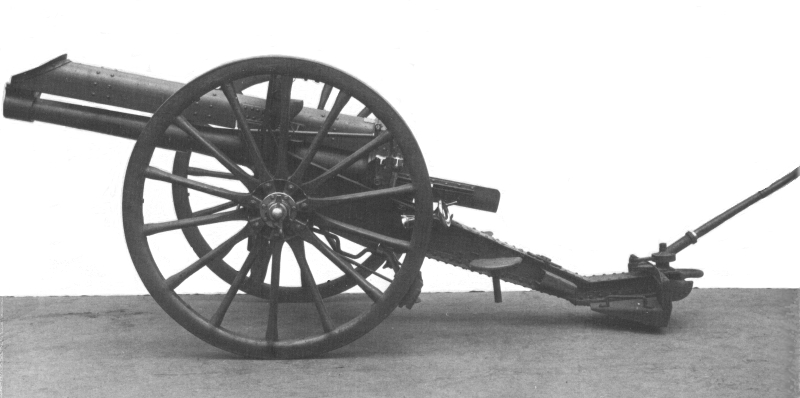
15-pounder gun

The order to mobilise was received on 4 August 1914. Shortly afterwards, the men were invited to volunteer for overseas service, and the majority having accepted this liability, the North Midland Division concentrated at Luton. In November, it moved to the area round Bishop's Stortford where it completed its war training. At the time of mobilisation, the batteries of I North Midland Bde were each equipped with four 15-pounder guns.

On 15 August 1914, the War Office issued instructions to separate those men who had signed up for Home Service only, and form these into reserve units. On 31 August, the formation of a reserve or 2nd Line unit was authorised for each 1st Line unit where 60 per cent or more of the men had volunteered for Overseas Service. The titles of these 2nd Line units would be the same as the original, but distinguished by a '2/' prefix. In this way duplicate battalions, brigades and divisions were created, mirroring those TF formations being sent overseas. The flood of recruits coming forward were enrolled in these 2nd Line units. The 2/I North Midland Brigade was assigned to the 2nd North Midland Division

=== 1/I North Midland Brigade ===
The North Midland Division began embarking for France on 25 February 1915, and by 8 March had completed its concentration at Ploegsteert in Belgium – the first complete TF division to deploy to the Western Front with the British Expeditionary Force (BEF). It was numbered the 46th (North Midland) Division shortly afterwards.

==== Hooge ====
Over the following months, the artillery supported the infantry in routine trench warfare in the Ypres Salient. On 19 July, the Royal Engineers exploded a mine under the German Army's positions at Hooge, but the infantry of 3rd Division tasked with seizing the crater had not been given a supporting artillery fireplan. As the infantry were being driven out by German artillery, counter-battery fire from 46th Division's guns and other neighbouring artillery helped to rectify the situation. When the Germans attacked the Hooge crater with flamethrowers on 30 July, 139th (Sherwood Foresters) Brigade of 46th Division was able to stabilise the line with the help of the divisional artillery.

==== Hohenzollern Redoubt ====
46th Division's first offensive operation was the Battle of the Hohenzollern Redoubt. This was an attempt to restart the failed Battle of Loos, and the division was moved down from Ypres on 1 October for the purpose. The Germans recaptured the Hohenzollern trench system on 3 October, and the new attack was aimed at this point. The artillery bombardment (by the field guns of 46th and 28th Division, backed by heavy batteries) began at 12.00 on 13 October and the infantry went in at 14.00 behind a gas cloud. The attack was a disaster, most of the leading waves being cut down by machine gun and shell fire from German positions that had not been suppressed by the bombardment.

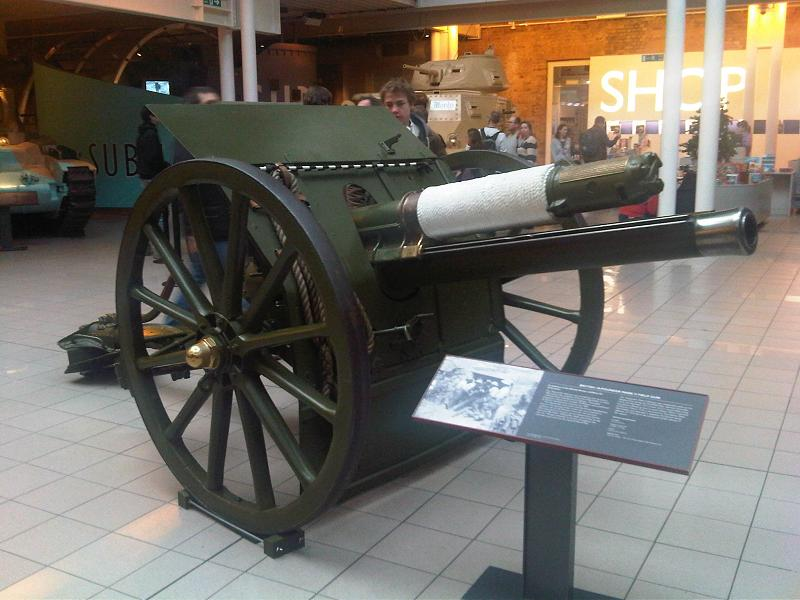
18-pounder preserved at the Imperial War Museum

1/I NM Brigade was re-equipped with 18-pounder guns in November. On 23 December, the 46th (NM) Division was ordered to embark for Egypt. It entrained for Marseille, and some of the infantry had actually reached Egypt before the order was rescinded on 21 January 1916. The artillery returned from Marseille and the whole division reassembled on the Western Front near Amiens by 14 February.

==== Gommecourt ====
On 1 May 1916, the division was ordered into the line facing Gommecourt in preparation for the forthcoming Somme Offensive. Over the first 10 days of the month, the divisional artillery took over the existing battery positions along this front and began digging additional gun pits, observation posts (OPs) and dugouts to new designs. During this period, the field brigades of the BEF were reorganised. On 19 April 1916, an extra battery of four 18-pounders was formed, and on 13 May the brigade was assigned a number as CCXXX (230) Brigade, RFA, the batteries being redesignated A, B, C and D. Then on 23 May the new D Bty was exchanged for the former 1st Derbyshire Howitzer Bty of CCXXXIII (4th NM) Bde, equipped with 4.5-inch howitzers, which became D (H) Bty. Lastly, the Brigade Ammunition Columns were merged into the Divisional Ammunition Column. Lieutenant-Colonel Tonge was awarded a CMG in the June 1916 Birthday Honours List.

Preparations were under way for the 46th and 56th (1st London) Divisions to carry out an Attack on the Gommecourt Salient as a diversion from the main offensive further south. 46th Division would attack from the north west, converging with 56th from the south west. On 18 June, 46th Divisional artillery was allocated its tasks for wire-cutting and registration of targets ahead of the attack. It was divided into two groups: CCXXX Bde was grouped with CCXXXIII Bde on the right under Lt-Col Tonge, supporting 137th (Staffordshire) Brigade, which was to make the division's right attack towards Gommecourt Wood. Right Group had its batteries dug in west and south west of Gommecourt with a concentration of three batteries around Chateau de la Haye and three others scattered around Sailly-au-Bois and Foncquevillers intermixed with 56th Division's batteries. Right Group's responsibility was the German line from the westernmost tip of Gommecourt Park to a point just north of the Gommecourt–Foncquevillers road.

46th Division used a high proportion of its 18-pounder ammunition to bombard enemy trenches and lines of communication, and a smaller proportion (about 27 per cent) of shrapnel shells to cut German Wire entanglements. One lane was to be cut by A/CCXXX Bty through the wire halfway up the side of Gommecourt Park as a diversion from the actual front to be attacked. A/CCXXX Battery had a daily allocation of 350 shells, while the other batteries each had 480.

Apart from the wire-cutting batteries, the divisional artillery was under the direction of VII Corps during the preliminary bombardment, which began on 24 June, but at zero hour it reverted to divisional control. Once the infantry went 'over the top' the field guns were to make a series of short 'lifts', almost amounting to a 'creeping barrage'.

A final 'whirlwind' bombardment by all the guns began at 06.25 on 1 July and at zero hour (07.30) 137th Brigade made its attack with 1/6th Battalion South Staffordshire Regiment and 1/6th Bn North Staffordshire Regiment in the lead. Patrols had already established that the German wire was not adequately cut: there were four partially cut lanes on the South Staffs' front and five areas of weakened wire in front of the North Staffs. In addition, German casualties during the bombardment had been few because of their deep dugouts, and when the attack went in their men emerged to receive the attack with heavy machine-gun and rifle fire from their trenches and from Gommecourt Wood. Held up by uncut wire in dead ground and by enemy fire, the brigade's leading two waves only reached the German first line and were forced to take cover in shell holes where they exchanged Grenade attacks with the Germans. The third wave was stopped by machine gun fire 100 yards (91 m) short of the first line. The British infantry were unable to keep up with the covering barrage of the 18-pounders, which was lifted onto each enemy trench line to a strict timetable: artillery observation during the attack was difficult due to the smoke and confusion. Meanwhile, the supporting waves were held up in the jumping-off trenches or in No man's land by enemy shellfire. The whole attack had halted in bloody failure by 08.00.

The Forward Observation Officer of CCXXX Bde reported the holdup at 08.16. The commander of 137th Bde attempted to bring the barrage back so that a second attack could be launched by the supporting battalions (1/5th South Staffs and 1/5th North Staffs). At about 08.45, VII Corps ordered a renewed bombardment on Gommecourt Wood, but the support units were already inextricably held up by mud and shellfire in their own trenches and the attack was postponed several times. It was not until 15.30 that 137th Bde was ready to attack again. However, the neighbouring brigade never began the advance, and 137th Bde's officers called off the attack at the last minute.

==== Reorganisation ====
The Gommecourt attack had been a diversion, and it was not renewed after the first day's disaster. 46th Division remained in position while the Somme offensive continued further south throughout the summer and autumn. There was further reorganisation amongst divisional artillery on 28 August, in which CCXXXIII Bde was broken up, with its A Bty (formerly D Bty of the CCXXX Bde) rejoining, with Right Section assigned to A/CCXXX, Left Section to B/CCXXX, and Left Section of C/CCXXXIII joining C/CCXXX to bring them up to six 18-pounders each. A final round of reorganisation came in the new year, when CCXXXII (3rd NM) Bde left the division, leaving a section of its C Bty (formerly 512 (Howitzer) Bty) to bring D (H)/CCXXX up to six 4.5-inch howitzers. For the remainder of the war the brigade had the following organisation.

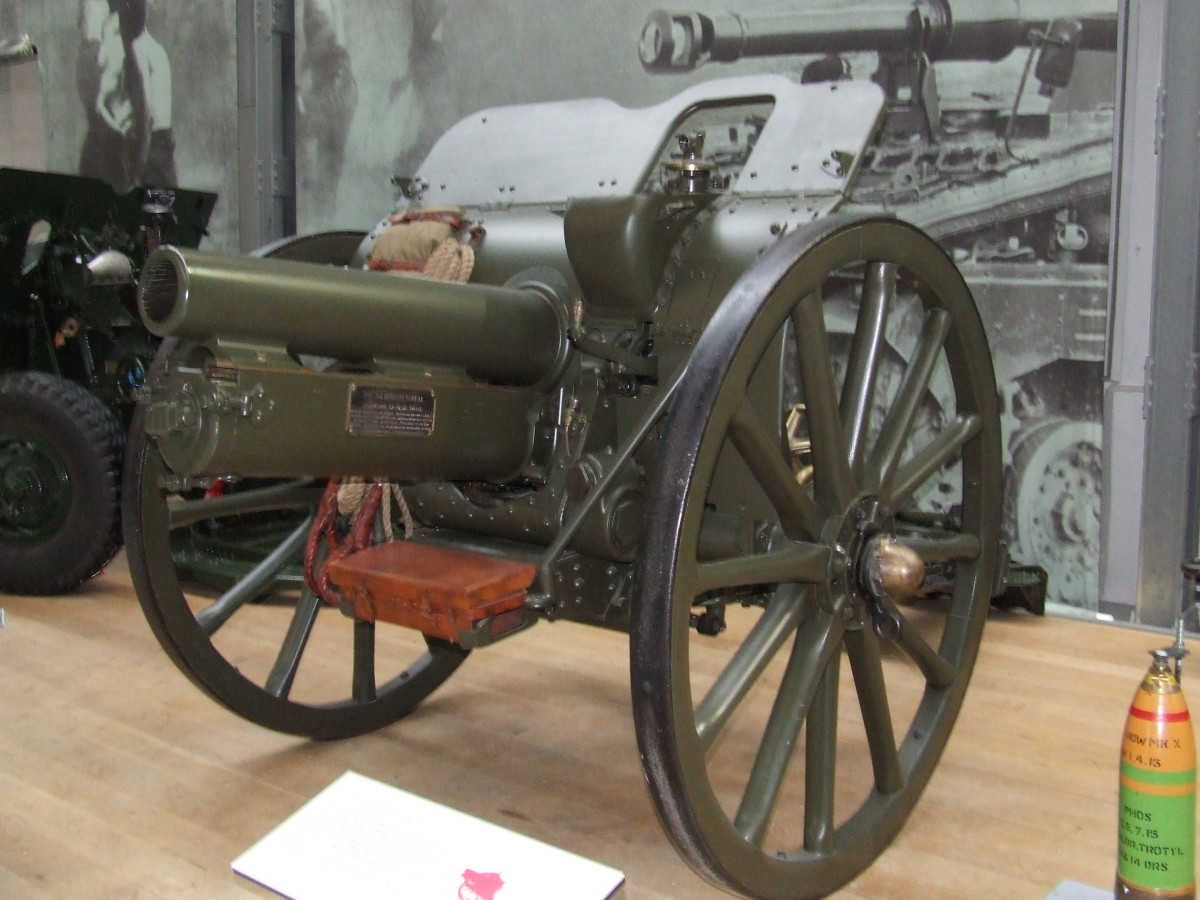
4.5-inch howitzer preserved at the Royal Artillery Museum

- A/CCXXX (1/1st Lincolnshire Bty + Right Section former D Bty) 6 x 18-pdrs
- B/CCXXX (1/2nd Lincolnshire Bty + Left Section former D Bty) 6 x 18-pdrs
- C/CCXXX (1/3rd Lincolnshire Bty + Section C/CCXXXIII Bty) 6 x 18-pdrs
- D (H)/CCXXX (1/1st Derbyshire Bty + Section 512 (H) Bty) 6 x 4.5-inch howitzers

==== Bucquoy ====
At the beginning of March 1917, patrols found that the Germans were beginning to retreat from the Gommecourt defences. 46th (NM) Division followed up slowly and cautiously, but on the night of 14 March an attack on Bucquoy Graben (trench) by 137th Brigade led to heavy casualties. The rushed attack had been ordered by V Corps headquarters despite the protests of the divisional commander, and there was not time for the artillery adequately to cut the enemy wire. The attack went in behind an artillery barrage moving at 100 yards in four minutes but although 'the assault was gallantly pressed' (Official History) it was a complete failure. The Germans eventually retreated as far as their new Hindenburg Line defences well beyond the Somme battlefields (Operation Alberich), but 46th Division was withdrawn from the pursuit on 17 March.

==== Lens ====
After rest and training, 46th Division returned to the line in the coal-mining sector around Lens in April. In May and June, the division carried out small-scale operations against Hill 65. 46th Division was now ordered to capture Lens itself, beginning on 28 June. Another divisional attack on 1 July aimed at capturing more houses and trenches. 137 Brigade attacked 'Aconite' trench behind a creeping barrage beginning at 02.47. By 07.00 the two right companies held Aconite, but the two left companies were held up in severe house-to-house fighting. A second push at 08.00 cleared the cellars round the church and caused heavy casualties to the defenders. But in the afternoon a German counter-attacks drove the battalion back to its start line. After Lens, the division was withdrawn into reserve, and did not engage in major operations again during 1917.

==== St Quentin Canal ====
The 46th Division had been very unlucky during the war, the infantry in particular taking appalling casualties at the Hohenzollern Redoubt and Gommecourt, but it gained revenge at the Battle of the St Quentin Canal on 29 September 1918 when it performed one of the great feats of World War I by crossing the canal and breaking open the Hindenburg Line. Careful artillery preparation and support was an integral part of this success. 46th Division had nine brigades of field artillery under its command, including CCXXX Bde, and several brigades of corps heavy artillery were also firing on the division's front. The bombardment began on the night of 26/27 September with harassing fire and gas shells, followed with intense bombardment with high explosive shells until the morning of the assault. Every field gun was used in carefully timed barrages: creeping barrages (including smoke shells) ahead of the attacking troops, with pauses at the end of each phase, including a standing barrage of three hours to allow mopping-up of the first objectives to be carried out, and the second wave of troops to pass through and renew the attack behind the creeping barrage. The first of these creeping barrages actually progressed at twice the normal pace while the infantry rushed downhill to seize the canal crossings; it was described in the Official History as 'one of the finest ever seen'.

The attack was a brilliant success, and by the afternoon the field artillery batteries were crossing the canal by the bridges that had been captured or thrown across, and were coming into action on the far side. Over succeeding weeks, the division took part in a succession of successive follow-up attacks: Battle of the Beaurevoir Line, Battle of Cambrai (1918), Battle of the Selle and Battle of the Sambre (1918). On 8 November 1918, in its last operation of the war, 46th Division pushed forward 138th (Lincoln and Leicester) Brigade to seize the Avesnes road, aided by concentrations of fire from the field artillery, which had managed to keep up with the rapid advance.

CCXXX Brigade was placed in suspended animation in 1919.

=== 2/I North Midland Brigade ===
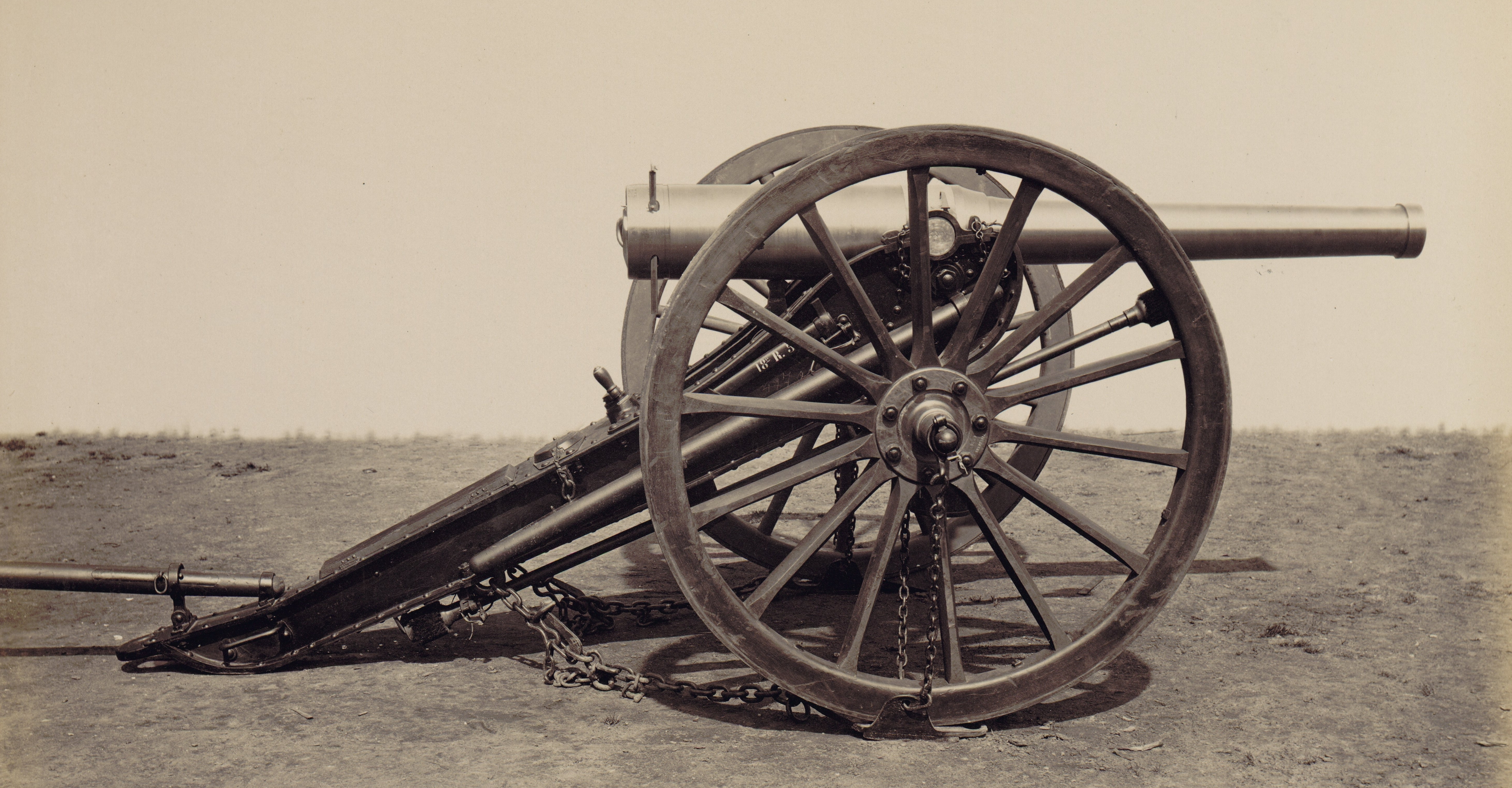
De Bange 90 mm cannon issued to 2nd Line TF units

Meanwhile, the men who had not volunteered for foreign service, together with the recruits who were coming forward, remained to form the 2/I North Midland Brigade, RFA, in the 2nd North Midland Division (59th (2nd North Midland) Division from August 1915), which concentrated round Luton in January 1915. At first, the 2nd Line recruits had to parade in civilian clothes and train with 'Quaker' guns – logs of wood mounted on cart wheels – but these shortages were slowly made up. Uniforms arrived in November 1914, but it was not until March 1915 that a few 90 mm French guns arrived for training. The division took over the requisitioned transport and second-hand horse harness when 46th Division was re-equipped and left for France. The divisional artillery were joined at Luton by the 1st Line 4th Home Counties (Howitzer) Brigade, RFA, and Wessex Heavy Bty, RGA, which were fully equipped and could lend guns for training. Later, the 59th Divisional Artillery took over some 15-pounders from a TF division that was proceeding to India. In July, the division moved out of overcrowded Luton, the artillery moving to Hemel Hempstead, where they spent the winter of 1915–16. In early 1916, the batteries were finally brought up to establishment in horses, and 18-pounders replaced the 15-pounders.

==== Ireland ====
In April 1916, the 59th Division was the mobile division of Central Force in England, and it was ordered to Ireland when the Easter Rising occurred, the divisional artillery landing at Kingstown on 28 April. The artillery moved up to Ballsbridge to support the infantry but was not engaged, and once the trouble in Dublin had been suppressed, the troops moved out to The Curragh to continue training. As was the case with the RFA units in the BEF, the brigade went through major reorganisation at this time. On 29 April 1916, the batteries were designated A, B and C, and later the brigade was numbered CCXCV (295) Brigade, RFA. At the end of May the brigade was joined by 2/1st Hampshire Royal Horse Artillery (equipped with four 18-pounder field guns rather than horse artillery guns) which became D/CCXCV. However, on 10 July, the Hampshire RHA Bty was exchanged for A (Howitzer) Bty from CCXCVIII (2/IV NM) Bde (originally 2/1st Derbyshire Bty). This became D (H) Bty, equipped with 4.5-inch howitzers. On 31 July, the Brigade Ammunition Column was absorbed into 59th Divisional Ammunition Column.

==== Western Front ====
In January 1917, the 59th Division was relieved in Ireland and returned to the UK, concentrating at the Fovant training area on the edge of Salisbury Plain preparatory to embarking for France. Before leaving for France, CCXCVII (2/III NM) Bde was broken up, with sections Btys joining A, B and C Btys of CCXCV Bde to bring them up to six 18-pounders each. Once in France, D (H) Bty was made up to six 4.5-inch howitzers by the addition of a section from C (H) Bty from CCLXXXVII (2/III West Lancashire) Bde in 57th (2nd West Lancashire) Division. For the remainder of the war the brigade had the following organisation.

- A/CCXCV (2/1st Lincolnshire Bty + Section 2/4th Staffordshire Bty) 6 x 18-pdrs
- B/CCXCV (2/2nd Lincolnshire Bty + Section 2/5th Staffordshire Bty) 6 x 18-pdrs
- C/CCXCV (2/3rd Lincolnshire Bty + Section 2/6th Staffordshire Bty) 6 x 18-pdrs
- D (H)/CCXCV (2/1st Derbyshire Bty + Left Section C (H)/CCLXXXVI Bty) 6 x 4.5-inch howitzers

59th Division began crossing to France on 17 February 1917 and concentrated around Méricourt. The last unit arrived on 17 March, the day the Germans began their retreat to the Hindenburg Line (Operation Alberich). The brigade immediately took part in following this retreat in March and April.

==== 3rd Ypres ====
The 59th Division took part in following the German retreat to the Hindenburg Line in March and April, but it was not until September that it was engaged in its first full-scale action, the phase of the 3rd Ypres Offensive known as the Battle of the Menin Road Ridge. New artillery tactics involved five belts of fire, the first two fired by 18-pounders, the third by 4.5-inch howitzers, moving at a slow pace with frequent pauses to allow the infantry to keep up. Batteries also had the task of swinging off to engage targets of opportunity, and had spare detachments to avoid exhaustion of the gunners. The barrage was described as 'magnificent both in accuracy and volume', German counterattacks were broken up by shellfire, and the attack was a resounding success. > The next phase, the Battle of Polygon Wood (26 September), was equally successful, with 176th (2/1st Staffordshire) Brigade advancing steadily behind its barrage onto the final objectives.

==== Bourlon Wood ====
59th Division was next moved south to join in the Battle of Cambrai. The division entered the recently captured line between Cantaing and Bourlon Wood on 28 November. Fierce German counter-attacks began on 30 November. Two infantry assaults were made against 176th Brigade, but both attacks were easily broken up under British artillery fire. By 4 December, the decision had been made to withdraw from the Bourlon Salient, and 59th Division held covering positions while this was carried out. On 7 December, the British were back on the line that they would hold for the coming winter.

==== Spring Offensive ====
When the German spring offensive began on 21 March 1918 (the Battle of St Quentin), 59th Division was holding the Bullecourt Salient, squarely in the path of the German thrust. Its two field artillery brigades (CCXCV and CCXCVI (2/II NM)) were bolstered by the presence of XXVI Army Field Artillery Brigade. The British knew the attack was coming: from 02.00 that morning CCXCV Bde had been firing 'counter-preparation' tasks, but the must was so thick that one battery could barely see the gunflashes of its neighbour. From 05.00 the front line and forward gun positions came under very heavy enemy fire. The situation soon became desperate, the forward infantry brigades were almost totally destroyed, and the reserves moving up were swamped. The division's field guns in the forward zone were captured after firing over open sights at the advancing Germans. Word trickled back that the forward guns of D (H)/CCXCV and 116/XXVI Btys had fired off all their ammunition and blown up their guns. The rear guns engaged the advancing enemy as they emerged from the mist towards the gun positions. One four-gun position of D (H) Bty was bombarded three times during the morning and by midday only one gun was left in action, having fired over 1000 rounds and having to be cooled with water. The detachment could see German troops massing to pass through gaps in the British wire about 800 yards (730 m) away; some others were firing at them, but the howitzer could not use direct fire. Instead the gunners worked out the position on the map and fired with a reduced charge to get in half a dozen effective shots before the Germans closed the range so they could no longer engage. The battery No 1s removed the dial sights from their damaged guns and the crews took up rifles before making a run through the gap in the back of the wire surrounding them to reach a trench. The other gun pits were defended by rear details, including the gunners using rifles and Lewis guns, until the next defence line behind could be prepared.

At 18.30 that day, Major W.P.J. Akerman, the officer commanding A/CCXCV Bty, was put in command of the remnants of the three field artillery brigades. His force consisted of:

- 117/XXVI Bty – 6 guns
- A/CCXCV Bty - 6 guns
- B/CCXCV Bty - 2 guns
- A/CCXCVI Bty - 6 guns

These guns engaged the enemy at first light the next day as they fought their way into Mory, and were still action at 21.00 in front of Divisional HQ at Behagnies. During the night of 22/23 March Akerman pulled his guns back to a position north west of Gomiecourt to fire in the Mory–Ervillers–Behagnies area, covering the defence line that the surviving brigades of 59th Division were endeavouring to establish. XXVI Brigade came under the command of 177th (2/1st Lincoln and Leicester) Brigade, and CCXCV and CCXCVI under 178th (2/1st Nottinghamshire and Derbyshire) Brigade. During the afternoon, C/CCXCV Bty got six guns back into action, and D (H)/CCXCVI received three new howitzers that day. Late in the day Akerman was ordered to retire at once to Courcelles, but his own patrols reported all quiet, so he did not withdraw until 14.00 when the infantry retired. Through the following days of the Battle of Bapaume and the 'Great Retreat', the remaining batteries of 59th Divisional Artillery remained in action under the command of 40th Division.

Although the rest of 59th Division was withdrawn, its artillery remained in the front line, under the command of 42nd (East Lancashire) Division, with which it fought at the Battles of Arras (28 March) and the Ancre (5 April).

==== Reconstruction ====
59th Division, without its artillery, was back in the line on 14 April, when it was again in the path of a German offensive (the Battle of Bailleul) and remnants took part in the 1st Battle of Kemmel Ridge (17–18 April). By now, 59th Division's infantry had been almost destroyed. The units were reduced to training cadres and the division was later reconstructed with garrison battalions. Until June, it was employed in digging rear defences, then it underwent training to enable it to hold a sector of the front line. On 25 July, the reconstructed division went back into the line, and on 21 August it once more took part in active operations.

However, the Divisional Artillery (CCXCV and CCXCVI Bdes) remained in the line, serving with various formations as required: 62nd (2nd West Riding) Division (15–24 April and 17 May–19 June), 37th Division (24 April–17 May), XVIII Corps (23 June–1 July), 5th Division (1–8 August) and 61st (2nd South Midland) Division (8–26 August).

==== Advance to Victory ====
59th Divisional Artillery rejoined its parent division on 27 August 1918. From 2 October until 11 November 1918, the division participated in the final advance in Artois and Flanders. On 2 October, 59th Division ordered two minor operations in which detachments advanced under cover of smoke and a creeping barrage; these determined that the enemy had retired, and so the division advanced against little opposition. On 16 October, the division fought its way through the old defences of Lille, and liberated the city against minimal opposition the following day. Opposition stiffened at the River Schelde was approached, but this was crossed in early November.

The Armistice on 11 November found the division astride the Schelde north of Tournai. It moved to the coast to operate demobilisation centres at Dieppe, Dunkirk and Calais in early 1919, and to train drafts for continued service in Egypt and the Black Sea. 59th Divisional Artillery including CCXCV Brigade, was demobilised on 8 August 1919.

== Interwar years ==
After the war, the unit was reconstituted as the 1st North Midland Brigade RFA (TA) in the reformed Territorial Army, with two Lincolnshire Batteries and two from the former Leicestershire Royal Horse Artillery and Nottinghamshire Royal Horse Artillery, and the headquarters moved to Nottingham. Once more the unit formed part of the 46th (North) Midland Division. In 1921, the unit was designated 60th (North Midland) Brigade, RFA (TA), changing to 60th (North Midland) Field Brigade, RA (TA) in 1924 when the RFA was subsumed into the Royal Artillery (RA).

From then until 1938, the unit had the following organisation:

- HQ Derby Road, Nottingham
- 237th (Lincolnshire) Bty, Old Barracks, Lincoln
- 238th (Lincolnshire) Bty (Howitzers), Augustus Street, Grimsby
- 239th (Leicestershire) Bty 19 Magazine Street, Leicester
- 240th (Nottinghamshire RHA) Bty, Derby Road, Nottingham

The bulk of 46th (North Midland) Division was converted into 2nd Anti-Aircraft Division in December 1935, and 60th (North Midland) left to become an Army Field Brigade in Northern Command. After the Munich Crisis in 1938, the TA was doubled in size and in October 1938 the RA adopted a new establishment for field regiments (as brigades were now termed). For the 60th (North Midland), this meant that the Leicester and Nottingham batteries left in early 1939 to form a separate unit, the 115th Field Regiment based in Leicester. 60th (North Midland) Field Regiment now consisted of the two Lincolnshire batteries, 237 at Lincoln and 239 (later 238) at Grimsby, and the regimental headquarters (RHQ) moved to Lincoln. (For some reason, the new regiment initially took the battery numbers 237 and 239, while the 115th took 238 and 240, even though the original 238 had been a Lincolnshire battery based at Grimsby. The logical numbering was only restored by an order of the Adjutant-General's office on 11 August 1941. (Note: Farndale incorrectly assumes that 115th Fd Rgt still comprised 238 and 240 Btys in India.))

The establishment of a field regiment was now two batteries each of three troops of four guns, giving a total of 24 guns. These were still World War I 18-pounders re-equipped with pneumatic tyres and towed by motor tractors.

== World War II ==
=== Battle of France ===
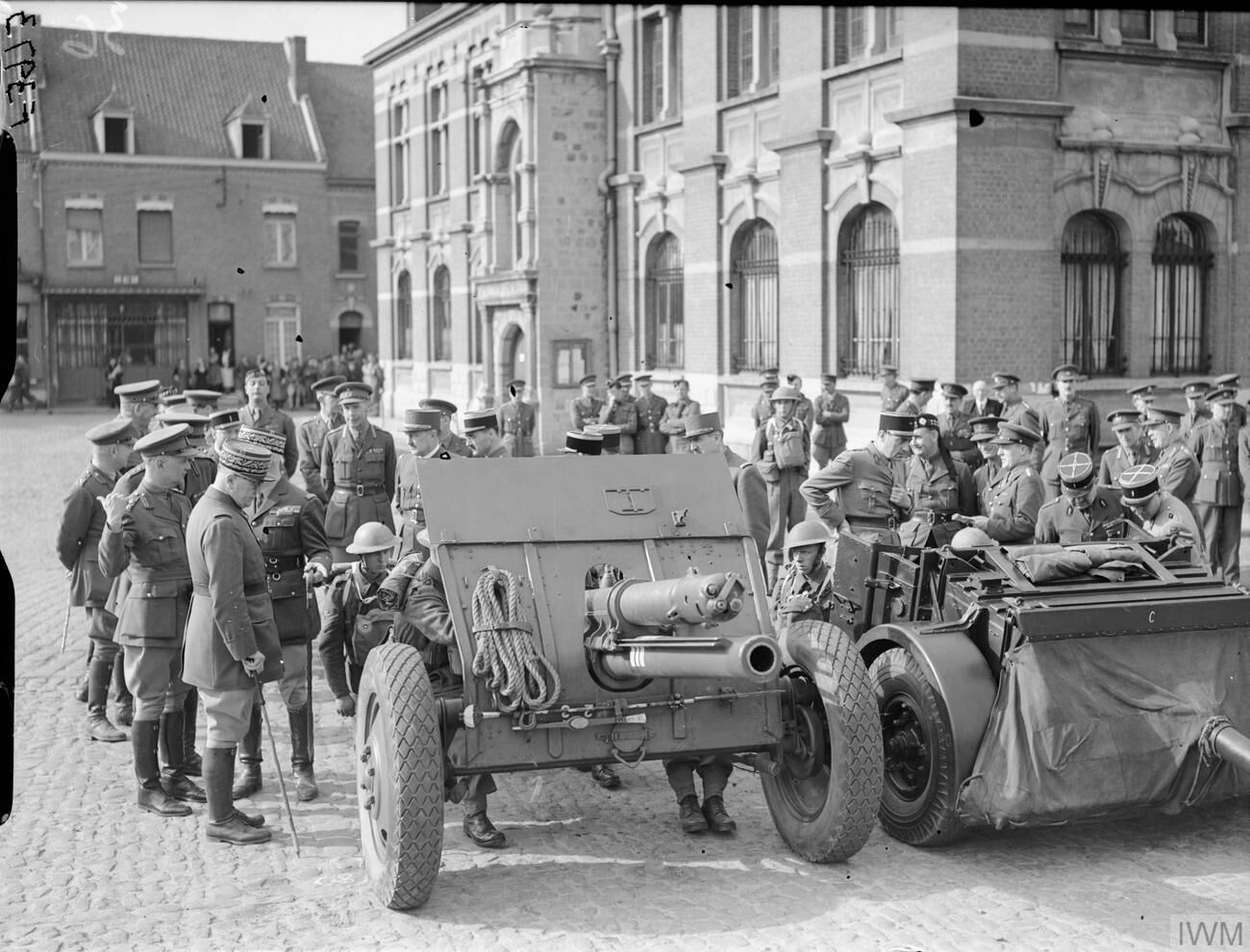
An 18-Pounder being inspected in France, April 1940

On the outbreak of war in September 1939, 60th (North Midland) Army Field Regiment mobilised at Lincoln and Grimsby, trained at Bordon Camp, and crossed to France to join the British Expeditionary Force on 7 January 1940 under the command of Lt-Col F.P. Hallifax. As an army regiment, it was assigned by GHQ to II Corps, which in turn assigned it to support 5th Division. The division was in GHQ Reserve when the 'Phoney War' ended with the German invasion of the Low Countries on 10 May.

The BEF followed the pre-arranged Plan D and advanced into Belgium to take up defences along the Dyle, with 5th Division moving up behind this line. However, the collapse of the Dutch forces and the German Army's rapid breakthrough in the Ardennes soon threatened the BEF's positions. The BEF began to withdraw to the Escaut, with 5th Division moving into GHQ Reserve at Seclin. Between 21 and 23 May, the BEF retired again to the canals along the Franco-Belgian frontier. By now, it was cut off from the rest of France, and 5th Division was holding a dangerous salient around Arras and had passed to III Corps. 5th Division was due to counter-attack southwards, but on 25 May the BEF's Commander-in-Chief, Lord Gort, ordered it northwards instead, to plug a dangerous gap near Ypres. There it came under heavy attack for three days and was supported by all available corps artillery.

The decision to evacuate the BEF through Dunkirk (Operation Dynamo) was made on 26 May, and 5th Division's stand helped to maintain the north-eastern front of the shrinking 'pocket' as troops streamed towards the port. It withdrew to the inner perimeter of the bridgehead on the night of 29/30 May. Once inside the bridgehead, all remaining guns and equipment were destroyed, and the troops took their turn to wait for boats to take them back to Southern England. The bulk of II Corps was evacuated on 31 May/1 June.

After reaching England, 60th Army Fd Rgt was assigned to XII Corps holding the vital area of South-East England, though equipment was very scarce, particularly field guns. Once the regiment had been re-equipped with modern 25-pounder field gun-howitzers, it was rostered for overseas service (together with its Signal Section of the Royal Corps of Signals) and left Home Forces in late February 1941. It reached Egypt in May, and immediately sent C troop of 237 Fd Bty to reinforce the garrison of Cyprus.

=== Iraq and Syria ===
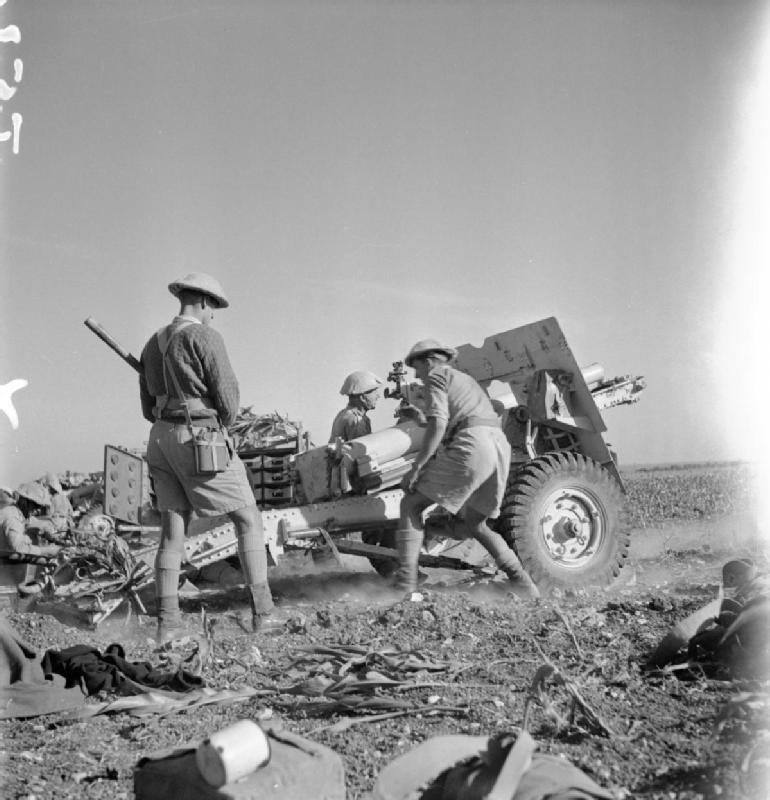
25-pounder in action during the advance into Syria, 13 June 1941.

After a German-backed coup d'état in Iraq in April 1941, the Royal Air Force (RAF) training base at Habbaniya came under siege by Iraqi Nationalist forces. As soon as it arrived in the Middle East, 60th Fd Rgt was sent up to Palestine to join the relief column, known as 'Habforce'. Brigadier 'Joe' Kingstone was sent on ahead with a Flying column named 'Kingcol' to effect a relief of the airbase as soon as possible. The field artillery component of Kingcol was provided by the 25-pounders of 237 Fd Bty.

Kingcol operated as a self-contained unit with 12 days' rations and five days' water. It moved out from Transjordan following the Amman–Baghdad road and Mosul–Haifa oil pipeline to the fort of Rutba, which had been recaptured by the Arab Legion and 2nd Armoured Car Squadron, RAF, on 10 May. Kingcol moved on from Rutba on 15 May, crossing the desert in exceptionally hot weather, digging the heavy vehicles out when they broke through the surface of the poor tracks, and under attack by German aircraft. The direct road to Habbaniya was blocked by Iraqi troops at Ramadi, but engineers from Habbaniya had bridged the canal to the south and Kingcol arrived from that direction on 18 May. 237 Battery went straight into action, firing across floodwaters at the Iraqi positions. Kingcol and the Habbaniya garrison now planned an attack on Fallujah, moving up both sides of the Euphrates (the Battle of Fallujah). A troop of six 25-pounders of 237 Bty accompanied the RAF's Assyrian Levies to advance from the south-west and seize the vital Euphrates bridge. On 19 May, the levies advanced over open boggy ground, covered by the fire of the 25-pounders, and crossed and captured the bridge in only half an hour. The Iraqis counter-attacked on 22 May, but the British and Assyrian troops fought back ferociously and the Iraqis withdrew. The British now prepared to advance on Baghdad in two small columns, each accompanied by a troop of 25-pounders. Kingcol advancing on the south side was held up by Iraqi 18-pounders, but these were engaged by 237 Bty, allowing the British troops to work their way forward. Rumour magnified the size of these small forces, and the Iraqis asked for an armistice on 30 May.

In mid-June, Habforce (including 237 Bty) joined the campaign against Vichy French forces in Syria. Its role was to advance across the desert from Iraq towards Palmyra. F Troop saw action at Oumm Ovalid with the Transjordan Frontier Force. Habforce's advance was continually harried by Vichy Air Force attacks. Meanwhile, 6th Division, which had recently been reformed in Egypt, had been sent up to handle the advance from Palestine toward Damascus, supported by the rest of 60th Fd Rgt. 1st Battalion Royal Fusiliers captured Quneitra with 25-pounder support, but the guns had then been withdrawn and the Vichy forces later re-took the town, capturing most of the Fusiliers. A troop of 60th Fd Rgt regiment supported 2nd Battalion, Queen's Regiment of 6th Division in a cross-country movement to retake it once more on 17 June. On 30 June, D Troop broke up an enemy counter-attack and destroyed four armoured vehicles. After the fall of Damascus and Palmyra, the Syria–Lebanon campaign ended on 14 July with the Armistice of Saint Jean d'Acre.

=== Western Desert ===
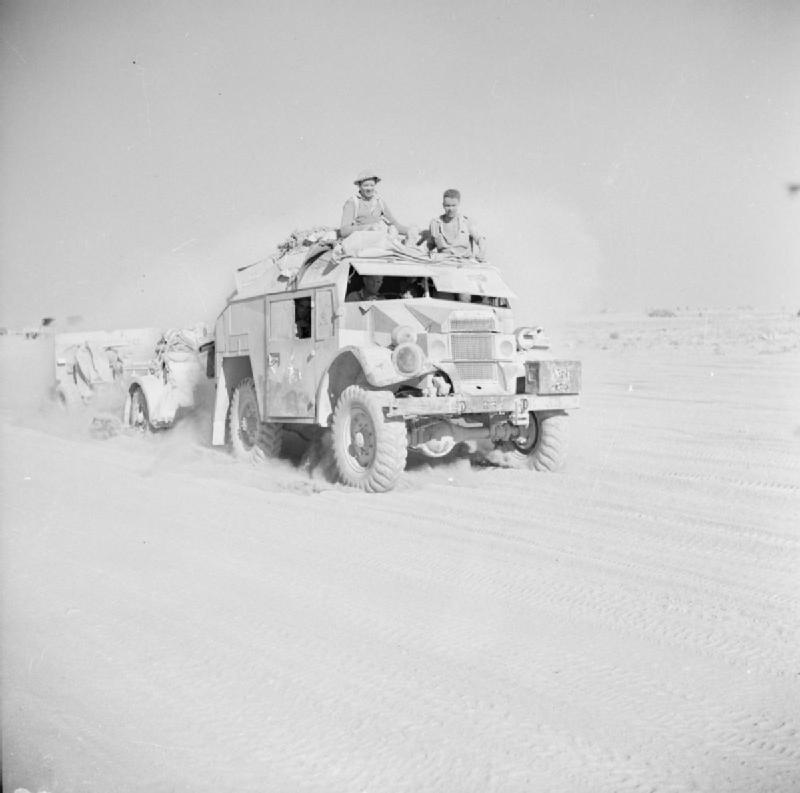
5-pounder and Quad tractor moving up to the front in the Western Desert

On 20 July 1941, the regiment joined 6th Division, which was being built up but did not yet have a full artillery complement. However, during September the infantry units of 6th Division began to be shipped into the besieged Libyan port of Tobruk (where it was renamed 70th Division as a deception) leaving the artillery behind, and 60th Fd Rgt left the division on 30 September, reverting to being an army field regiment under Eighth Army in Egypt.

Eighth Army was preparing a new offensive in the Western Desert (Operation Crusader) to drive the Axis forces back from the Egyptian Frontier across Cyrenaica and to relieve Tobruk. For this operation, 60th Fd Rgt was assigned as an additional regiment to 7th Support Group in 7th Armoured Division (a support group at this time was essentially an artillery brigade acting as the pivot group within an armoured division). The operation began at dawn on 18 November 1941, achieving surprise and taking almost all its first day objectives. The next day, 7th Armoured Division began exploitation towards Sidi Rezegh, and on 20 November 7th Support Group was ordered up to join the leading armoured brigade at Sidi Rezegh. On 21 November, 7th Armoured Division with its support group advanced northwards to meet 70th Division breaking out of Tobruk, but both Panzer divisions of the Afrika Korps intervened and bitter fighting broke out (the Battle of Sidi Rezegh). 7th Support Group under Brigadier Jock Campbell attacked Sidi Rezegh with tank support, but came under tank and artillery fire from the north and suffered badly. At one point, 50 German tanks passed through the 7th Hussars to attack S Company and Battalion HQ of 2nd Battalion Rifle Brigade but were driven off by anti-tank guns of J Battery, Royal Horse Artillery (RHA) and the 25-pounders of 60th Fd Rgt. The RHA detachment fought to the last gun, winning a Victoria Cross (VC) and the Honour title 'Sidi Rezegh' for their battery. Meanwhile, 60th Fd Rgt, deployed round the edge of Sidi Rezegh airfield, were in contact a point-blank range but kept firing despite rising casualties. As about 40 panzers advanced directly towards the guns, one Troop of the regiment moved out onto the airfield itself but was overrun. The RA historian records that 'the whole area was filled with blazing hulks, solid shot ran out and anything to hand was fired'. At dawn the following day the defenders of Sidi Rezegh could see a mass of some 80 tanks and support vehicles advancing against them some three miles away. 60th Field Regiment was very short of men, but Brigadier Campbell himself helped the gunners swing the trails of their guns round to engage these targets, before bringing up a squadron of tanks. This attack was dispersed. Later, he stood on the wing of a crashed Italian aircraft to direct the guns of 60th Fd Rgt to scatter another attack. The Afrika Korps then redirected its attack to the east and overran two infantry companies from the rear: once again Campbell helped swing the guns round to face this attack. At the end of the day the regiment was exhausted, but the Germans had never been able to close in. Campbell was later awarded the VC.

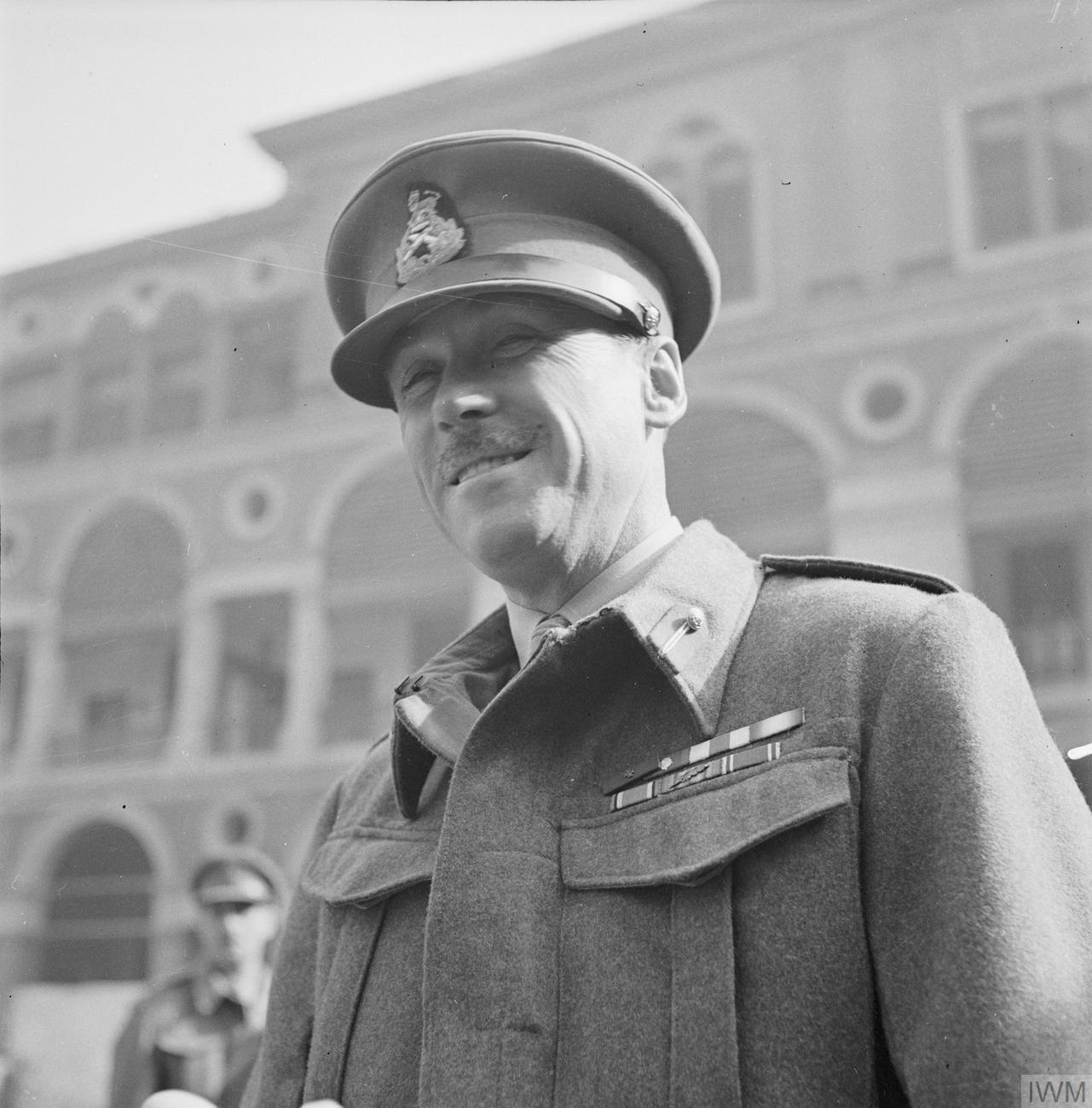
Brigadier Jock Campbell won a VC while directing the guns of 60th Fd Rgt at Sid Rezegh

On 23 November, 15th Panzer Division cut through 7th Support Group's positions on its way west, scattering the support group's vehicles. Then the following day General Erwin Rommel disengaged the Afrika Korps and made a 'dash for the [Egyptian] frontier' in Eighth Army's rear. 7th Support Group was able to engage the flank of this column as it passed by, then broke up into small raiding columns to attack the German rear and then prevent the Italian Ariete Division joining in. By now, 60th Fd Rgt only had 14 of its 24 guns left. By 28 November, Rommel was stopped at the frontier and returned westwards, Sidi Rezegh was secured, and the encirclement of Tobruk was broken.

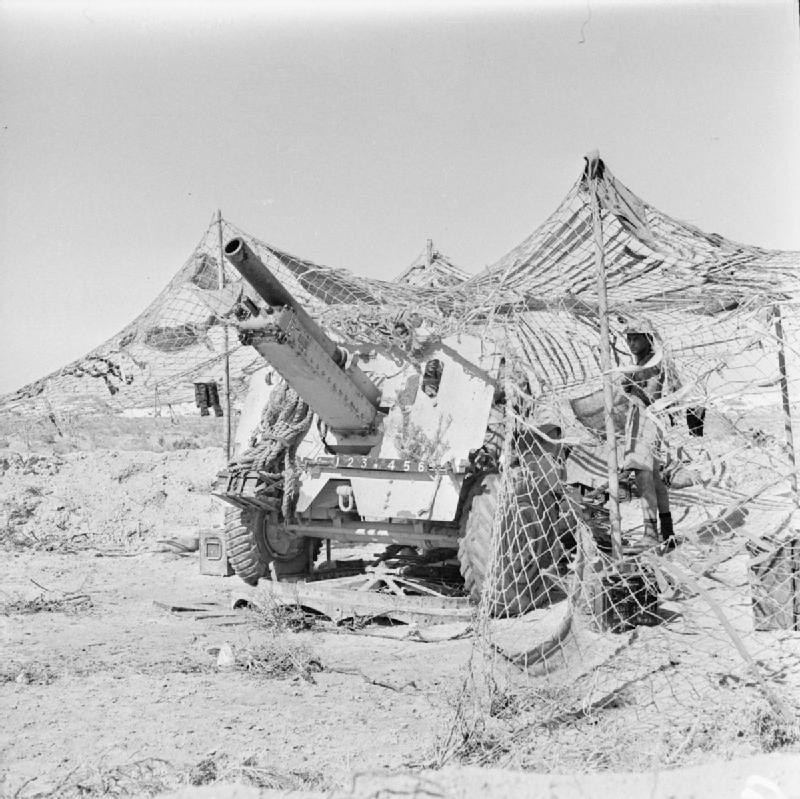
Camouflaged 25-pounder in the Western Desert

The confused fighting continued as the returning Afrika Korps attacked again in the Sidi Rezegh area, but 7th Support Group engaged the Ariete Division at Bir el Gubi and prevented its participation (4 December). Rommel decided to retire to Gazala on 7 December and Eighth Army followed up to clear Cyrenaica. While the positions round Gazala and Alem Hamza were attacked on 15 December, 7th Support Group was ordered to deal with any enemy in the open country to the south of Sidi Breghisc. The group reached Tengeder on 17 December and then turned north towards Mechili, which convinced Rommel to pull back with all speed to the Tripolitania border before he was cut off by this flanking movement. By 20 December 7th Support Group had reached Charruba and was in contact with the rear of the Ariete and Trieste Divisions, though the going had got rough and petrol was scarce. It struggled forward to a point 15 miles south of Sceleidima by 22 December

On 22 December, 7th Armoured Division was relieved; its Support Group 'was only a shadow of its former self', and 60th Fd Rgt left to refit. It rejoined 70th Division (ex-6th Division) on 31 December 1941. 70th Division moved to Syria for rest on 7 February 1942, but the Fall of Singapore on 15 February led to an urgent call for reinforcements to be sent from Middle East Forces to the Far East. 70th Division was ordered to India on 17 February, and sailed from Egypt on 28 February, arriving at Bombay on 10 March.

=== Far East ===
On arrival in India, 70th Division went to Ranchi as part of a mobile reserve for introduction into the Burma Campaign as required. This would not be until after the Monsoon rains ended in late 1942.

As early as October 1940, it had been planned that field regiments would adopt an organisation of three eight-gun batteries, but shortages meant that in most units this reorganisation was not completed for many months. By November 1942, 60th Fd Rgt had organised 442 Fd Bty.

70th Division remained at Ranchi during the first part of 1943. It was then decided to break it up to provide Long Range Penetration (LRP or 'Chindit') columns for Maj-Gen Orde Wingate's second jungle penetration mission (Operation Thursday). 70th Division began reorganising on 6 September 1943. The Chindits had no role for conventional artillery, so 60th Fd Rgt joined 23rd Brigade on 22 October 1943 to train as infantry under the designation of 60th Regiment, RA, (North Midland). Each infantry battalion reorganised as two LRP Columns; 60th Rgt provided Columns 60 and 88. (Note: Each of the infantry battalions adopted the numbers of their two pre-1881 regiments for their LRP Column numbers; the RA had no such tradition, but it is possible that the 60th Rgt RA adopted '88' in recognition of 88th (2nd West Lancashire) Field Regiment, alongside which it had served in II Corps in 1940 and which had been captured at the Fall of Singapore.) 23 Brigade moved to Indias's Central Provinces for intensive training in jungle fighting.

The CO of 60th Fd Rgt is reported to have resigned in protest at the conversion to infantry, and was replaced by Lt-Col H.G. de J. ('Mike') du Vallon, a specialist in LRP tactics, who trained the regiment and commanded one of the columns in person. The other column was commanded by Major Neil Hotchkin, son of the regiment's Honorary Colonel and a noted first class cricketer, who had first been commissioned into the regiment as a 2nd Lieutenant in 237 Bty on 26 September 1936.

Operation Thursday began on 5 February 1944 with the first LRP brigades moving into Burma to establish bases for the fly-in of the second wave. 23 Brigade was in reserve for later in the operation, but the Japanese U-Go Offensive against Imphal and Kohima changed the situation, and on 8 March the brigade was reassigned to Fourteenth Army. It was moved up to Hailakandi and then Mariani in Assam to be used in a short range penetration role.

As Operation Thursday began to turn sour, Wingate's replacement as commander of Special Force requested 23 Brigade, but instead the brigade marched into Burma on 3 April 1944 to defend the routes into Assam and cover the northern flank of Fourteenth Army in its counter-offensive towards Kohima. As the brigade advanced, it found elements of the Japanese 124th Regiment covering the flank of the 31st Division. These flank guards, aided by storms, dense jungle, and precipitous mountains, imposed considerable delays on 23 Brigade's advance towards Jessami. After the Relief of Kohima the British continued towards Imphal, still with 23 Brigade as flank guard on the Kharasom–Ukhrul axis, with the task of cutting Japanese communications back to the Chindwin River.

On 22 April, 60 and 88 columns started out into the Naga Hills. Some of the zig-zag tracks up the mountainsides and across the rivers were so narrow that no vehicles or even pack animals could use them, and the columns relied on Naga porters for transport. The Monsoon rains were exceptionally heavy, and most of the men suffered from 'Naga Hills tummy': dysentery brought on by magnesium sulfate (the laxative known as 'Epsom Salts') in the water. By 13 May, 60 Column had reached Meluri, where they established a firm base and supply-dropping point. The following day, 88 Column arrived, and with the porters began building a stronghold named 'Grimsby', and cut a landing-strip for aircraft. Although the tracks the columns had been sent to interdict were not actually being used by the Japanese, they were present at Jessami and Khanjan, which du Vallon decided to raid. After a difficult night approach, three platoons of 60 Column attacked Jessami and the reconnaissance platoons of both columns attacked Khanjan simultaneously at 06.00 on 18 May. Both places were cleared and numerous casualties caused; British wounded were evacuated from Grimsby by light aircraft. A company-strength Japanese position was discovered on 23 May a mile south of Jessami, and two platoons made a probing attack. Later, the Japanese were bombed by Hurricane fighter-bombers and left the area.

Aerial reconnaissance from Grimsby by du Vallon and Hotchkin identified a suitable site for the next firm base, named 'Grimbsy II' at Nungphung, where four important tracks met. On 24 May, 60 Column began constructing another airstrip two miles from the village, which was occupied by 88 Column. Grimsby II was a vulnerable position, only 6 miles from a Japanese garrison at Kharasom, and the columns had to fight off a determined attack on 31 May. After that, they were not troubled, even though the garrisons at Grimsby II were dangerously small when platoons were on offensive operations, possibly because the Nagas fed the Japanese false information about the strength of the columns. Supply drops every three days brought in quantities of barbed wire, flares and explosives with which to defend the positions, as well as ammunition and rations. Over the next three weeks, aggressive patrols by platoons from Grimsby II and Jessami harassed the Japanese communications round Kharasom, suffering minimal casualties, although a significant number of sick had to be evacuated by air.

On 15 June, the two columns received their orders for the last phase of the operation: the pursuit of the enemy to Ukhrul. They called in all their patrols and their mules and muleteers rejoined. Significant numbers of the men were deemed unfit for the operation and were evacuated from Grimsby II on 22 June. 23 Brigade was ready to take part in a concentric attack by XXXIII Corps against Ukhrul, but this was held up by torrential rain, and did not begin until 27 June. The following day, four columns of the brigade began moving eastwards towards Fort Keary and the other four towards Ukhrul. In this part of the encirclement, the main obstacles were climate and terrain. The columns struggled through rain and cloying mud along treacherous mountain tracks, from sub-tropical heat in valley bottoms to cold mists on the mountain tops. The troops often went hungry when air supply drops were impossible, and sickness took hold among the undernourished and exhausted men. Organised Japanese resistance ended on 8 July and the columns fanned out along the tracks to the Chindwin, past dead and dying Japanese troops and abandoned equipment. Further pursuit would have exposed the British troops to greater risks of sickness, and so the brigade was gradually withdrawn from the Chindwin. By the end of July, 23 Brigade was on its way back to India.

60th Regiment went to Bangalore for rest and reorganisation. On 29 October 1944, it was broken up, the surviving fit men being posted to 2nd Battalion Queen's Regiment, alongside which it had fought in Syria, and which had returned from Operation Thursday. The RA regiment was placed in suspended animation. 60th (North Midland) Field Regiment was never reformed, and was officially disbanded in 1947.

== Honorary Colonels ==
The following officers served as Honorary Colonel of the unit:

- George Morland Hutton, CB, VD, former CO, appointed 22 September 1897.
- A. Bannister, VD, former CO, appointed 13 December 1902.
- E.L. Grange, TD, former CO, appointed 8 July 1910.
- Brigadier-General Sir Joseph Laycock, KCMG, DSO, former CO of the Nottinghamshire Royal Horse Artillery, appointed 22 November 1922.
- Major Stafford Hotchkin, MC, former commander of 239 (Leicestershire RHA) Bty, appointed 22 November 1932.

== Memorials ==
There are two memorials to the 46th (North Midland) Division on the battlefield of the Hohenzollern Redoubt: one on the road between Vermelles and Hulluch, marking the jumping-off point of the attack, and one on the site of the redoubt itself, which lists all the units of the division.

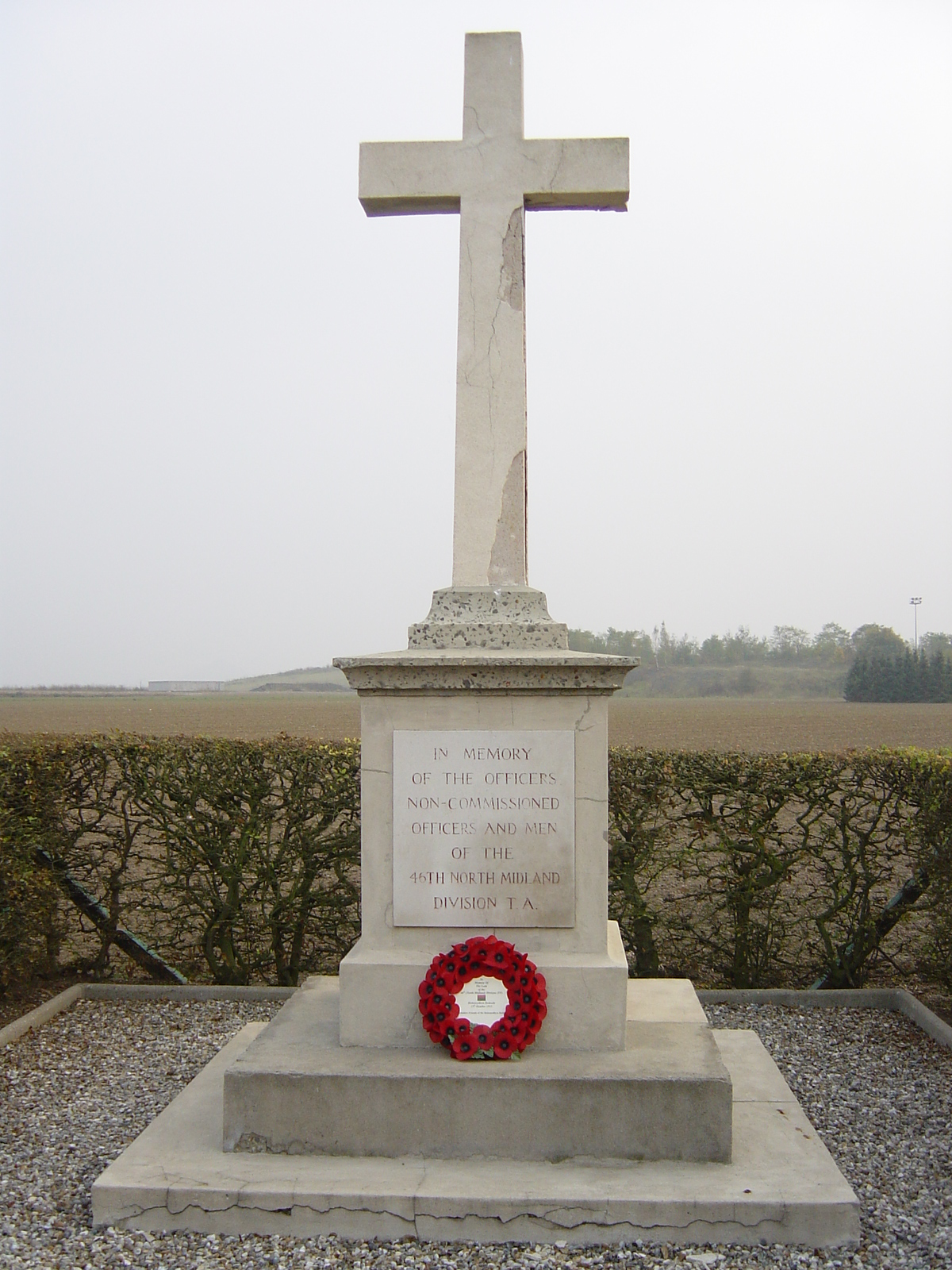
The 46th (North Midland) Division memorial on the road between Vermelles and Hulluch

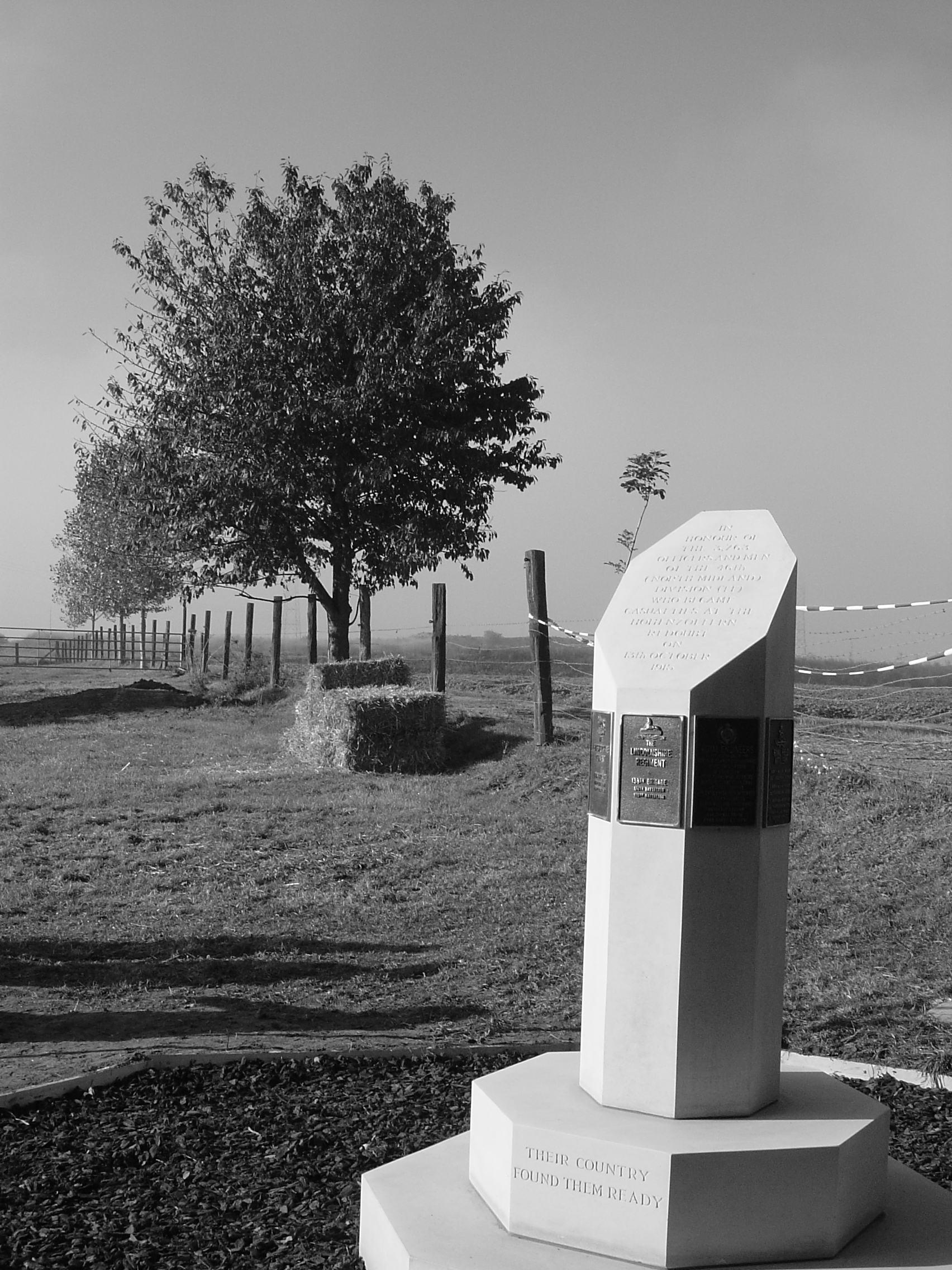
The memorial honouring the casualties of the 46th Division at the Hohenzollern Redoubt
