= Victoria Street North drill hall, Grimsby =

Victoria Street North drill hall
- Grimsby
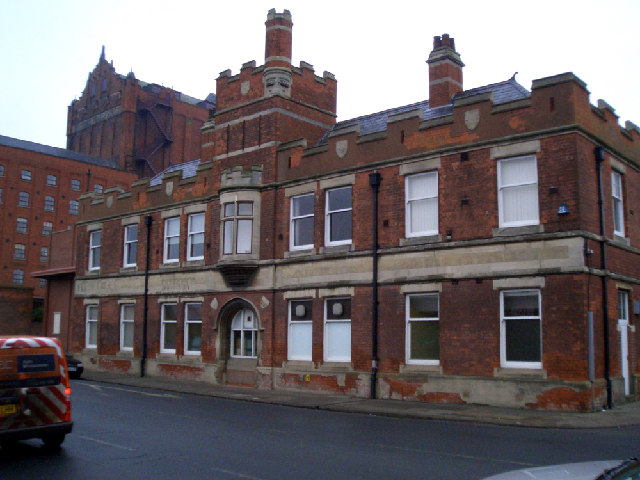
- Victoria Street North drill hall

Site information
- Type: Drill hall

Location
- Location in Lincolnshire
- Coordinates: 53.57342°N 0.07974°W

Site history
- Built: 1891
- Built for: War Office
- Architect: Ernest William Farebrother
- In use: 1891–1930s

The Victoria Street North drill hall is a former military installation in Grimsby. It is a Grade II listed building.

== History ==
The building was designed by Ernest William Farebrother as the headquarters of the 1st Lincolnshire Artillery Volunteers and completed in 1891. With the formation of the Territorial Force in 1908, the drill hall became the home of the 1st North Midland Brigade Royal Field Artillery as well as two of its three batteries (the third was at Main Ridge in Boston). The brigade was mobilised at the drill hall in August 1914 and, after being deployed to France and being re-designated 230th Brigade Royal Field Artillery in May 1916, it saw action during the Operations on the Ancre in early 1917, the Battle of Hill 70 in August 1917 and subsequent engagements. The unit was placed in suspended animation in 1919.

The drill hall was converted for industrial use by Albert Gait Limited, a printing business, in the 1930s. The printing business was acquired by Wyndeham Group in 1993 and subsequently renamed Wyndeham Gait. The business closed in April 2015 and, following a change of ownership of the property in January 2016, plans were submitted for conversion of the premises into retail space in August 2017.
