= Walter Bertram Wood =

British World War I flying ace

- Born: 25 October 1898; Grimsby, Lincolnshire, England
- Died: 11 November 1917 (aged 19); Romford, Essex, England
- Burial place: Scartho Road Cemetery, Grimsby, Lincolnshire, England
- Military career
- Allegiance: United Kingdom
- Branch: British Army; Royal Air Force
- Service years: 1915–1917
- Rank: Lieutenant
- Nickname: Bert
- Units: No. 29 Squadron RFC; No. 44 (Home Defence) Squadron RFC
- Conflicts: World War I
- Awards: Military Cross & Bar

Lieutenant Walter Bertram Wood MC* (25 October 1898 – 11 November 1917) was a British World War I flying ace credited with thirteen confirmed aerial victories.

== Early life and background ==
Wood was born in Grimsby, Lincolnshire, the younger son of Walter James Wood, a magistrate, and his wife Annie Jane. He was educated St James School, Grimsby and at Hull Technical School where he studied engineering. At the age of ten he was the first Boy Scout to be registered in Grimsby and he helped form a local troop; he later became a Scoutmaster. He began serving England in an unusual way; he organised a patrol of scouts as coast watchers until he could enlist.

== Combat career ==
He then went through the Officers Training Corps of the Artists Rifles and was commissioned as a second lieutenant in the Hampshire Regiment on 4 June 1916. On 3 March 1917 he was seconded to the Royal Flying Corps, and appointed a flying officer the same day. He was promptly assigned to No. 29 Squadron RFC on 23 April 1917.

Wood used his Nieuport 17 fighter to drive down one German Albatros D.III on 11 May 1917, and another on 5 June. On 18 June, he set an Albatros reconnaissance aircraft on fire; he described the combat in an article he wrote for a scouting magazine. His aggressive personality, that of a man capable of shooting at the enemy with a pistol if need be, shows in this excerpt:

...I make straight for the leader of their patrol.... I hear a faint pop, pop, pop and at the same time a number of small holes appear in my bottom planes. Jolly good shooting for he is still a 100 yards off.... I start turning, spinning, and diving away until I am behind him.... I get him in my sights.. Pop, pop, pop. About 20 rounds I fire at him.... A small light appears in his machine. Hurrah! he's on fire. I have hit his petrol tank.

Now the whole machine is a mass of flames. Down it crashes and flaming pieces fall off during the descent. Poor beggar! I hope a bullet hit him first: but it can't be helped....

I watch him hit the ground, and turn to look for more Boche, but there is not a plane in the sky; so I point my machine home and am greeted by hand shakes and cheers. "Oh yes we saw the beggar go down in flames, so we came home."

"Anyone missing?" I ask.

"Oh yes, poor old C--- went down out of control."

"Ah well, I'm glad now that I got that blighter in flames," I reply....

Wood won four more times in June, bringing his tally to seven. He was promoted from second lieutenant to temporary lieutenant on 1 July 1917. He scored five more triumphs in that month. His thirteenth, and last, victory came on 9 August 1917, while he was on a final "joy ride". He was rotated home to No. 44 Squadron RFC in England two days later.

Wood's final tally was one German aircraft set afire in midair, five more destroyed, and seven driven down out of control. Not counted in this total are five claims in which he drove down enemy aircraft.

=== List of aerial victories ===
Combat record
No.	Date/Time	Aircraft/ Serial No.	Opponent	Result	Location
1	11 May 1917 @ 1040	Nieuport 23 (A6721)	Albatros D.III	Out of control	Biache
2	5 June 1917 @ 2030	Nieuport 23 (B1609)	Albatros D.III	Out of control	East of Biache
3	18 June 1917 @ 0830	Nieuport 23 (B1609)	Albatros C	Destroyed in flames	East of Haucourt
4	23 June 1917 @ 1600	Nieuport 23 (B1609)	Albatros D.III	Destroyed	Estrées
5	24 June 1917 @ 1900	Nieuport 23 (B1609)	Albatros D.III	Out of control	Douai
6	25 June 1917 @ 1915	Nieuport 23 (B1609)	Albatros C	Destroyed	Douai
7	25 June 1917 @ 1915	Nieuport 23 (B1609)	Albatros C	Out of control	Douai
8	16 July 1917 @ 0850	Nieuport 17 (B1665)	Albatros D.V	Out of control	East of Ypres
9	23 July 1917 @ 1955	Nieuport 17 (B1646)	Albatros D.V	Destroyed	East of Ypres
10	23 July 1917 @ 1955	Nieuport 17 (B1646)	Albatros D.V	Out of control	East of Ypres
11	31 July 1917 @ 1300–1305	Nieuport 17 (B1553)	Albatros D.V	Destroyed	North of Polygon Wood
12	31 July 1917 @ 1300–1305	Nieuport 17 (B1553)	Albatros D.V	Destroyed	North of Polygon Wood
13	9 August 1917 @ 1830	Nieuport 17 (B1553)	C	Out of control	Menin

== Death and legacy ==
On 11 November 1917, he took off in one of two Sopwith Camels tasked to practice dogfighting; Wood was still suffering from influenza contracted in France. His Camel dived into the ground for no apparent reason, killing him; it is surmised he fainted at the controls.

Wood and his brother Second Lieutenant Edwin Leonard Wood (KIA 26 September 1917) were the subject of a memoir, Two Soldier Boys.

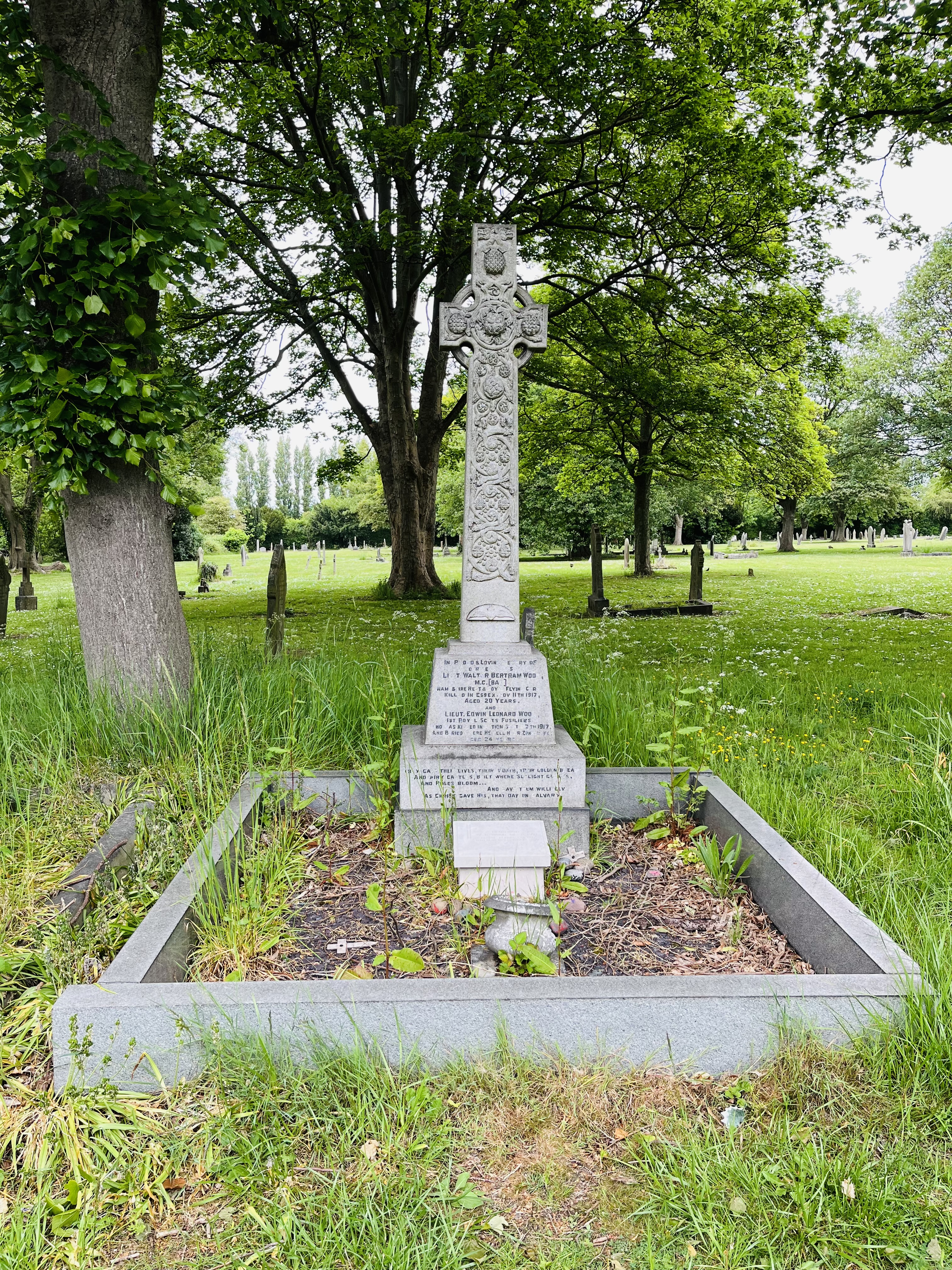
Grave of Walter Bertram Wood MC and Bar in Scartho Road Cemetery in Grimsby

Walter Bertram Wood was buried in Scartho Road Cemetery in Grimsby.

== Honours and awards ==
Military Cross
2nd Lt. Walter Bertram Wood, Hamp. R. and R.F.C.

"For conspicuous gallantry and devotion to duty on many occasions, when engaged with hostile aircraft, during which he has shown a fine offensive spirit and the utmost fearlessness. He has had no less than twenty-three combats, in the course of which he has destroyed and driven down numerous enemy machines, frequently attacking several single-handed, and on one occasion fighting with his revolver when he had run short of gun ammunition."

Bar to Military Cross
2nd Lt. Walter Bertram Wood, MC, Hamps. R. and R.F.C.

"For conspicuous gallantry and devotion to duty in attacking enemy aircraft. On several occasions he has shown admirable dash and determination in attacking hostile machines single handed, destroying some and driving others down out of control. He has also displayed great daring in attacking enemy infantry and transport with machine-gun fire at very low altitudes, in spite of attacks by hostile aircraft whilst so engaged."
