= Jimmy Fell =

English footballer

Personal information
- Full name: James Irving Fell
- Date of birth: 4 January 1936
- Place of birth: Cleethorpes, England
- Date of death: 2 February 2011 (aged 75)
- Place of death: Grimsby, England
- Position: Midfielder

Senior career*
Years	Team	Apps	(Gls)
1956–1961	Grimsby Town	166	(35)
1960–1962	Everton	27	(4)
1961–1963	Newcastle United	49	(16)
1963–1964	Walsall	21	(4)
1963–1965	Lincoln City	64	(10)
1965–1969	Boston United		
- * Club domestic league appearances and goals

James Irving Fell (4 January 1936 – 2 February 2011) was an English footballer, who played in the Football League for Grimsby Town, Everton, Newcastle United, Walsall and Lincoln City.

== Playing career ==
=== Grimsby Town ===
Fell attended Clee Grammar School for Boys, becoming a chemist at Courtaulds whilst playing part-time for Grimsby Town.

The 1958–59 season commenced with Fell taking on the role of emergency goalkeeper after regular custodian Clarrie Williams was injured in the season's opening game against Liverpool at Anfield in front of a crowd of 47,502 on 23 August 1958. With no substitutes allowed, Fell replaced Williams between the sticks and performed so heroically in the 3–3 draw that The Daily Mirror presented him with an 'Andy Capp' award.

=== Lincoln City ===
Fell joined Lincoln City in January 1964, debuting in the 2–1 victory at Hartlepools United on 11 January 1964 and scoring his first goal for the club in the 2–1 home defeat to Bradford City on 30 March 1964. He was a regular in the starting line-up in his first two seasons at Sincil Bank but played just three times at the start of the 1965/66 season before joining Boston United.

== Retirement ==
A keen angler and cricketer, in his later years he worked at Grimsby Leisure Centre and died, of natural causes, at his home in Welholme Road, Grimsby on 2 February 2011. His funeral took place at Grimsby Crematorium on 14 February.
