= Grimsby Augustinian Friary =

Friary in Lincolnshire, England

Grimsby Augustinian Friary was an Augustinian friary in Lincolnshire, England. The friary was founded in 1293 and dissolved in 1539.
