= Laceby Cemetery =

Cemetery in Laceby, Lincolnshire, England

Coordinates: 53°32′32″N 0°10′27″W

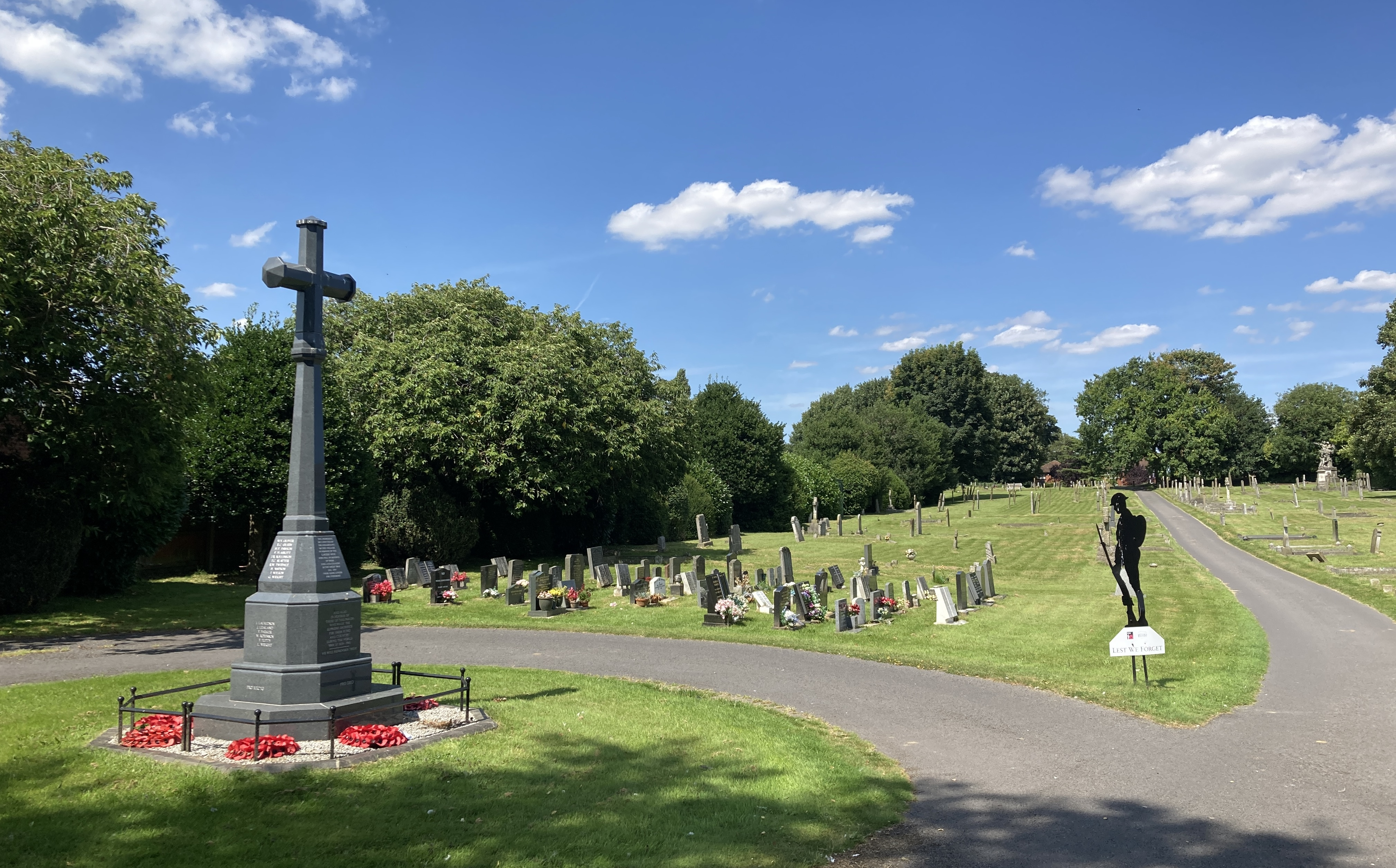
Laceby War Memorial in Laceby Cemetery in 2024

Laceby Cemetery is the burial ground for the village of Laceby in Lincolnshire. Owned and maintained by Laceby Parish Council, it is notable for the grade II listed Haagensen Memorial and Vault in its grounds, which was erected in 1897.

== History ==
Laceby Cemetery opened in July 1875, presumably when the churchyard of the parish church, St Margaret's, became full. The cemetery is made up of several acres of former farmland purchased by the village council. As each field filled with burials, the council would buy more farmland for use as a cemetery. These fields were then divided into sections, and as of 2024, there are 12 sections in the Laceby Cemetery, as well as two sections known as the Gardens of Remembrance for the burial of cremated remains.

== War memorials ==
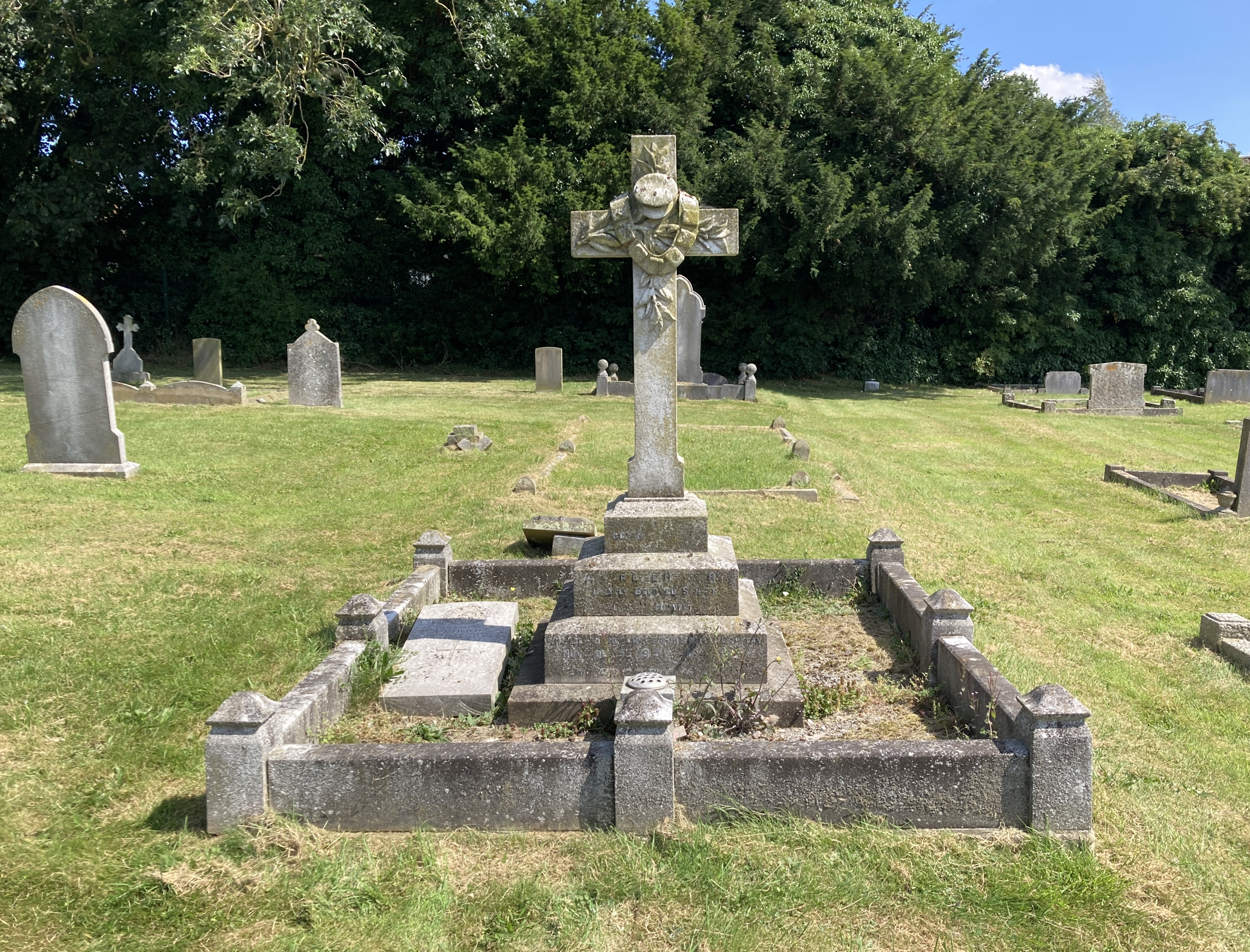
The grave of Sapper Arthur Lyne Hewitt RE in Laceby Cemetery

At the entrance to the cemetery can be found the Laceby War Memorial, a granite cross commemorating the men of the village who died in the two world wars.

Also in the cemetery can be found the graves of four military personnel, three from World War I and one from World War II, with their distinctive Commonwealth War Graves Commission (CWGC) headstones. These are:

- 1530 Driver Fred Plaskitt, 1st North Midland Bde., Royal Field Artillery, who died on 22 May 1915, aged 29
- 72638 Sapper Arthur Lyne Hewitt, F.S. Signal Depot, Royal Engineers, who died on 5 November 1915, aged 29
- 12659 Private R W Twidale, 7th Bn. Lincolnshire Regiment, who died on 28 April 1916, aged 20
- LT/JX 222462 Seaman RNPS George Perring, HMS Killingholme, who died on 2 October 1945, aged 49.

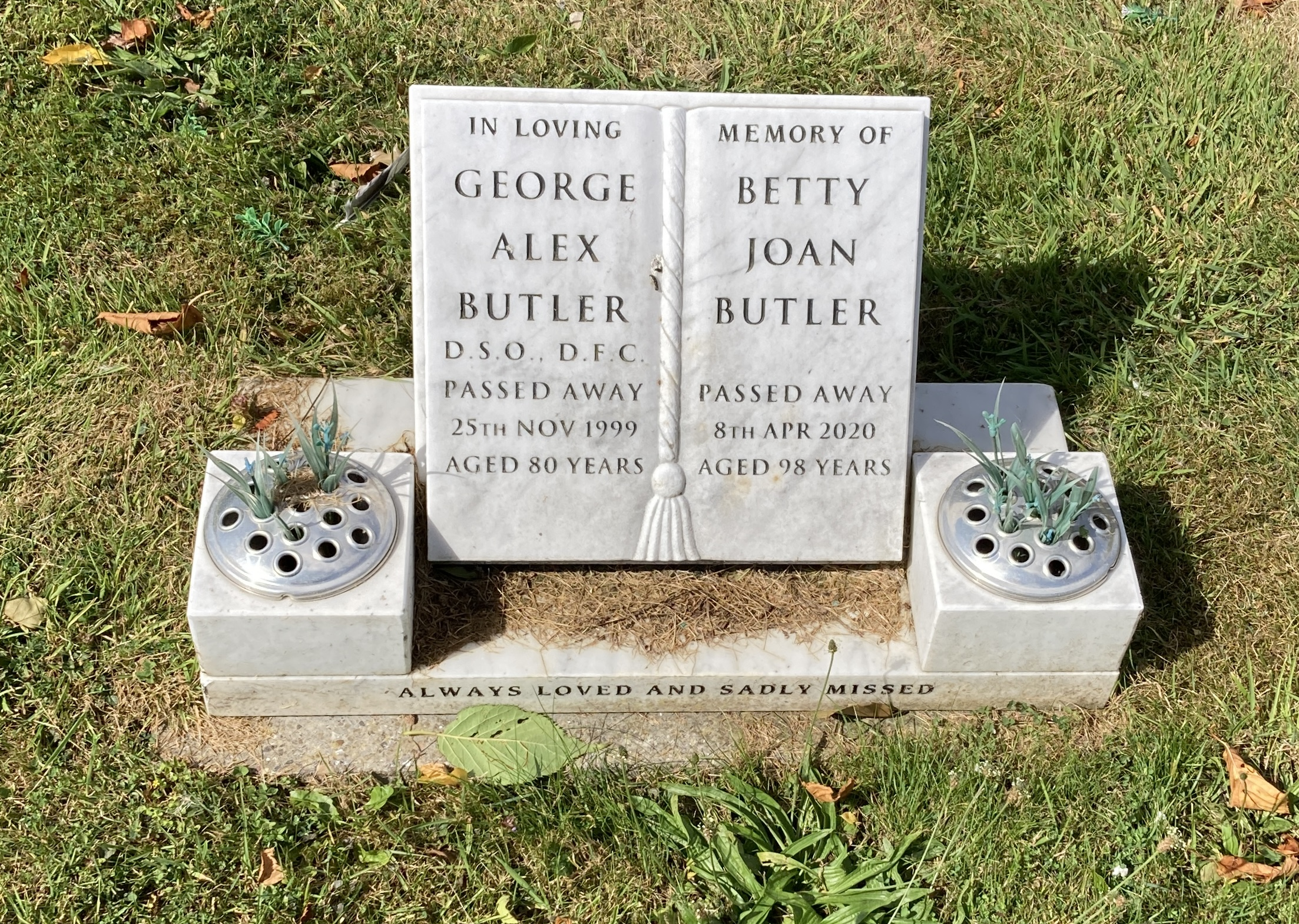
The grave of Sqn Ldr G. A. Butler in Laceby Cemetery

Here too are buried the ashes of Squadron Leader George Alexander Butler, together with those of his wife Betty Joan Butler. Butler served with the RAF during World War II as a pilot with 139 Sqdn, No 2 Group, Bomber Command, RAF in the UK (1941-1942); with 60 Sqdn, Air Forces in India, RAF in India, 1942-1944; and who later commanded 11 Sqdn, No 902 Wing, Headquarters Royal Air Force Bengal and Burma, RAF in Burma, (1944-1945).

== Haagensen Memorial and Vault ==
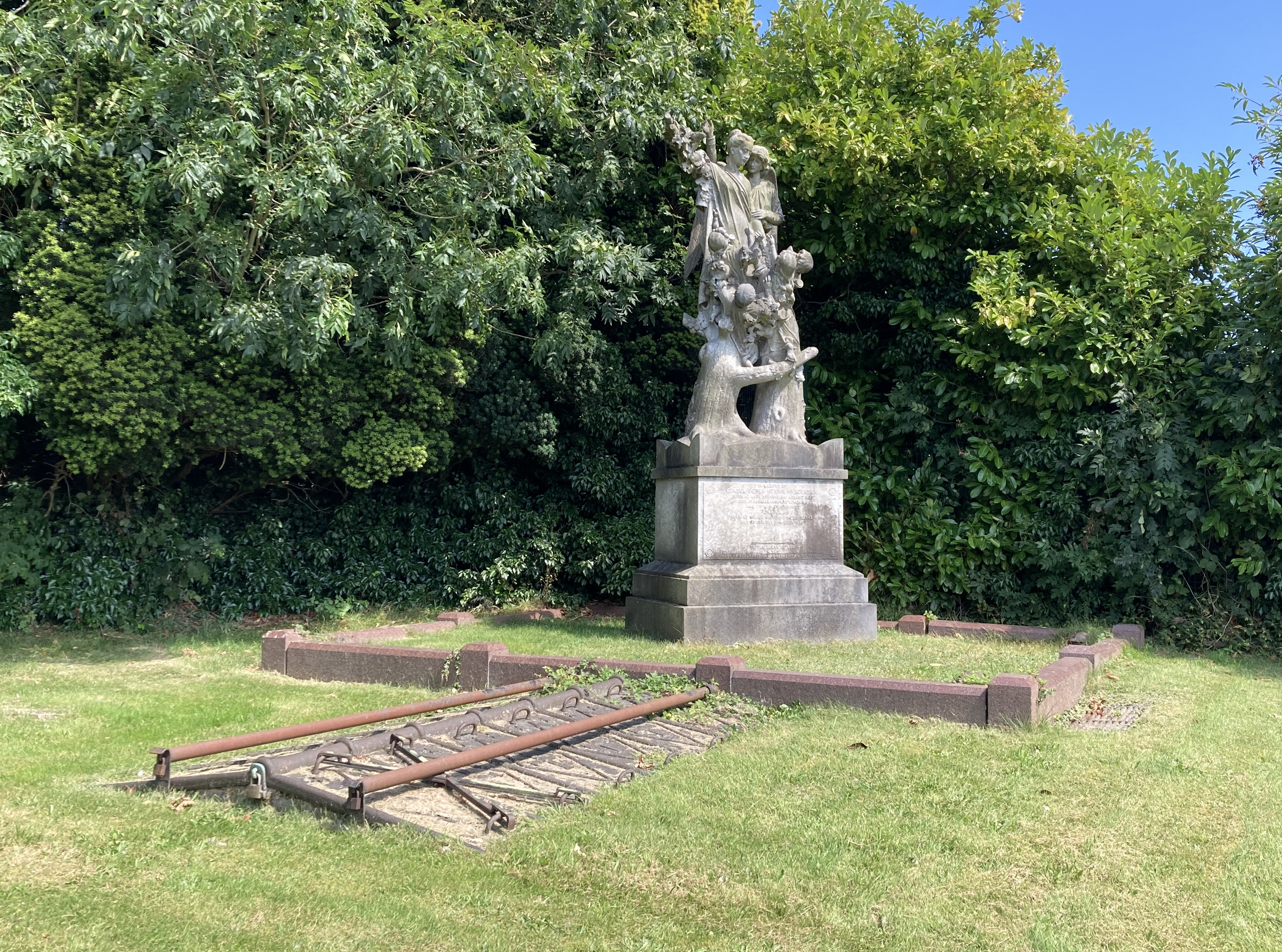
The File:Haagensen Memorial and Vault in the cemetery

The Haagensen Memorial with its subterranean vault was erected in 1897. The memorial has been grade II listed since 2015. The statue, carved from a single block of white Carrara marble, depicts Janna Eleanora Andrea Haagensen, the wife of Peter Haagensen, the consul for Sweden and Norway in Grimsby, and their four children. Janna Haagensen is shown being guided towards heaven by an angel, while her four young children emerge from two tree stumps and reach up to her imploringly. Janna looks down at her children while her raised right arm has turned into a branch of a tree; her left is held by the angel. The epitaph is carved in relief and reads:

IN MEMORY OF
CONSUL PETER HENRIK HAAGENSEN
BORN AT MOSS NORWAY 3RD AUGUST 1837
DIED AT BOURNMOUTH MAY 12TH 1919
AND OF HIS BELOVED WIFE
JANNA
BORN AT VINGER NORWAY 7TH SEPT 1845
DIED AT GRIMSBY 11TH DECR 1897
TO THE GLORY OF GOD
IN THE
HOPE OF RESURRECTION AND RECOGNITION IN ETERNITY.

The National Heritage List citation states:

Architectural and Sculptural quality: the striking design and aesthetic quality of the statue achieves a high level of sculptural quality, which is echoed in the design and artistic quality of the marble-lined vault with its relief depictions of Peter and Janna Haagensen.

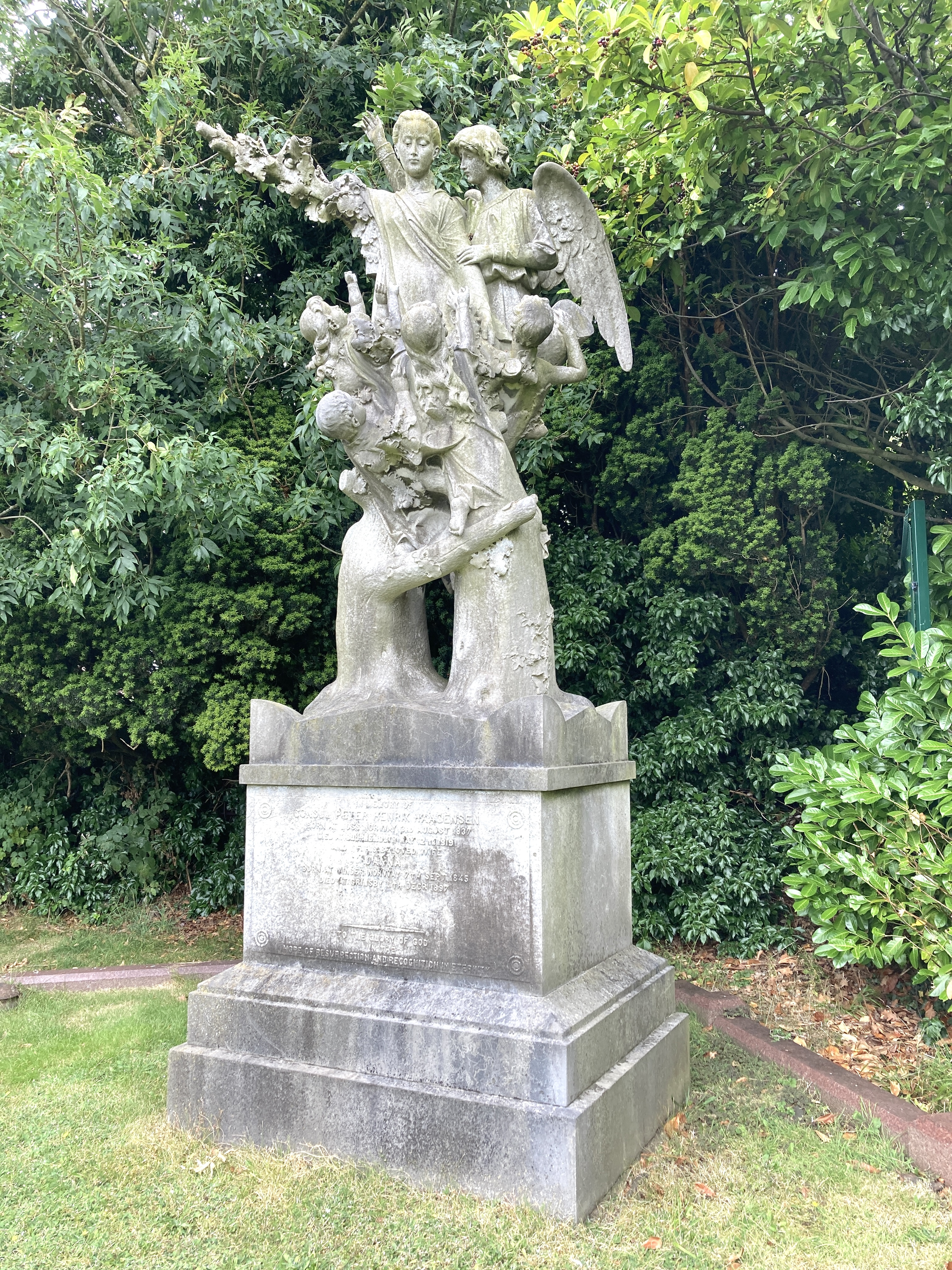
The Haagensen Memorial in 2024

It is thought that Peter Haagensen had originally intended to build a vault at Grimsby Cemetery, but this had been refused, so instead he built his marble-lined family vault at nearby Laceby Cemetery. On the death and interment of his wife, Janna Haagensen, in the vault in 1897 he had the marble memorial statue erected above it. Peter Haagensen joined his wife upon his own death in 1919, after a service held in Norwegian. The memorial's original inscription has been altered at some time, as old picture postcards reveal that the inscription had included the names of their four children: Henry (1875–1943), Clara Lina Andrea (1876–1963), the artist Frederick Hans (1878–1943), and Margit Maud Haagensen (1882–1970). This has been removed and the place of Peter's death added in its place.

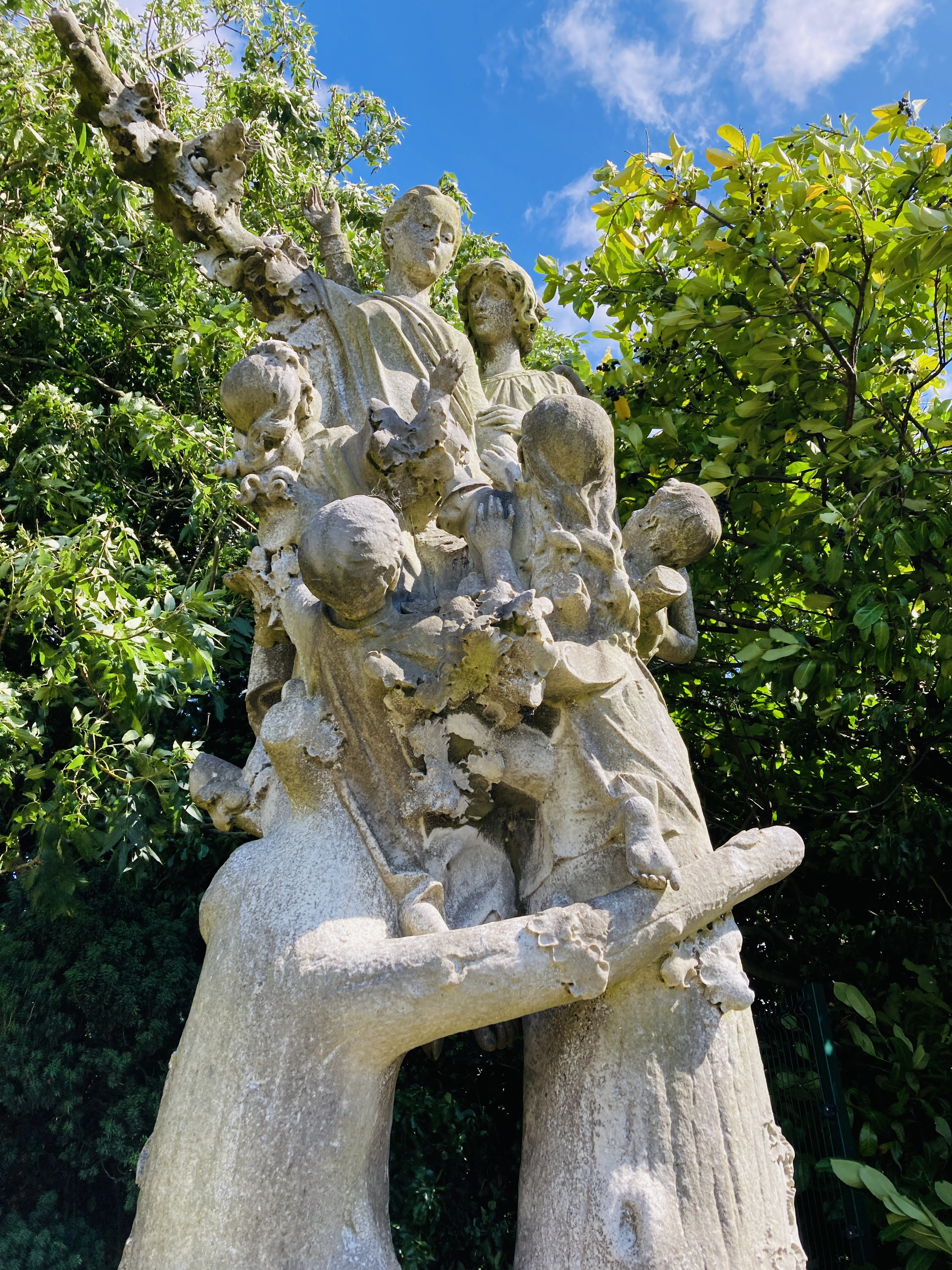
View of the statuary on the Haagensen Memorial

Such was the fame of the memorial that during the first half of the 20th century it regularly received numerous day trippers arriving by coach from Cleethorpes. The numbers of visitors were sufficient to support the nearby Laceby Tearooms, and the memorial appeared on numerous picture postcards and was reproduced in glazed Goss pottery replicas.

The marble-lined vault with its segmented arched roof is accessed by steps under twelve cast-iron hinged and padlocked flaps. Its plain mosaic floor has a coloured border of mosaic flowers. The vault's northern wall has a carved portrait in relief of Peter Haagensen set in a dark grey oval marble frame, while the southern wall has a corresponding portrait of Janna Haagensen. In the eastern wall can be found six tombs under segmental marble arches. The central pair of tombs, at ground level, are those of Peter and Janna Haagensen and are separated by a carved decorated panel in the classical style from the floor to the ceiling.
