= Hatcliffe =

Village in Lincolnshire, England

Coordinates: 53.488990°N 0.172325°W

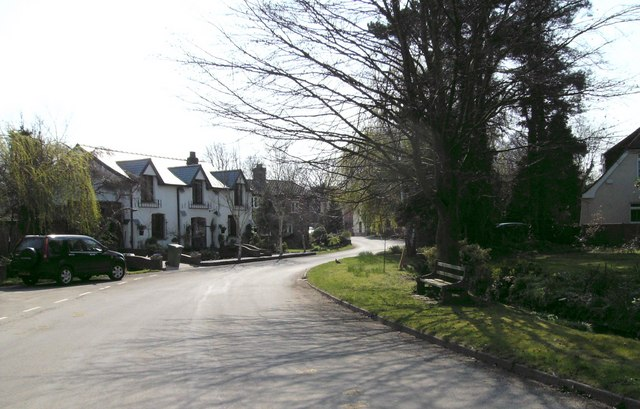
- Hatcliffe village

- Location within Lincolnshire
- Population: 118 (2011)
- OS grid reference: TA213006
  - London: 135 mi (217 km) S
- Unitary authority: North East Lincolnshire
- Ceremonial county: Lincolnshire
- Region: Yorkshire and the Humber
- Country: England
- Sovereign state: United Kingdom
- Post town: Grimsby
- Postcode district: DN37
- Police: Humberside
- Fire: Humberside
- Ambulance: East Midlands
- UK Parliament: Brigg and Immingham

Hatcliffe is a small village and civil parish in rural North East Lincolnshire, England. It is situated 6 miles (10 km) south-west from Grimsby and 1.5 miles (2.4 km) west from the A18. Less than 1 mile (1.6 km) to the north is the neighbouring village of Beelsby.

Hatcliffe sits in the Lincolnshire Wolds, an Area of Outstanding Natural Beauty.

== History ==
In A Dictionary of British Place-Names, A.D. Mills suggests the etymology of Hatcliffe to reflect a personal name and a geographic feature to mean 'the cliff or bank of a man called Hadda'.

In the 11th century Domesday Book Hatcliffe's population of 9 smallholders and 9 freemen, in 18 households, was considered a 'medium' sized village. The lord of the manor in 1066 was Ralph the Staller (or 'Ralp the Constable') and, in 1086, the lord and tenant-in-chief was Alan Rufus.

The manor was long held by the family who bore the Hatcliffe name, including William Hatcliffe who served Henry VI of England and Edward IV of England, as court physician in the 15th century. In the late 1500s, Thomas Hatcliffe, was a member of parliament for Grimsby. He was rumoured to be cursed for rebuilding his new manor house in the village from the stones of a demolished church. In the 1960s, American academic John Leslie Hotson, then at Yale University, published his theory that Thomas's son, William Hatcliffe, was the 'Mr W.H.' to whom William Shakespeare dedicated his sonnets in 1609.

== St. Mary's Church ==
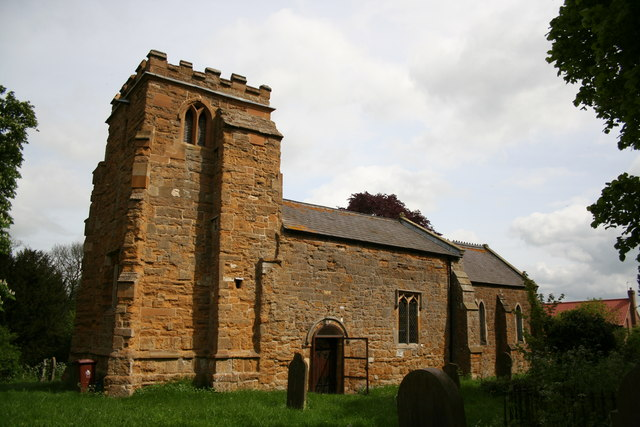
St.Mary's Church, Hatcliffe

The parish church of St Mary's dates from the 13th century, and contains memorials dedicated to the Hatcliffe family dating to 1525. The former post office in the centre of the village has been converted to a house, and stands by a small stream with stone bridge crossings.

== Electrical substation ==
The village has a large substation, known as a grid supply point, with a 132kV line to Laceby.

The substation opened in October 1961, and cost £500,000. It supplied 350 square miles, and was supplied by two 132kV lines direct from Lincoln power station, and another to Keadby power station, via Grimsby.

£2000 of cable, 3000 metres, was stolen in August 1994. There was another cable theft in July 1996.
