= River Freshney =

River in North East Lincolnshire, England

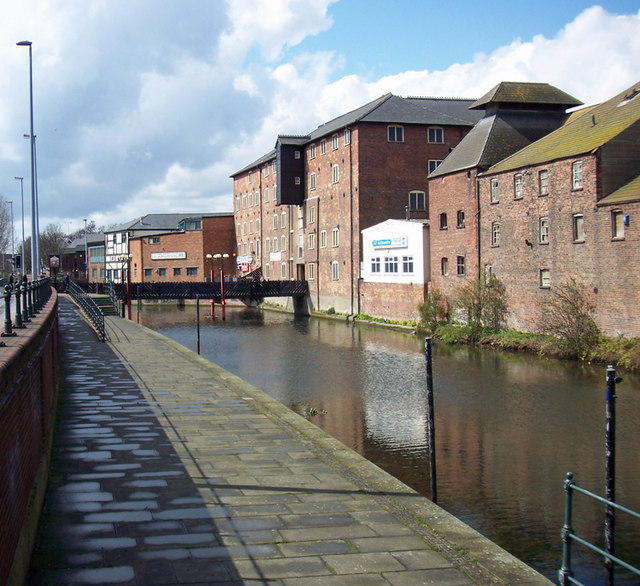
- The old granary and riverside walk above Alexandra Dock

Location
- Country: England
- Counties: Lincolnshire

Physical characteristics
- Source
  - location: Beelsby
  - coordinates: 53.503132°N 0.174338°W
  - elevation: 60 m (200 ft)
- Mouth
  - location: Grimsby Docks
  - coordinates: 53.567877°N 0.082890°W
  - elevation: 0 m (0 ft)
- Length: 14 km (8.7 mi)

The River Freshney is a river in the English borough of North East Lincolnshire. The town of Grimsby stands on its banks. It rises from at least four springs on the edge of the Lincolnshire Wolds, although local folklore and oral tradition has it springing from Welbeck Hill. Originally it entered the tidal Humber estuary at Pyewipe, north west of Grimsby, but has been re-routed and now supplies Grimsby Docks. There was an existing haven within the borough of Grimsby but this suffered greatly with silting problems so in 1669 landowners agreed to the diversion of the Freshney through the town to the haven to provide fresh water and improve the flow. It is believed the work was completed in the very early 18th century.

== Route ==
The river rises from a series of springs. The furthest south rises just to the north of Beelsby, close to the 200-foot (60 m) contour. It flows north and is joined by another stream which flows past some earthworks, dating from the English Civil War, before both pass under the A18 Laceby to Barnoldby le Beck road. Team Gate Drain rises just to the west of Waltham and flows to the west. It is joined by the stream from Welbeck Hill, which rises close to the A18 road and the 65-foot (20 m) contour. Having combined, they flow northwards, passing under the A46 road and the old course of the road through Laceby, both of which are called Grimsby Road. The river is called Laceby Beck as it flows along the eastern edge of Laceby.

Another stream from Aylesby joins before it passes between some lakes at Laceby Acres. The New Cut Drain runs parallel to the river from here, and they pass under the A1136 road and either side of the Freshney Bog Nature Reserve. Cromwell Road and the railway line to Grimsby cross in quick succession, after which the New Cut Drain follows the original course of the river, while the river turns sharply under the railway line to the docks, and under a series of bridges in Grimsby. These carry Boulevard Avenue, Earl Street and Alexandra Road over the channel. Another sharp turn brings the river into Alexandra Dock. There is a sluice with flap doors on it across the river at this point, and Freshney pumping station assists the discharge when water level prevents gravity discharge. Corporation Bridge is a grade II listed Scherzer rolling lift bridge and carries Corporation Road over the dock. It was designed by Alfred C Gardner, the Docks Engineer for the London and North Eastern Railway, and was installed in 1925 by Sir William Arrol & Co., the Glasgow-based engineering company. It has four cast iron and steel spans, one of which opens, and the structure, which replaced the previous swing bridge, was formally opened by the Prince of Wales on 19 July 1928. After the A180 Westgate road crosses Alexandra Dock, Union Dock connects it to Royal Dock, at the end of which a lock connects it to the Humber.

== Hydrology ==
Freshney Bog was constructed in 2001 as a washland, which could be used to hold excess water when the channel below it could not cope with the flow in the river. It is a major part of the flood defence system for Grimsby. During the floods of 2007, more than a full month's rainfall fell in 24 hours on the river catchment. Groundwater levels rose by over 16 feet (4.9 m) in the week prior to the floods, and with the ground saturated, the capacity of the river and the New Cut Drain was exceeded. Freshney Bog storage area filled up, but had insufficient capacity for the volume of water, and as a result, flooding occurred, which affected 200 houses. At Laceby Beck gauging station, normal levels of the river vary between 0.62 and 2.55 feet (0.19 and 0.78 m), but on 8 November 2019, they reached 3.64 feet (1.11 metres) at 16:15 GMT. This height is believed to be the highest the river has reached since measurements began. On 2 April 2018, they reached 3.46 feet (1.05 m) at 21:15 BST which is deemed to be the second highest recorded level of the river. On 27 October 2019, the river rose to 1.01 metres, was its third highest recorded level. Changes to the flood management scheme after the floods of 2007, enabled the excess water from the river at these higher levels to be managed.

It was previously thought that a level of 2.43m was reached in 1985. At that height, Grimsby Town centre and the West Marsh areas would have been under 1-1.3m of water. The Environmental Agency have since updated this anomaly as no flood occurred to that extent in 1985.

The Environment Agency carried out flood alleviation work on the New Cut Drain in 2013, to reduce the risk of properties flooding. This work was planned after the significant flooding event that occurred on 21 July 2007 when the river rose to a record (at the time) 3.25 feet (0.99 m). The work involved sheet piling of some 770 yards (700 m) of the drain, and installation of perforated filter drains to collect surface water. A new flood bank between the river and the Willows Estate was constructed, and parts of the existing bank between the New Cut Drain and the Freshney Washland Flood Storage Reservoir were removed, to allow more water to be impounded when river flows are high.

Concerns do remain with residents along the river, as these levels have always lowered after the precipitation event has ended. Wybers Wood, The Willows and areas from New Haven Terrace to the Riverhead are all at general risk, with reports of river water seeping through defence walls and up through roads/pavements adjacent to the river.

== Water Quality ==
The Environment Agency measure water quality of the river systems in England. Each is given an overall ecological status, which may be one of five levels: high, good, moderate, poor and bad. There are several components that are used to determine this, including biological status, which looks at the quantity and varieties of invertebrates, angiosperms and fish. Chemical status, which compares the concentrations of various chemicals against known safe concentrations, is rated as good or fail.

The water quality of the Freshney was as follows in 2019.

Section	Ecological Status	Chemical Status	Length	Catchment	Channel
Laceby Beck / River Freshney Catchment	Poor	Good	9.7 miles (15.6 km)	39.06 square miles (101.2 km^{2})	heavily modified

The reasons for water quality being less than good include physical modification of the channel, groundwater abstraction, sewage discharge and poor soil management of the surrounding agricultural land. Like most rivers in the UK, the chemical status changed from good to fail in 2019, due to the presence of polybrominated diphenyl ethers (PBDE) and mercury compounds, neither of which had previously been included in the assessment.

The Friends of the Freshney was formed in the 2000s under the Chairmanship of Chris Scott, and have organised regular clean-ups of the lower river. In 2017, a Great River Rescue event was organised by Grimsby RiverCare and other organisations. It was supported by the Fire and Rescue Service, Friends of the Freshney, the River Freshney Fishing Group and North East Lincolnshire Council. 96 volunteers from 17 local groups spent around three hours each removing rubbish from the river between Boulevard Avenue and Anderson Street.

The river from Haven Gardens through to the weir at Fildes St is now regularly managed by The Canoe River Cleaner and Dylan Tuplin. This predominantly includes removal of waste, and algae management (in the warmer months). Regular bank picks are also performed to keep the area clean. By working alongside Grimsby In Bloom, Lilliput Waste Disposal, other organisations and local residents it is making a difference with the main focus being on regular management to keep it in good shape.

== Points of interest ==
Point	Coordinates (Links to map resources)	OS Grid Ref	Notes
Royal Dock lock	53.5832°N 0.0705°W	TA278113	mouth
Discharge into Alexandra Dock	53.5676°N 0.0833°W	TA270095	
Diversion from original course	53.5749°N 0.1097°W	TA252103	
New Cut Drain joins Humber	53.5810°N 0.0931°W	TA263110	original mouth
A1136 bridge	53.5639°N 0.1292°W	TA240091	
Laceby Acres	53.5544°N 0.1473°W	TA228080	
Junction with Team Gate Drain	53.5276°N 0.1569°W	TA222050	
Welbeck Hill spring	53.5191°N 0.1609°W	TA220040	traditional source
Beelsby spring	53.5031°N 0.1744°W	TA211022	source

== See also ==
- List of rivers of England
