= Welbeck Hill =

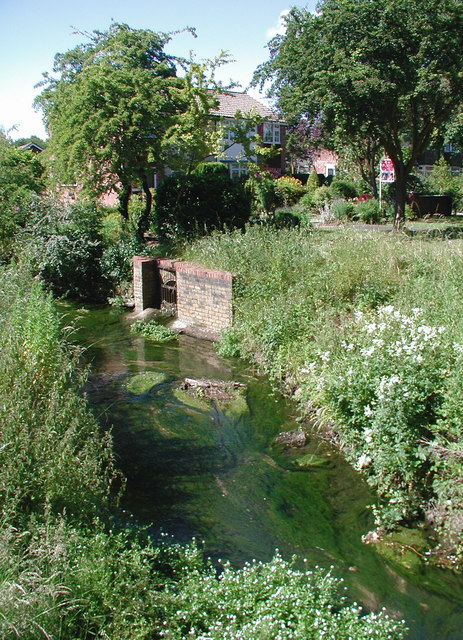
Laceby Beck, fed by Welbeck spring, flows into the River Freshney before it reaches Grimsby.

Welbeck Hill is the site of Roman and early Saxon pottery finds, and an Anglo-Saxon cemetery, located around 1.75 miles from Laceby, and around 3 miles from Riby, in North East Lincolnshire, England.

== 19th century and Welbeck spring ==
George Oliver visited the site during the 19th century and sent his report to The Gentleman's Magazine in October, 1832. Oliver's interest was in what he believed were ancient defensive earthworks, ramparts and a ditch, around the hill, and its proximity to Barton Street, a prehistoric 'north–south route' in North East Lincolnshire, and later Roman road. Oliver suggested the hill may have been the site of a watchtower for an 'exploratory camp' that could have retreated behind the fortifications in times of danger.

He also described the nearby Welbeck spring:

"...which was 'uniformly dry during the winter season, but in the month of February or March, a loud rumbling noise is heard in the ground for several days, and at length the water bursts forth in a hundred places as to fill in a few hours the whole area of the well or enclosure of earth where it is situated..."

The spring, with others, joins the Laceby Beck, before flowing into the River Freshney, and then into the sea at Grimsby. The Beck is an 'internationally rare' spring-fed, chalk stream, which 'has experienced chronic low flows during the summer months', and is the focus of a conservation program that commenced in January, 2013.

== Pottery ==
Excavations on the southern slope of Welbeck Hill led to finds of a Roman 'grey ware dish and lug handle, also heavy well-fired shards and a cooking pot with a flat topped rim'. Anglo-Saxon pottery fragments were similar to those found near the cemetery. There was also an associated area of dark soil with 'much animal bone'.

== Cemetery ==
Excavations of the Anglo-Saxon cemetery were begun by G. Taylor in 1962 after ploughing disturbed remains. Three burial areas, dating from around the mid-5th and 6th centuries, have since been identified; north/south along the hill crest, east/west on the hill's western slope and a deposit of cremations on the eastern slope. From 1962 to July 1976, 76 graves and 5 cremations were recorded. In one grave the decapitated body of a woman was placed on top of that of an 'important old man'.

The cemetery passed out of use in the late 6th or early 7th centuries, and its activity, in the early Anglo-Saxon period, when furnishing graves was still common, is credited with the reason most burials had associated artefacts. The variety of well-preserved grave goods included iron knives, cruciform brooches, beads and a cooking pot. Spiral designs featured on 'serpent rings' and a round brooch. Textile remains show similar skills to those from the Anglo-Saxon cemetery at Sutton Hoo, in Suffolk, with seams on 'luxurious cushion or pillow covers' disguised with plaits or other forms of decorative sewing.

A silver bracteate that was found in a woman's grave bore a runic inscription law but may have been a miscopy of lap, for the word lapu, a 'magical word', commonly found on bracteates of the period. The word's meaning is 'invitation' or 'summons' and 'might refer to an act of offering, or the initiation to a cult'. Also found in the woman's grave were bronze objects, 'glass and amber pearls, an iron knife, an iron buckle, an iron ring, 4 iron keys and an ivory ring'.

Taylor retained the archaeological archive, which was privately sold after his death in 2017. It was subsequently acquired by North Lincolnshire Museum with funding support from the Art Fund, The Headley Trust and the Museums Association Beecroft Bequest.
