= John Whitgift =

Archbishop of Canterbury from 1583 to 1604

The Most Reverend and Right Honourable John Whitgift
- Archbishop of Canterbury
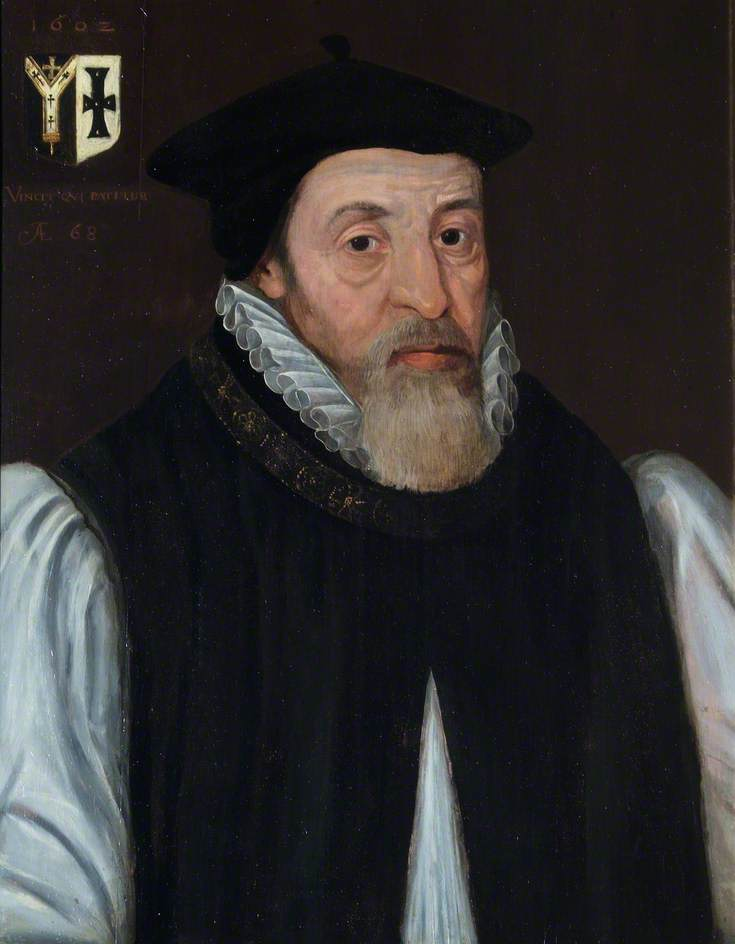
- Church: Church of England
- Diocese: Canterbury
- Installed: August 1583
- Term ended: 29 February 1604
- Predecessor: Edmund Grindal
- Successor: Richard Bancroft

Orders
- Ordination: 1560
- Consecration: 21 April 1577 by Edmund Grindal

Personal details
- Born: c. 1530 Great Grimsby, Lincolnshire, England
- Died: 29 February 1604 (aged 73/74) Lambeth, London, England
- Buried: Croydon, Surrey
- Parents: Henry Whitgift

John Whitgift (c. 1530 – 29 February 1604) was an English clergyman and academic who served as Archbishop of Canterbury from 1583 until his death in 1604. Noted for his hospitality, he was somewhat ostentatious in his habits, sometimes visiting Canterbury and other towns attended by a retinue of 800 horses. Whitgift's theological views were often controversial.

== Early life and education ==
He was the eldest son of Henry Whitgift, a merchant, of Great Grimsby, Lincolnshire, where he was born, probably between 1530 and 1533. The Whitgift family is thought to have originated in the relatively close East Yorkshire village of Whitgift, adjoining the River Ouse.

Whitgift's early education was entrusted to his uncle, Robert Whitgift, abbot of the neighbouring Wellow Abbey, on whose advice he was sent to St Anthony's School, London. In 1549 he matriculated at Queens' College, Cambridge, and in May 1550 he moved to nearby Pembroke Hall, Cambridge, where the martyr John Bradford was his tutor. In May 1555 he was elected a fellow of Peterhouse.

== Links with Cambridge ==
Having taken holy orders in 1560, he became chaplain to Richard Cox, Bishop of Ely, who collated (that is, appointed) him to the rectory of Teversham, just to the east of Cambridge. In 1563 he was appointed Lady Margaret's Professor of Divinity at the University of Cambridge, and his lectures gave such satisfaction to the authorities that on 5 July 1566 they considerably augmented his stipend. The following year he was appointed Regius Professor of Divinity, and became master first of Pembroke Hall (1567) and then of Trinity in 1570. He had a principal share in compiling the statutes of the university, which passed the great seal on 25 September 1570, and in the November following he was chosen as vice-chancellor.

While at Cambridge he formed a close relationship with Andrew Perne, sometime vice-chancellor. Perne went on to live with Whitgift in his old age. Puritan satirists would later mock Whitgift as "Perne's boy" who was willing to carry his cloak-bag – thus suggesting that the two had enjoyed a homosexual relationship.

== Francis Bacon ==
Whitgift taught Francis Bacon and his older brother Anthony Bacon at Cambridge University in the 1570s. As their tutor, Whitgift bought the brothers their early classical text books, including works by Plato, Cicero and others. Whitgift's authoritarian beliefs and conservative religious teachings had a profound impact on Bacon, as did his teaching on natural philosophy and metaphysics. Bacon would later disavow Whitgift, writing to Elizabeth I to warn her against Whitgift's attempts to root out the "careful and diligent preachers in each parish".

== Promotions and improvements ==
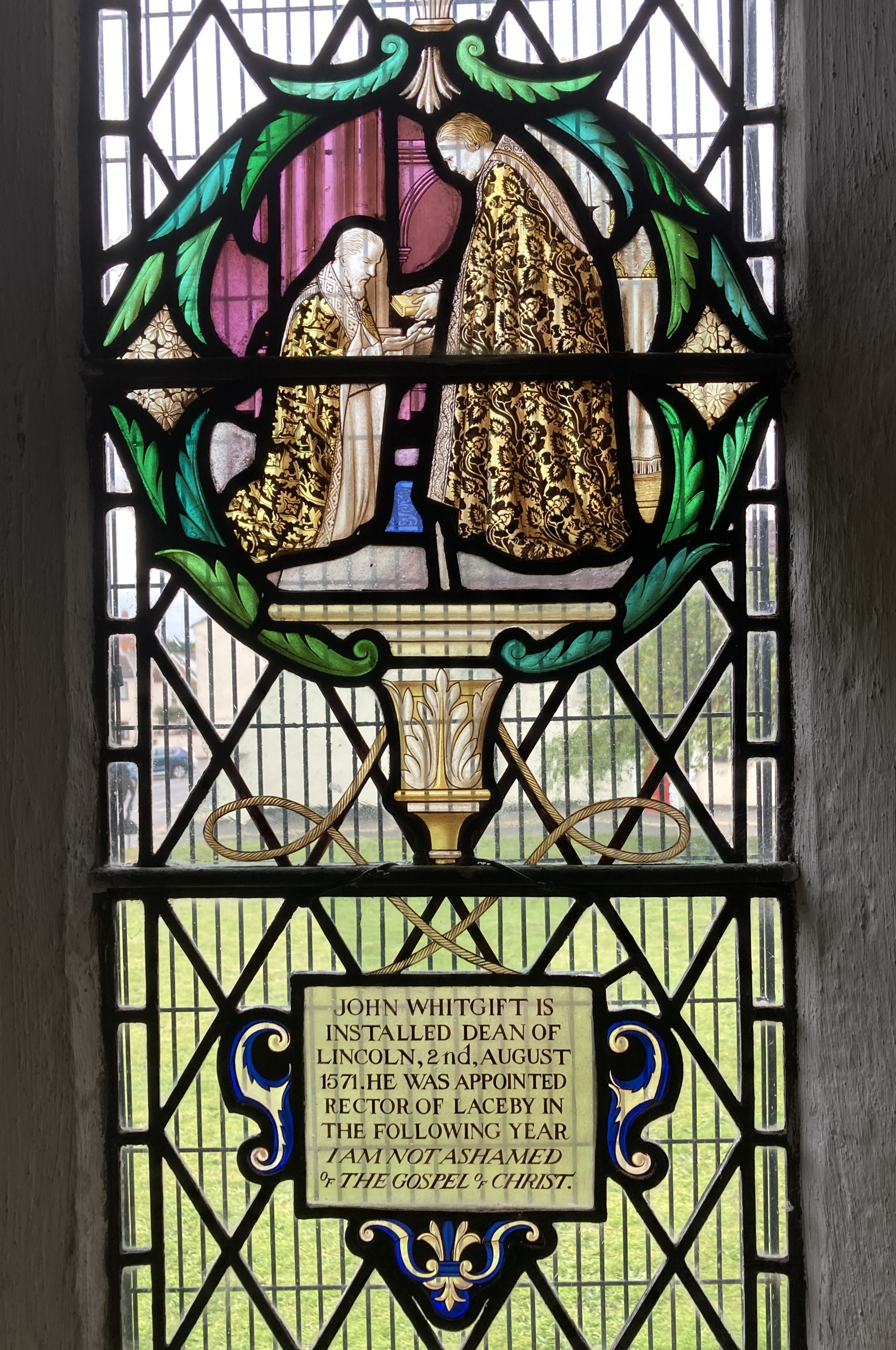
Detail from a window in St Margaret's church in Laceby in Lincolnshire depicting the confirmation of Whitgift as Dean of Lincoln in 1571

Whitgift's theological views were controversial. An aunt with whom he once lodged wrote that "though she thought at first she had received a saint into her house, she now perceived he was a devil". Thomas Macaulay's description of Whitgift as "a narrow, mean, tyrannical priest, who gained power by servility and adulation..." is, according to the author of his 1911 Encyclopædia Britannica entry, "tinged with rhetorical exaggeration; but undoubtedly Whitgift's extreme High Church notions led him to treat the Puritans with exceptional intolerance". In a pulpit controversy with Thomas Cartwright regarding the constitutions and customs of the Church of England, his oratorical effectiveness proved inferior, but he was able to exercise arbitrary authority: together with other heads of the university, he deprived Cartwright of his professorship, and in September 1571 Whitgift exercised his prerogative as master of Trinity to strip him of his fellowship. In June of the same year Whitgift was nominated Dean of Lincoln. In the following year he published An Answere to a Certain Libel entitled an Admonition to the Parliament, which led to further controversy between the two churchmen. From 1572 to 1577 he was Rector of St Margaret's church in Laceby in Lincolnshire. On 24 March 1577, Whitgift was appointed Bishop of Worcester, and during the absence of Sir Henry Sidney in Ireland in 1577 he acted as vice-president of Wales.

== Archbishop of Canterbury, 1583–1604 ==
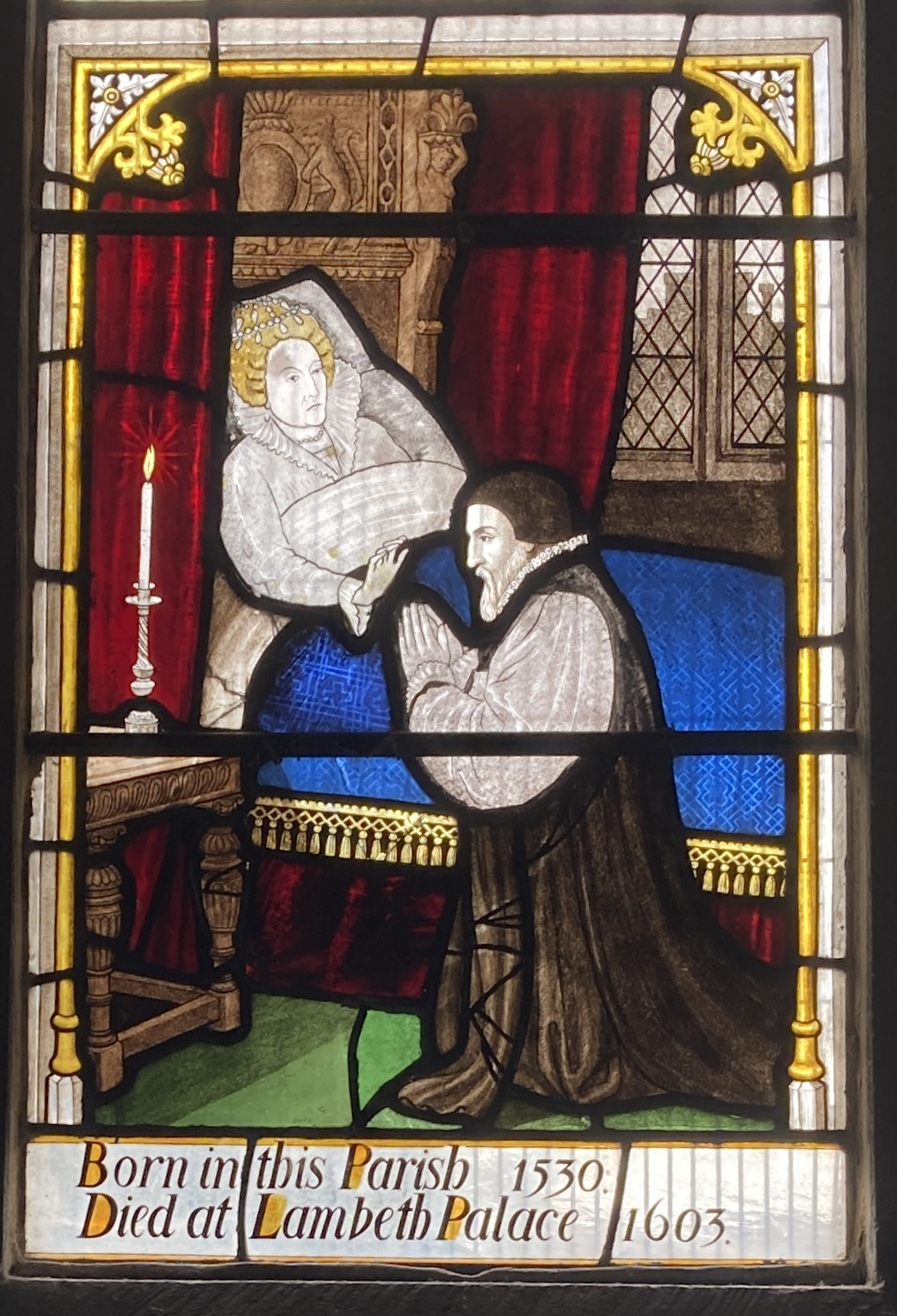
Whitgift at Queen Elizabeth's deathbed, stained glass at Grimsby Minster. The archbishop's death is given as 1603 because of Old Style and New Style dates.

In August 1583 he was appointed Archbishop of Canterbury to replace Edmund Grindal, who had been placed under house arrest after his disagreement with Queen Elizabeth I over "prophesyings" and died in office. Whitgift placed his stamp on the church of the Reformation, and shared Elizabeth's hatred of Puritans. Although he wrote to Elizabeth remonstrating against the alienation of church property, Whitgift always retained her special confidence. In his policy against the Puritans and in his vigorous enforcement of the subscription test he thoroughly carried out her policy of religious uniformity.

He drew up articles aimed at nonconforming ministers, and obtained increased powers for the Court of High Commission. In 1586, he became a privy councillor. His actions gave rise to the Martin Marprelate tracts, in which the bishops and clergy were strongly opposed. By his vigilance the printers of the tracts were discovered and punished, though the main writer Job Throkmorton evaded him. Whitgift had nine leading presbyterians including Thomas Cartwright arrested in 1589–90, and though their trial in the Star Chamber for sedition did not result in convictions they did agree to abandon their movement in return for freedom.

Whitgift took a strong line against the Brownist movement and their Underground Church in London led by Henry Barrow and John Greenwood. Their services were repeatedly raided and members held in prison. Whitgift repeatedly interrogated them through the High Commission, and at the Privy Council. When Burghley asked Barrow his opinion of the Archbishop, he responded: "He is a monster, a miserable compound, I know not what to make him. He is neither ecclesiastical nor civil, even that second beast spoken of in revelation." Whitgift was the prime mover behind the Act against Seditious Sectaries which was passed in 1593, making Separatist Puritanism a felony, and he had Barrow and Greenwood executed the following morning.

In the controversy between Walter Travers and Richard Hooker, he prohibited the former from preaching, and he presented the latter with the rectory of Boscombe in Wiltshire, to help him complete his Ecclesiastical Polity, a work that in the end did not represent Whitgift's theological or ecclesiastical standpoints. In 1587, he had Welsh preacher John Penry brought before the High Commission, and imprisoned; Whitgift signed Penry's death warrant six years later.

In 1595, in conjunction with the Bishop of London and other prelates, he drew up the Calvinist instrument known as the Lambeth Articles. Although the articles were signed and agreed by several bishops they were recalled by order of Elizabeth, claiming that the bishops had acted without her explicit consent. Whitgift maintained that she had given her approval.

Whitgift attended Elizabeth on her deathbed, and crowned James I. He was present at the Hampton Court Conference in January 1604, at which he represented eight bishops.

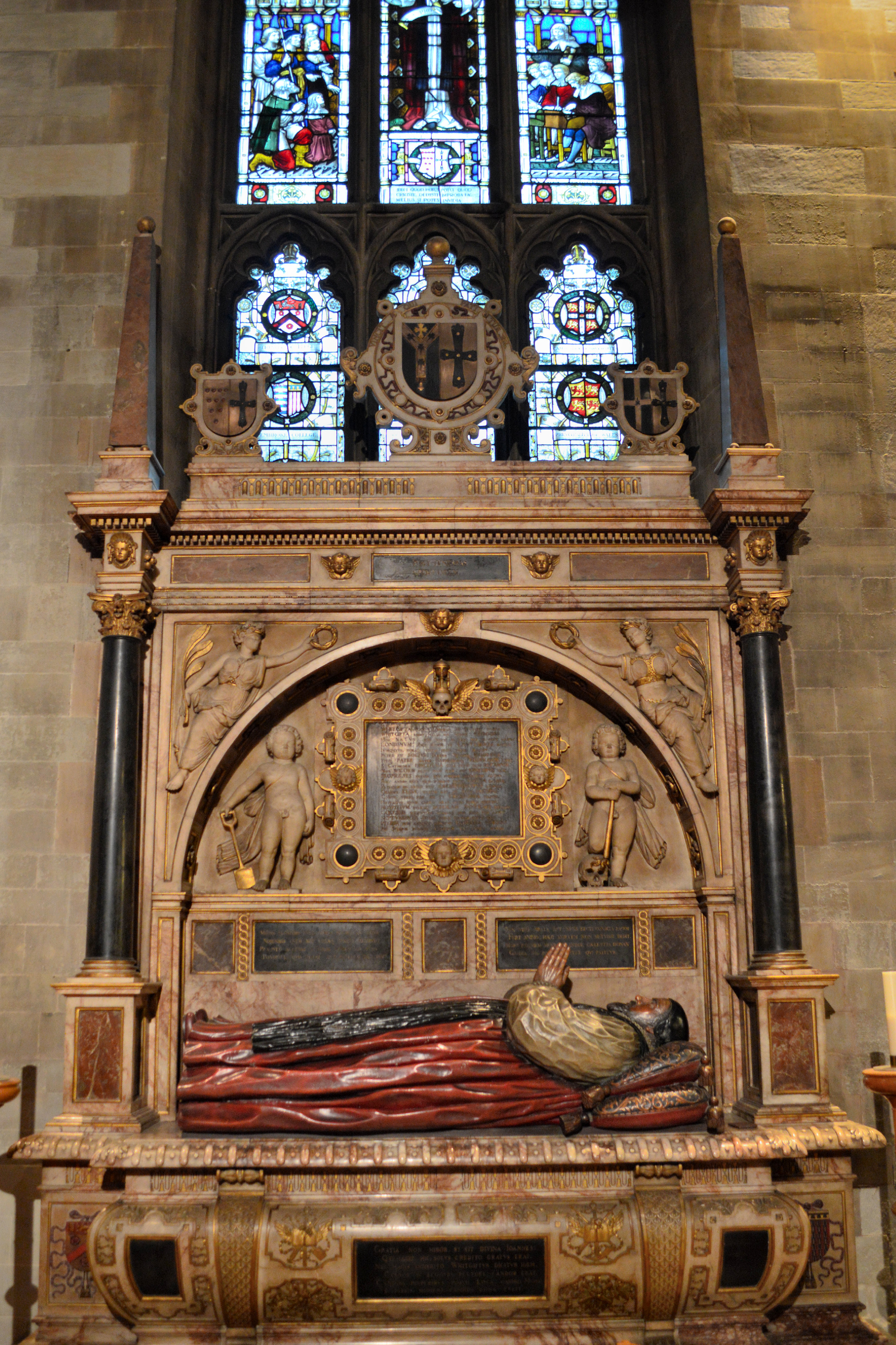
Whitgift monument in Croydon Minster

He died at Lambeth at the end of the following month. He was buried in Croydon at the Parish Church of St John Baptist (now Croydon Minster): his monument there with his recumbent effigy was practically destroyed when the church burnt down in 1867.

== Legacy ==
Whitgift is described by his biographer, Sir George Paule, as of "middle stature, strong and well shaped, of a grave countenance and brown complexion, black hair and eyes, his beard neither long nor thick." He left several unpublished works, included in the Manuscripts Angliae. Many of his letters, articles and injunctions are calendared in the published volumes of the State Papers series of the reign of Elizabeth. His Collected Works, edited for the Parker Society by John Ayre (3 vols., Cambridge, 1851–1853), include the controversial tracts mentioned above, two sermons published during his lifetime, a selection from his letters to Cecil and others, and some portions of his previously unpublished manuscripts.

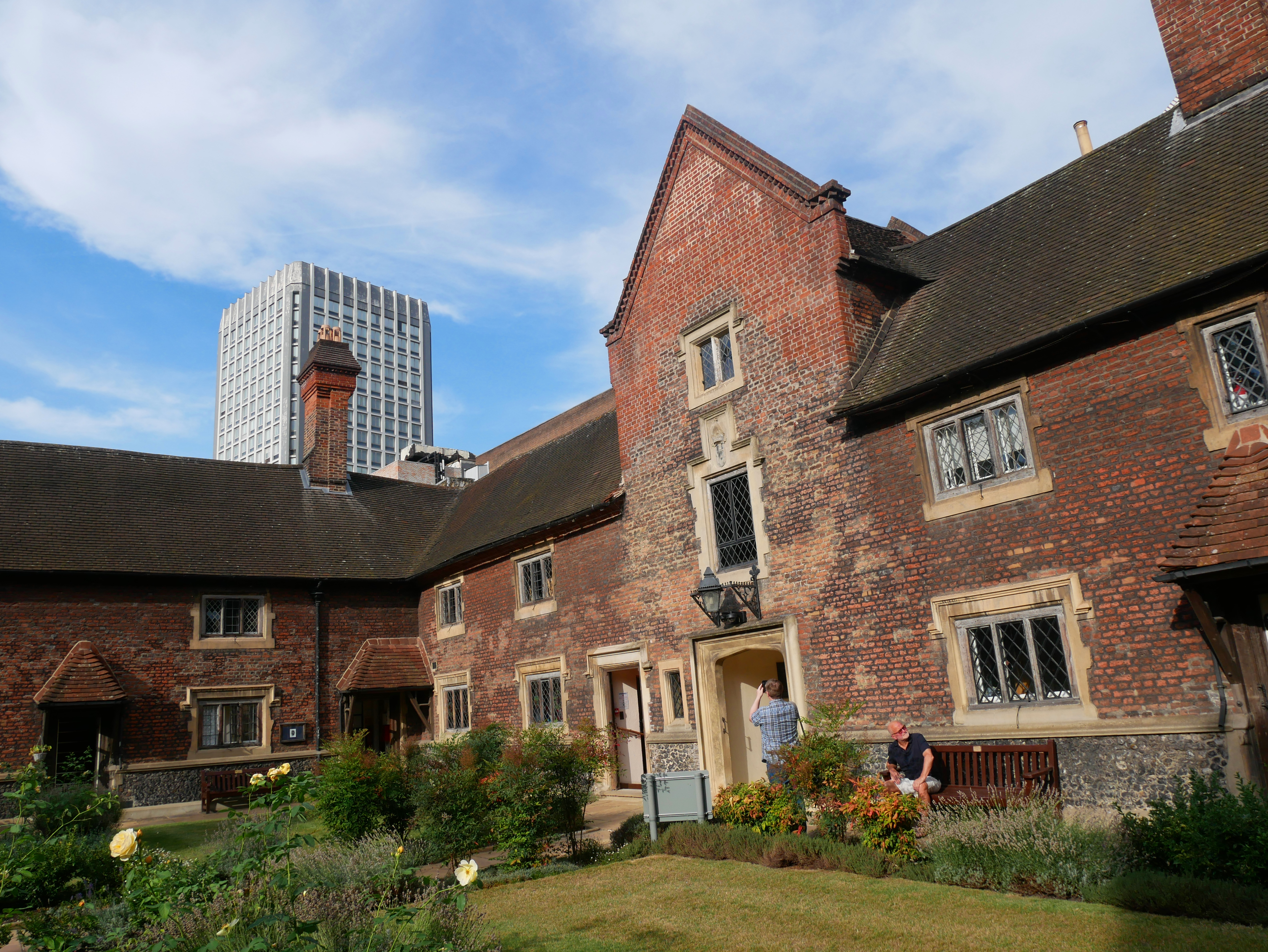
Part of the interior courtyard of the Whitgift Almshouses in Croydon, named for Whitgift

In his later years he concerned himself with various administrative reforms, including fostering learning among the clergy, abolishing non-resident clergy, and reforming the ecclesiastical courts.

Whitgift set up charitable foundations (almshouses), now part of the Whitgift Foundation in Croydon, Surrey, the site of a palace, a summer retreat of Archbishops of Canterbury. It supports homes for the elderly and infirm, and runs three independent schools – Whitgift School, founded in 1596, Trinity School of John Whitgift and, more recently, Old Palace School for girls, which is housed in the former Croydon Palace.

Whitgift Street near Lambeth Palace (the official London residence of the Archbishop of Canterbury) is named after him. Whitgift Close in Laceby in Lincolnshire, where he was Rector of St Margaret's church from 1572 to 1577, is also named for him.

A comprehensive school in his home town of Grimsby, John Whitgift Academy, is named after him.

The Whitgift Centre, a major shopping centre in Croydon, is named after him. It is built on land still owned by the Whitgift Foundation.

== In media ==
Season 7, Episode 6 of the Bad Gays podcast covers his life.

== Arms ==
Coat of arms of John Whitgift

Notes
While serving as a bishop Whitgift's arms would be displayed impaled with the arms of the diocese and topped by a mitre.
Escutcheon
Argent on a cross flory Sable four bezants.

== Sources ==
- Whitgift, John, The Oxford Dictionary of the Christian Church edited by F. L. Cross, (1957).
- Life of Whitgift by Sir George Paule, 1612, 2nd ed. 1649. It was embodied by John Strype in his Life and Acts of Whitgift (1718).
- A life included in Wordsworth's Ecclesiastical Biography (1810)
- W. F. Hook, Archbishops of Canterbury (1875)
- Vol. i. of Whitgift's Collected Works
- C. H. Cooper, Athenae Cantabrigienses.
- The Master of Trinity at Trinity College, Cambridge
- Lee, Sidney (1900). "Whitgift, John" . In Lee, Sidney (ed.). Dictionary of National Biography. Vol. 61. London: Smith, Elder & Co.
- Sheils, William Joseph. "Whitgift, John (1530/31?–1604)". Oxford Dictionary of National Biography (online ed.). Oxford University Press. doi:10.1093/ref:odnb/29311. (Subscription, Wikipedia Library access or UK public library membership required.)

Academic offices
Preceded by Matthew Hutton	Regius Professor of Divinity at Cambridge; 1567–1569	Succeeded by William Chaderton
Preceded by Matthew Hutton	Master of Pembroke College, Cambridge; 1567	Succeeded by John Young
Preceded by Robert Beaumont	Master of Trinity College, Cambridge; 1567–1577	Succeeded by John Still
