= Church of St Margaret, Laceby =

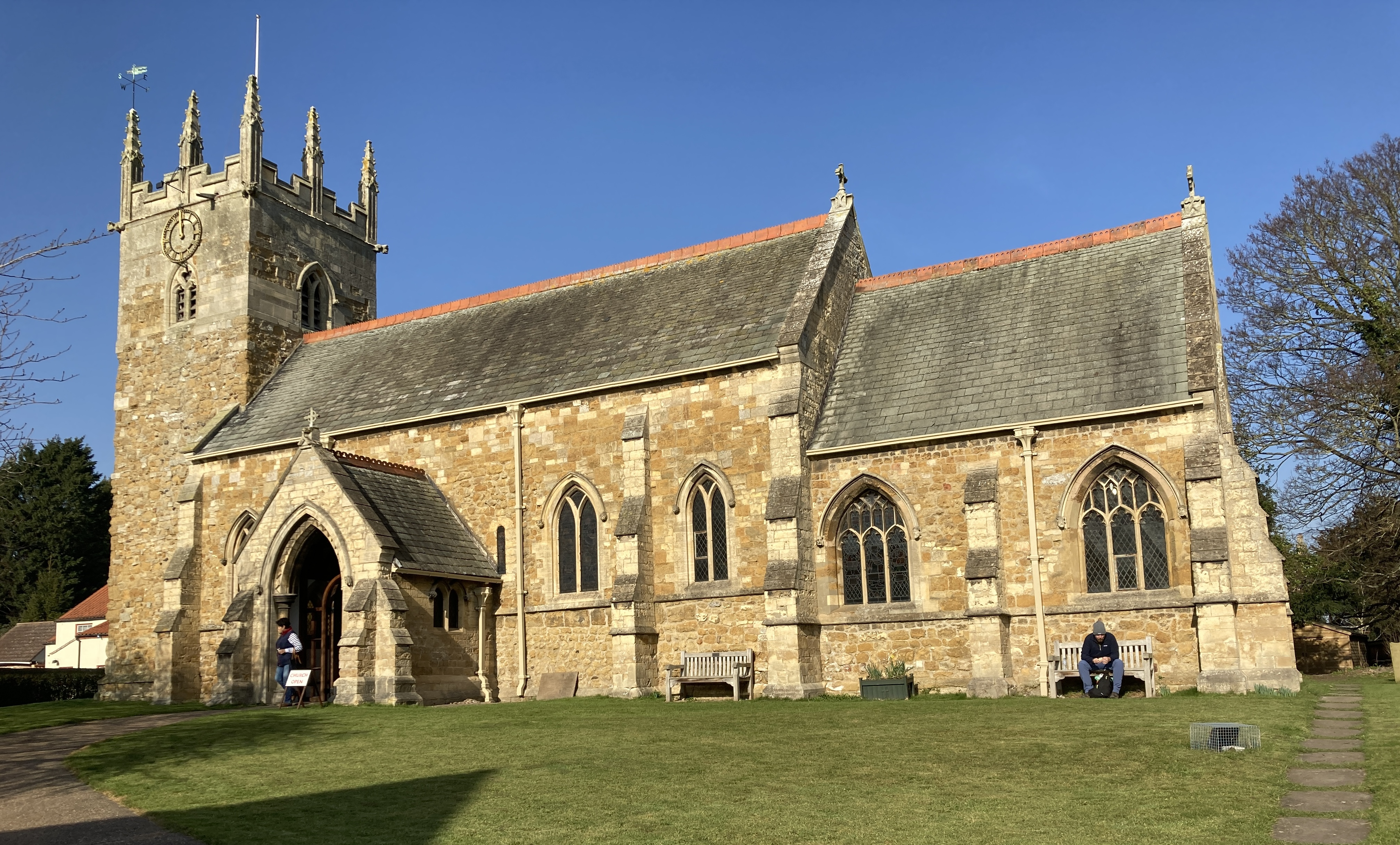
- Church of St Margaret, Laceby
- 53.541375°N 0.16891526°W
- OS grid reference: TA 21437 06530
- Location: Church Lane, Laceby, North East Lincolnshire
- Country: England
- Denomination: Church of England

History
- Status: Church
- Founded: 10th century

Architecture
- Heritage designation: Grade I
- Designated: 1967

The Church of St Margaret is the Anglican Grade I listed parish church for the village of Laceby in Lincolnshire. Listed since 1967 and dedicated to St Margaret of Antioch, it seats today approximately 300 people.

== History and description ==
The church is built of ironstone rubble and squared blocks with some chalk and flint rubble. There are limestone ashlar dressings and facing to the top stage of the tower, which dates to the 14th or 15th century. The lower part of the tower dates to the 10th or early 11th century. Other parts of the church, including the nave also date from the 10th to the 11th century, while the remainder of the arcade dates to the 13th century. The chancel is also 13th-century with the remains of blind arcading of that century and with 14th to 15th-century windows, while the pointed chancel arch is 19th century. Other Norman features include the main doorway arch inside the porch, a fine crenellated arch opposite the main door, separating the nave from the north aisle, and a window opening with more recent glazing dedicated to St Margaret.

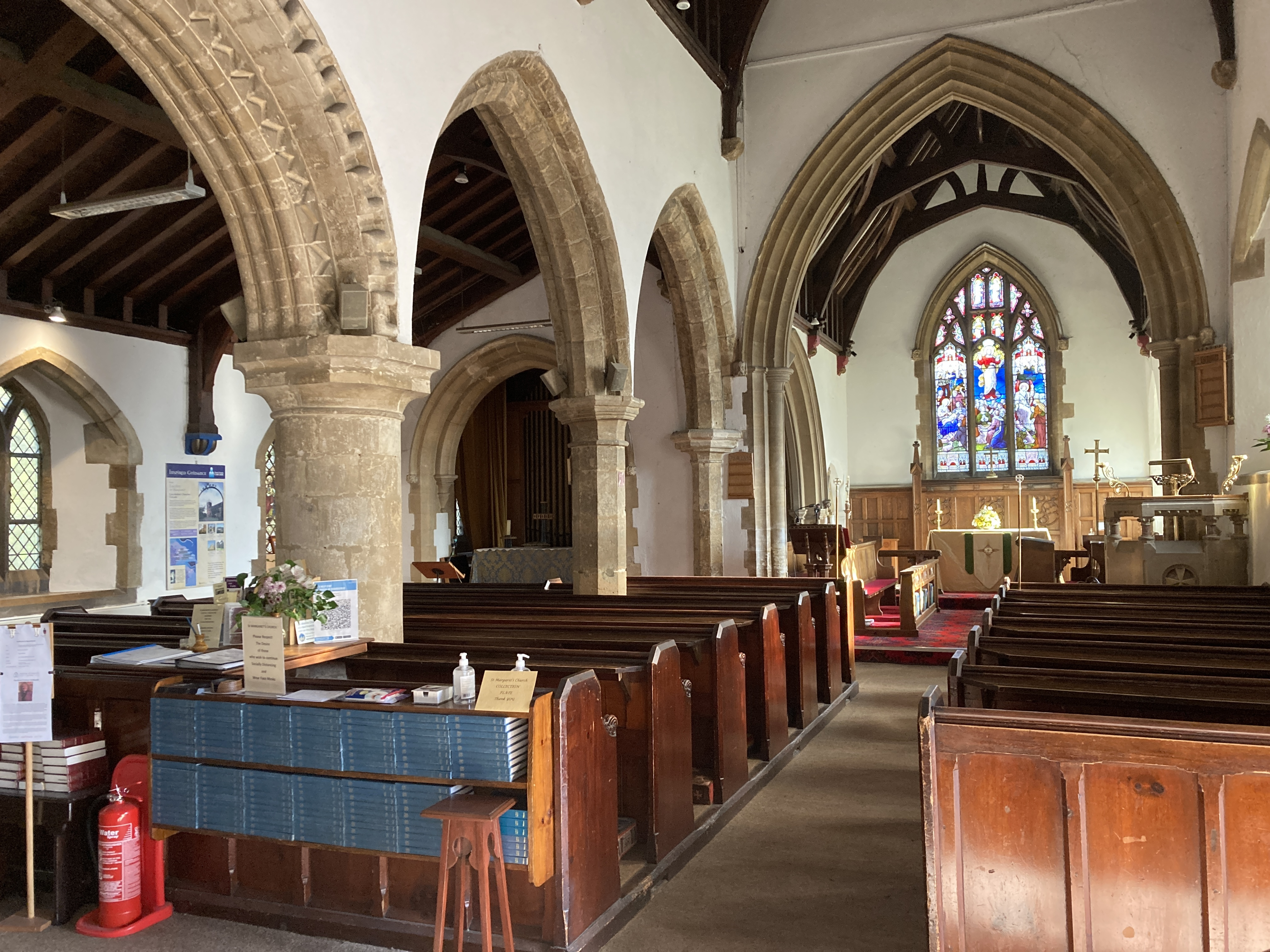
The nave

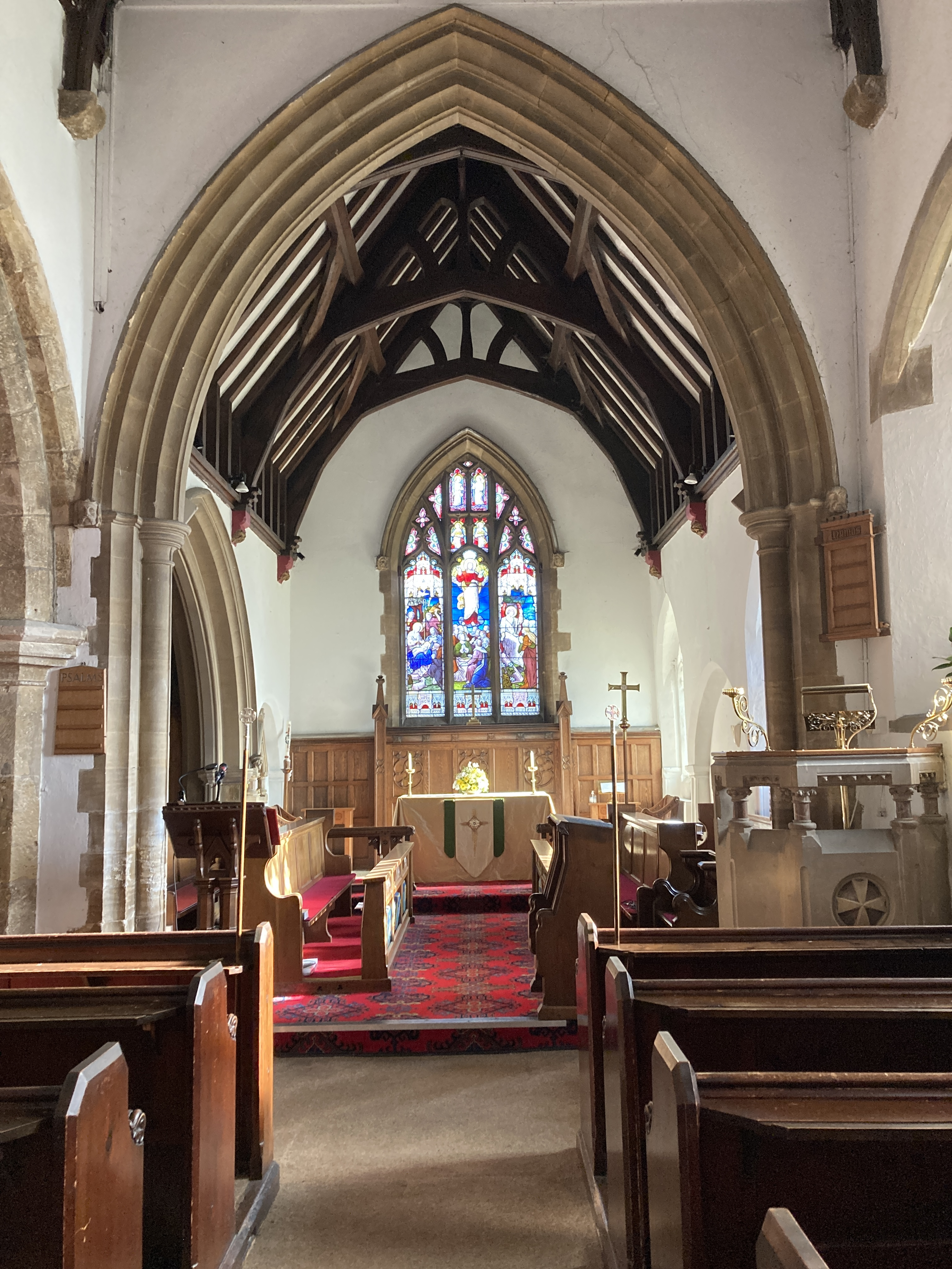
The chancel

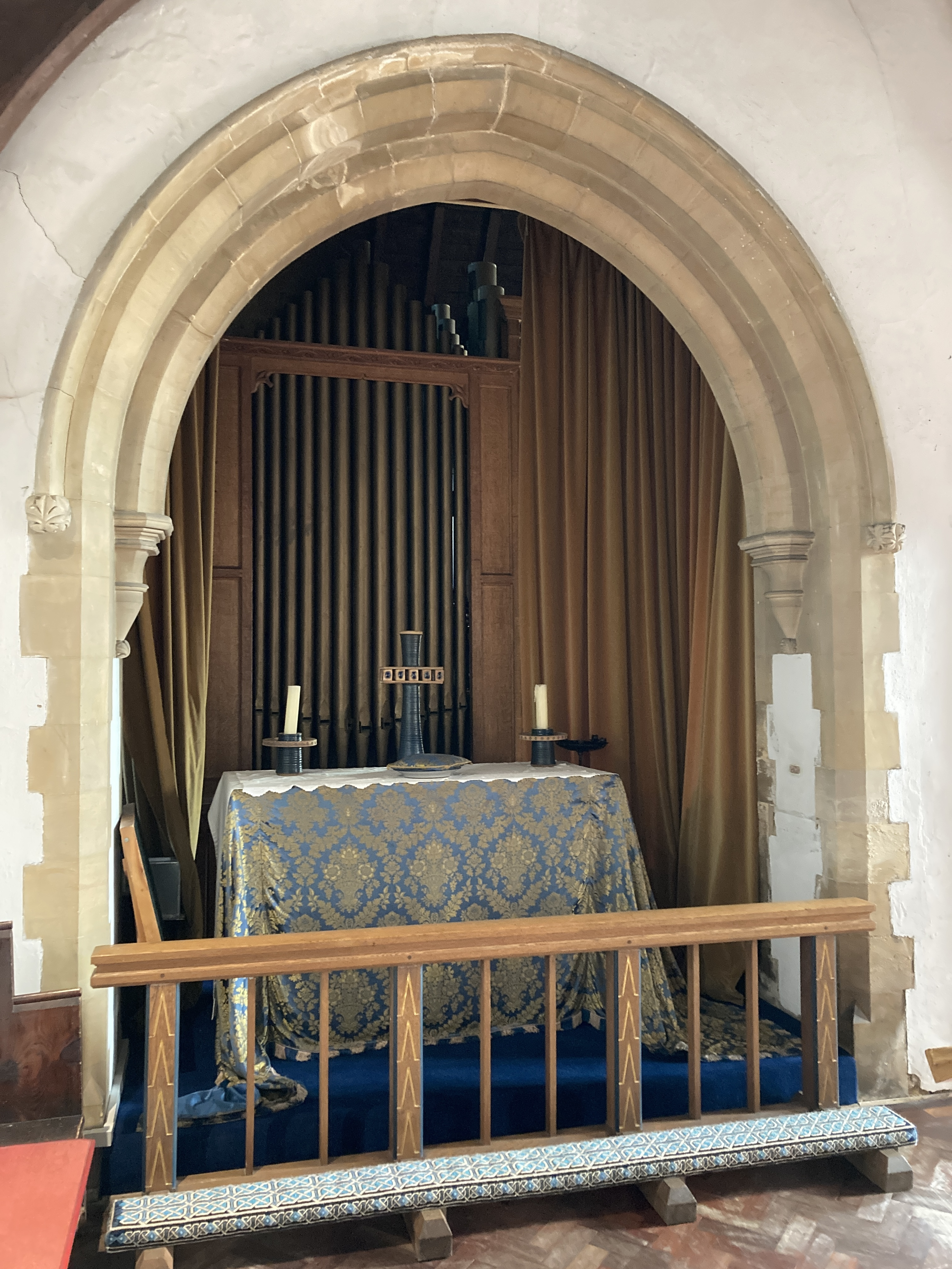
The organ chamber of 1912 with the north aisle altar

Extensive rebuilding and restoration took place in 1869 by James Fowler, architect of Louth. At this time a clerestory at the top of the nave walls was removed and the roof line altered. Construction included the north aisle, chancel and much of the nave, while a new porch and vestry were added. During these restoration grave covers dating to the 10th, or early 11th century, were incorporated into the church's interior. A small, blocked-up, Norman-era window was also found on the east side of the porch. This was restored and stained glass depicting St Margaret of Antioch was installed. A matching window was created on the west side of the porch and installed with a depiction of St. John the Baptist.

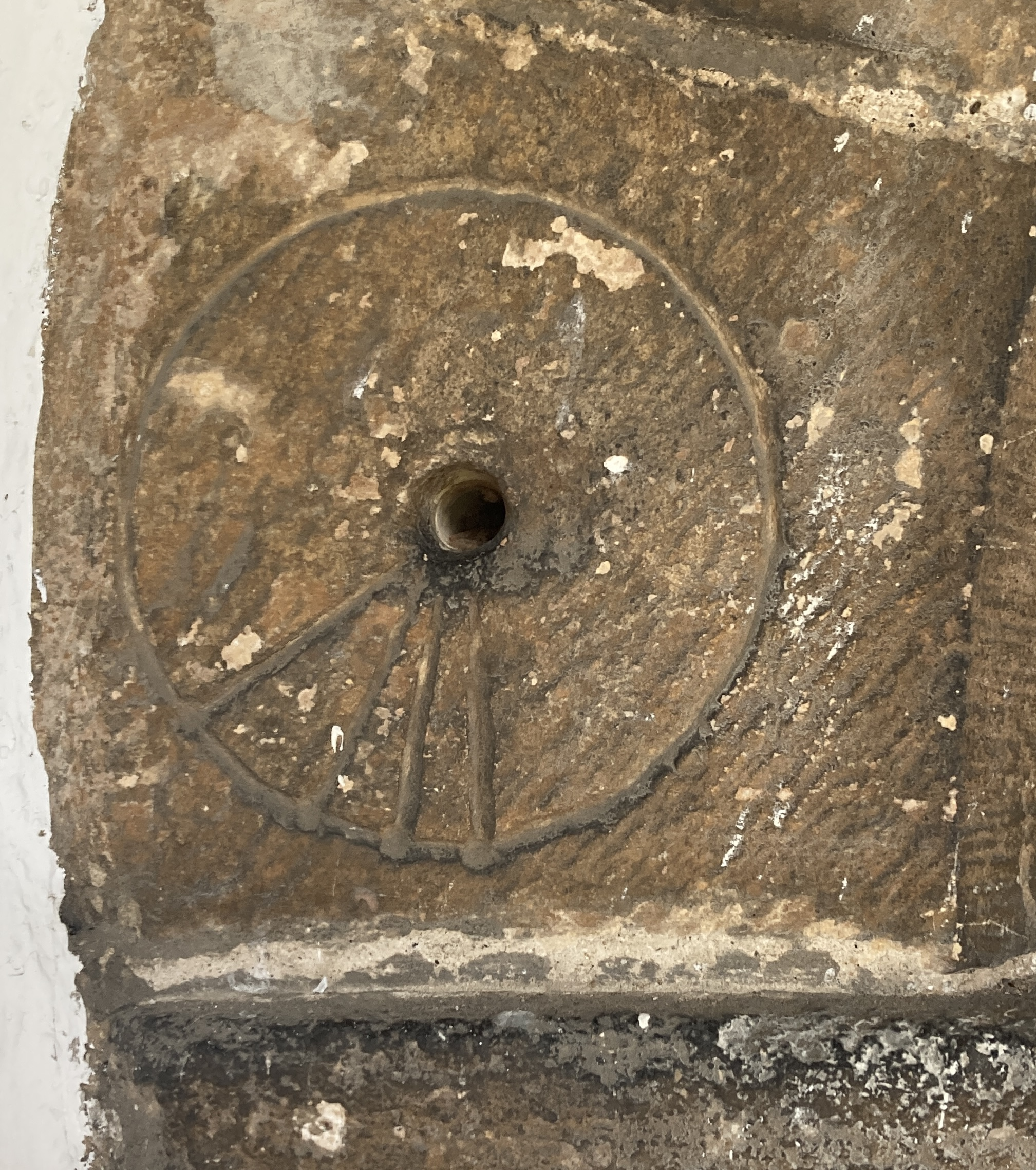
Medieval Mass dial on the Norman arch in the porch

Special services, led by Christopher Wordsworth, the Bishop of Lincoln, were held on 18 May 1870 to commemorate the re-opening of the restored church. An organ-chamber was added in 1912. A medieval mass dial is to be found on the outside of the west pillar of the main doorway.

The 1885 Kelly's Directory describes St. Margaret's as being built from Ancaster stone in Early English and Perpendicular styles, consisting of a chancel, nave, west porch and an embattled tower with pinnacles and four bells. Open benches for seating were added in 1850, and an organ in 1852. A monument to W. Laud (d. 1424) is in the chancel. At the east end of the nave can be found a floor slab to Ralph Ballel of 1730 with an oval panel with his arms and crest carved in relief.

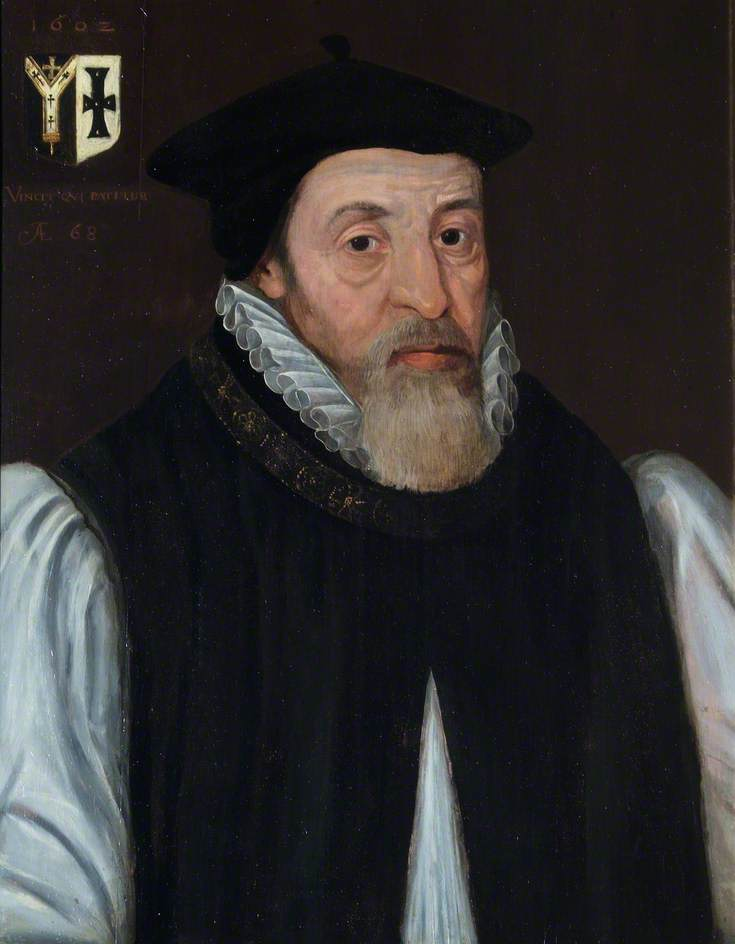
John Whitgift, later Archbishop of Canterbury was Rector at Laceby (1572-1577)

The parish register dates from 1538, with a complete list of parish incumbents from the 12th century – one entry relates to the execution of a witch in 1546. The living was a rectory with 17 acres (0.1 km^{2}) of glebe land. In 1583 John Whitgift, a former St Margaret's rector from 1572 to 1577 who had become Bishop of Worcester, was appointed as Archbishop of Canterbury by Queen Elizabeth I. He had been born in nearby Grimsby in 1530.

St Margaret's is in The Laceby and Ravendale Group of churches, in the Deanery of Haverstoe and the Diocese of Lincoln. With St Margaret's, the Group includes St Andrew's at Irby upon Humber, and St Mary's at Hatcliffe. In 2013 the church held its 124th annual church garden party.

== Stained glass windows ==
These are largely mid-Victorian or later and, where dedicated, commemorate long-serving rectors of the parish. One in the south wall is mid-20th century and is dedicated to Henry Wynyard Knight (1863-1943), long-serving rector at Laceby from 1889 to 1943. Portraits in the window depict the confirmation of Knight to the living at Laceby in the parish church there by Edward King, Bishop of Lincoln. Another in the same window shows John Whitgift being confirmed as Dean of Lincoln in 1571, the year before he was appointed to the living at Laceby.

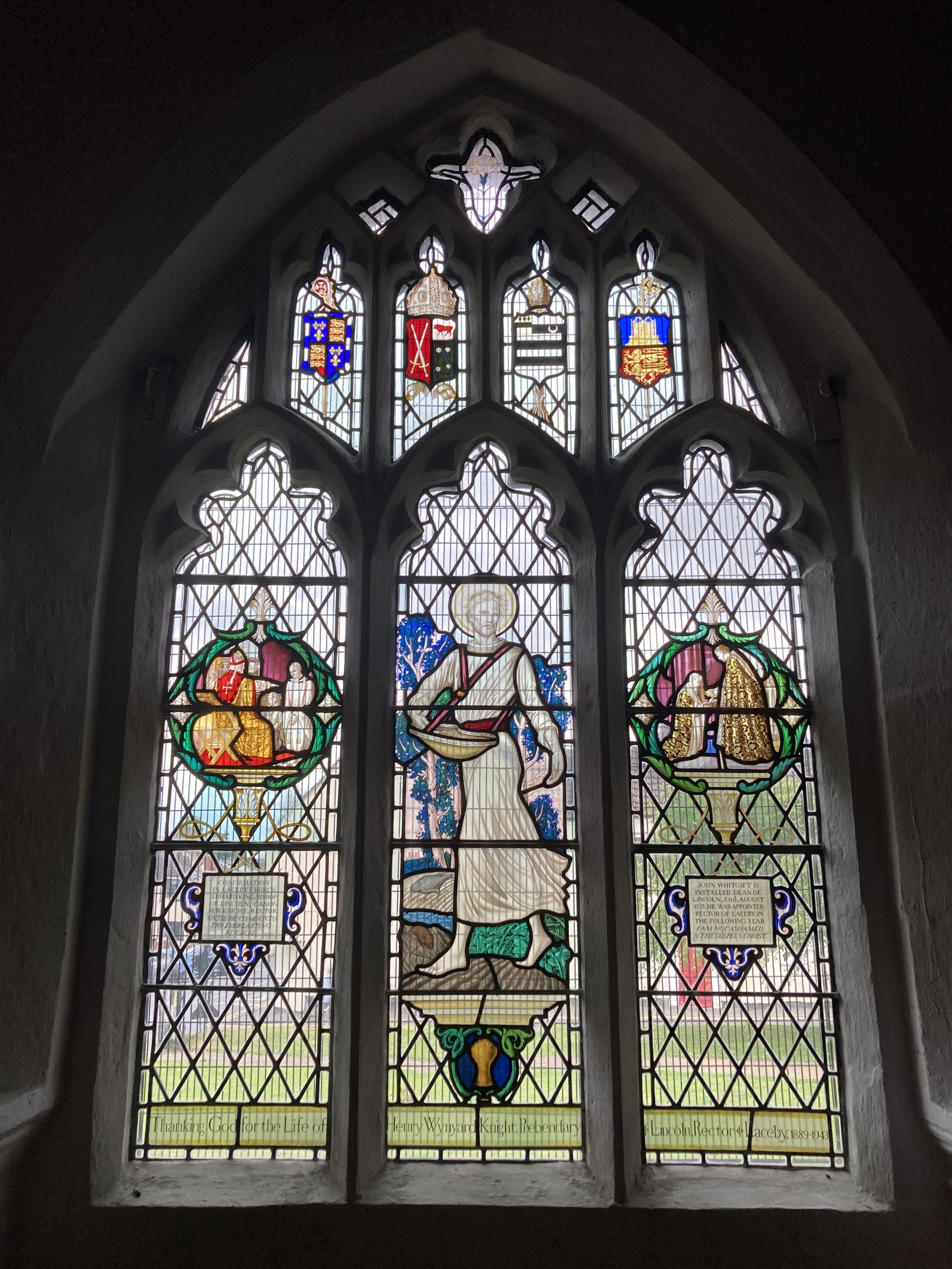
Window in the south wall dedicated to Canon H W Knight

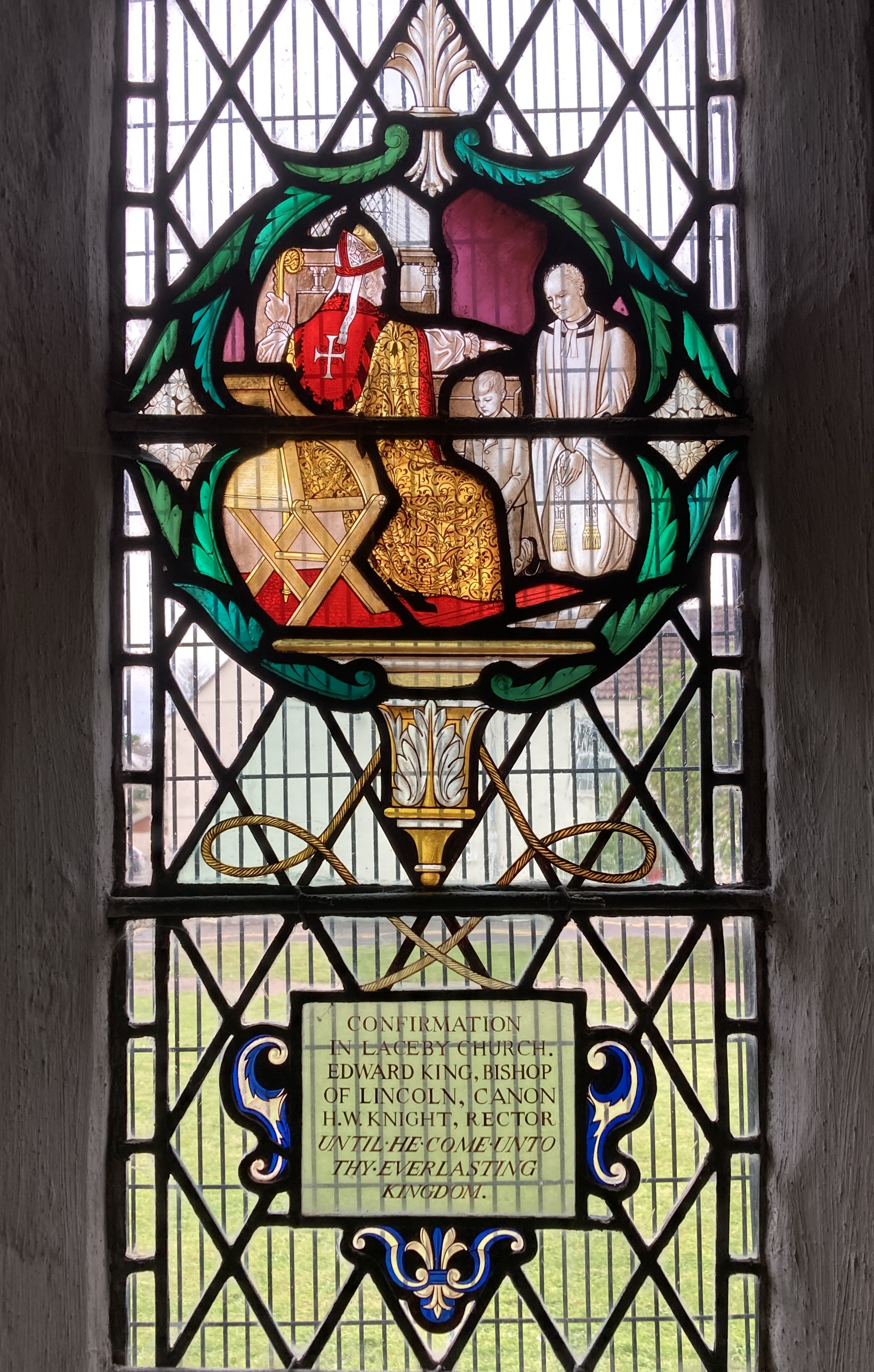
Detail of the Knight window showing the confirmation of H W Knight in 1889

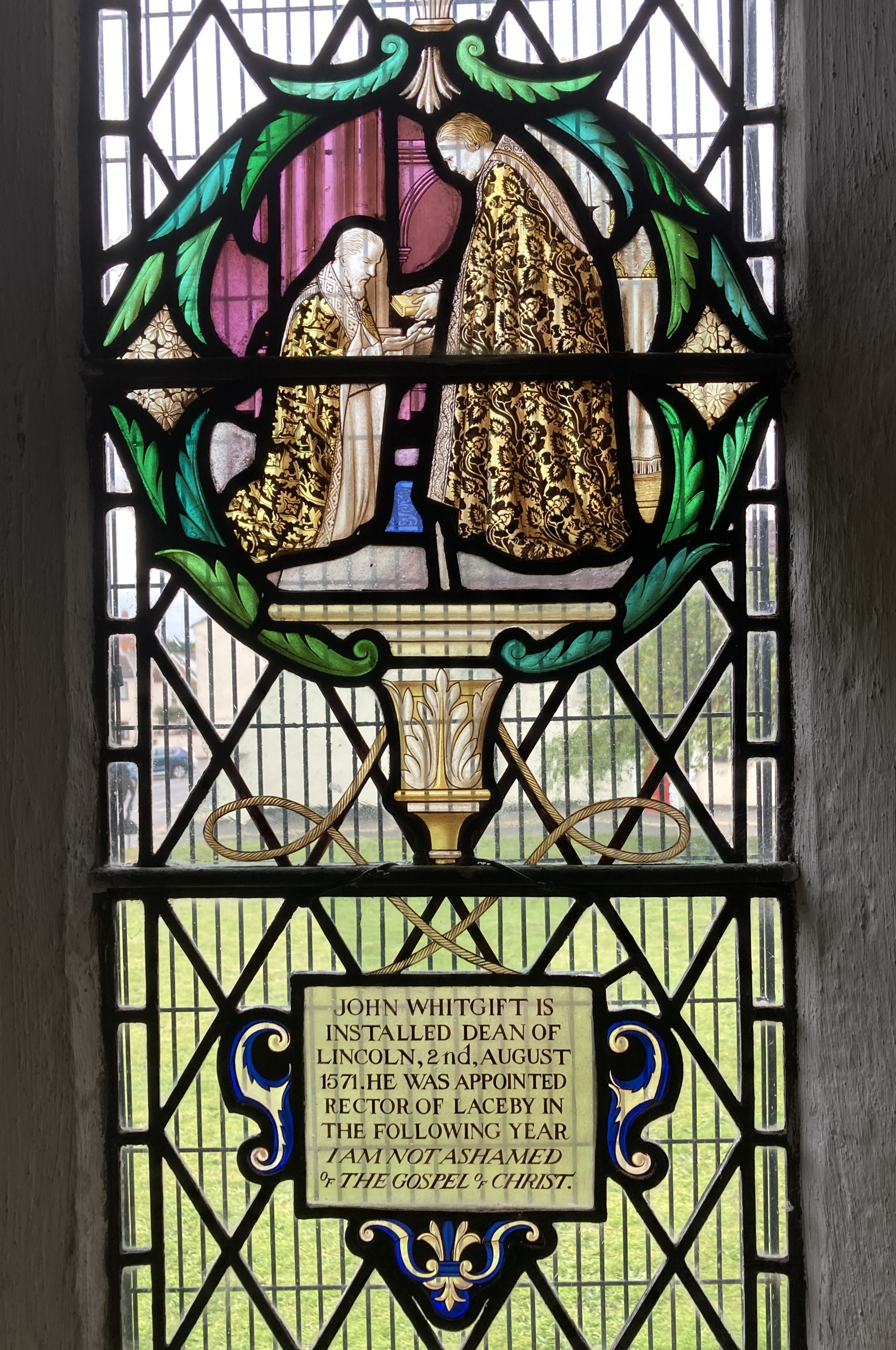
Detail of the Knight window depicting the confirmation of John Whitgift as Dean of Lincoln in 1571

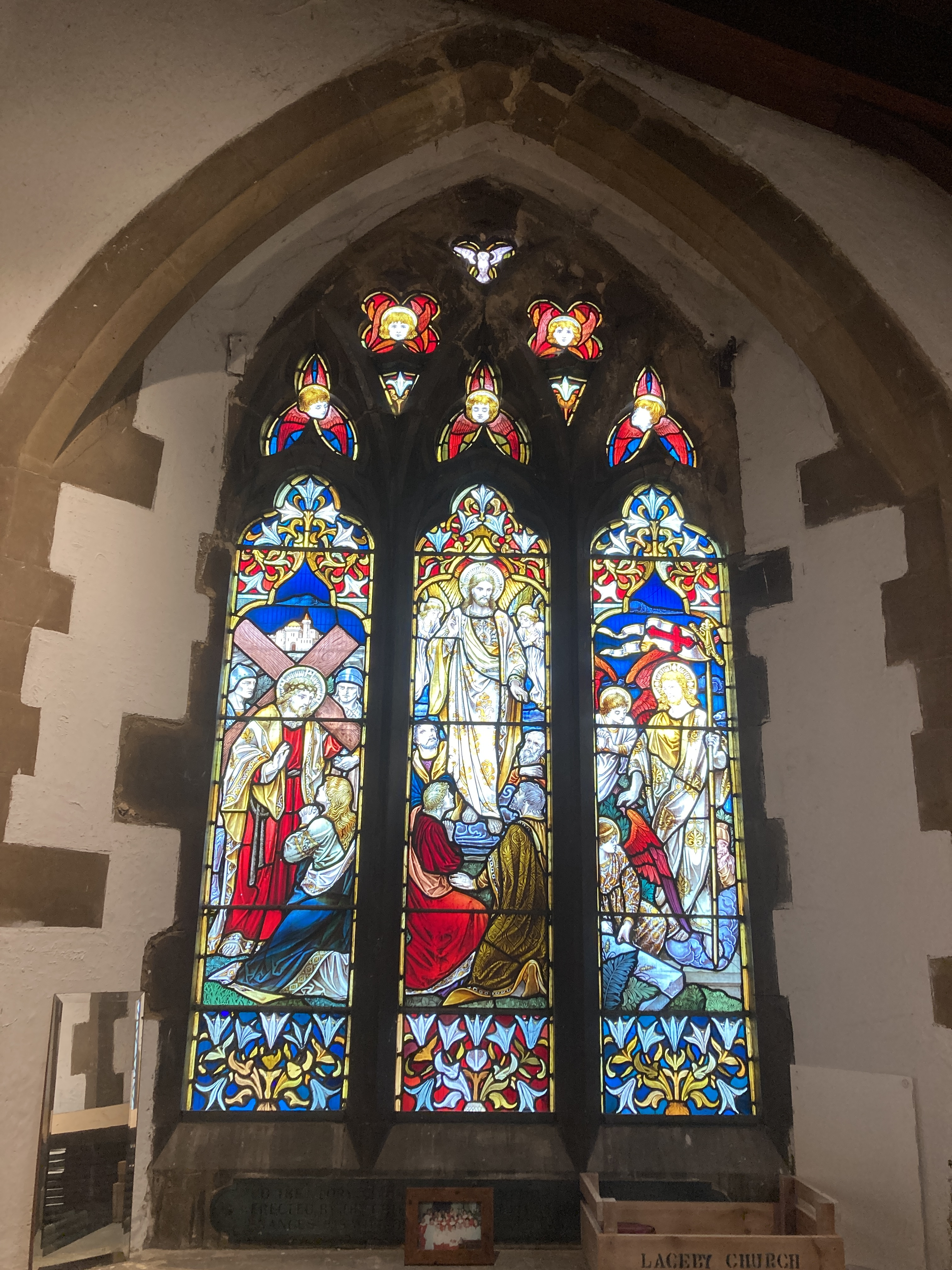
The West window at Laceby church

== Rectors of Laceby ==
- 1179. Walter, Priest of Laceby
- 1219. John, clerk of Geoffrey de Nevill

1234. John de Middenhall

- 1260. Richard Ingeram
- 1261. Thomas de Barneby
- 1270. William Caples
- 1303. Walter de la Linde
- 1511. John de Stretton
- 1363. Simon de Veer
- 1367. John Tredgold
- 1396. Walter de Flynton
- 1426. Hugh de Flynton
- 1448. Robert Cawell
- 1490. Richard Butler
- 1527. William Skerne
- 1545. Roger Dalyson
- 1571. Thomas Stonynge
- 1572. John Whitgift, D.D., Archbishop of Canterbury
- 1577. Willam Bradley
- 1591. John Clark
- 1606. Thomas Rishworth
- 1632. Thomas Codd
- 1666. Stephen Boynton
- 1667. William Potter
- 1670. Lionel Catford
- 1671. William Poplewell
- 1679. Nicholas Sye
- 1682. Anthony Smythe
- 1686. Robert Janney
- 1696. Henry Champant
- 1727. John Clark
- 1768. John Beatnisse
- 1769. Jonathan Winship
- 1785. Thomas Dixon
- 1832. John Birkett
- 1849. William H. Hutchinson
- 1862. Edmund H. Knight
- 1889. Henry W. Knight
- 1944. Willoughby R. K. Robinison
- 1955. Lionel W. R. Bacon
- 1960. Clifford M. A. Dawson
- 1968. Sam Riley
- 1978. John E. Bassett
- 1983. Roger J. Ryan
- 1989. William Davison Caretaker Priest
- 1990 A. John Adamson
- 2005 Peter. M. Tompkins
- 2014 Philip T. Stevens MBE
