= Beelsby =

Village in North East Lincolnshire, England

Coordinates: 53.501175°N 0.179554°W

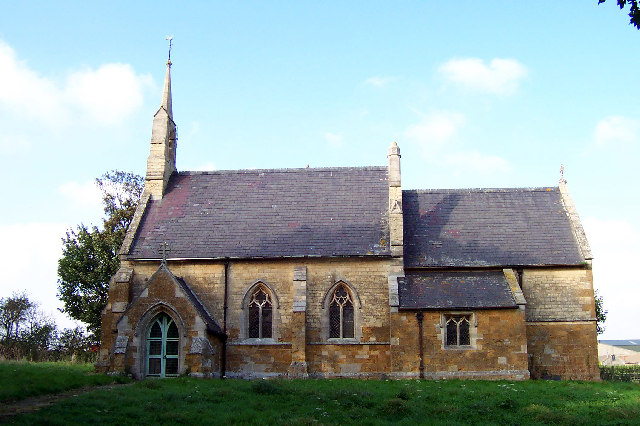
- Church of St Andrew, Beelsby

- Location within Lincolnshire
- Population: 119 (2011)
- OS grid reference: TA208020
  - London: 140 mi (230 km) S
- Unitary authority: North East Lincolnshire
- Ceremonial county: Lincolnshire
- Region: Yorkshire and the Humber
- Country: England
- Sovereign state: United Kingdom
- Post town: GRIMSBY
- Postcode district: DN37
- Dialling code: 01472
- Police: Humberside
- Fire: Humberside
- Ambulance: East Midlands
- UK Parliament: Brigg and Immingham

Beelsby is a village in North East Lincolnshire, England. The village is situated approximately 6 miles (10 km) south-west from Grimsby.

Beelsby population at the 2001 Census was 114, increasing to 119 at the 2011 census.

The village is the source for the River Freshney.

The Grade II listed parish church is dedicated to St. Andrew.

In 1986 agriculture was centred on two farms: one run by the Beelsby Farming Company, the other by Fenwick Brothers, and both owned by members of the same family.
