= Laceby =

Village and civil parish in North East Lincolnshire, England

Coordinates: 53°32′30″N 0°10′11″W

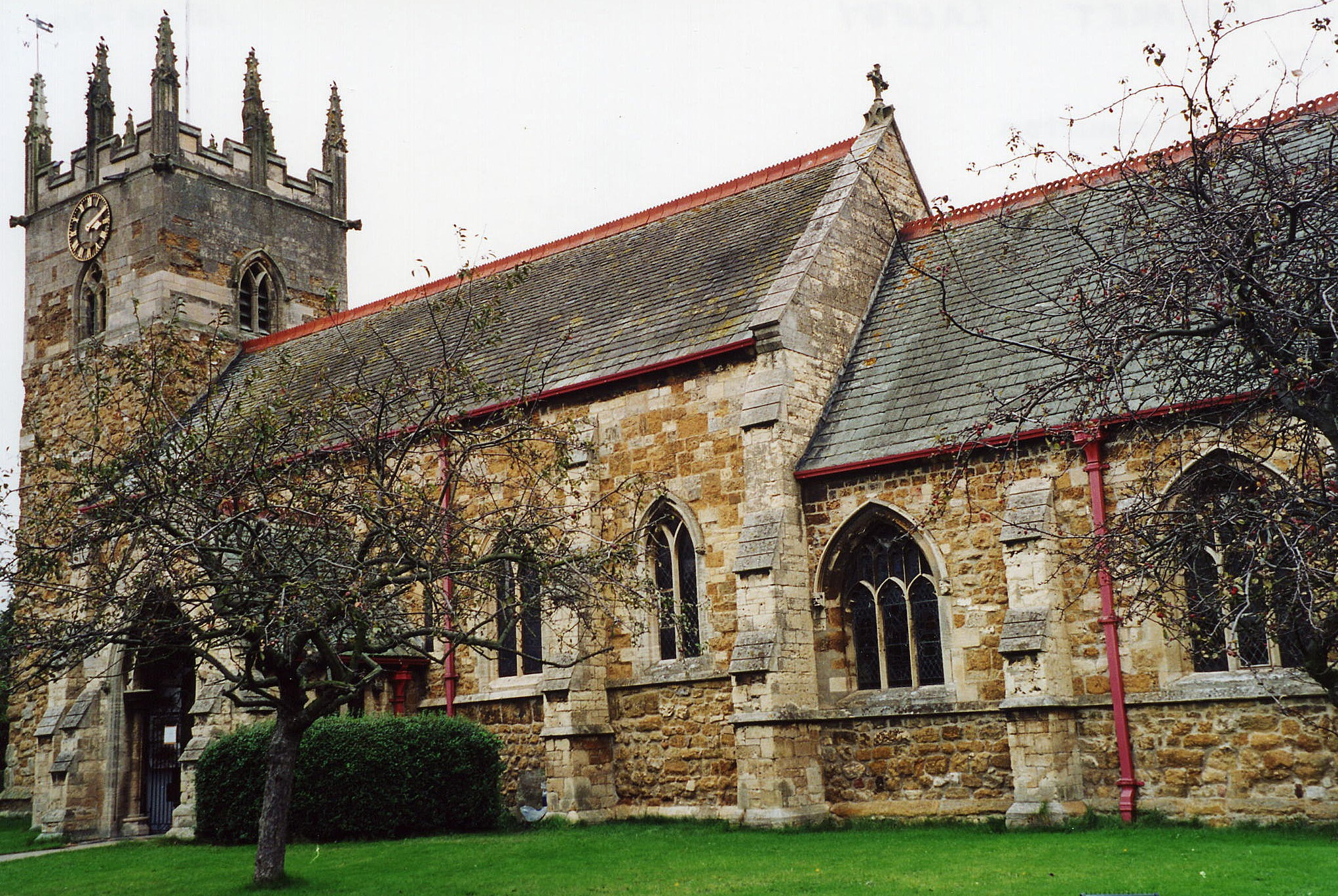
- St Margaret's Church

- Location within Lincolnshire
- Population: 3,259 (2011)
- OS grid reference: TA279087
  - London: 145 mi (233 km) S
- Unitary authority: North East Lincolnshire
- Ceremonial county: Lincolnshire
- Region: Yorkshire and the Humber
- Country: England
- Sovereign state: United Kingdom
- Post town: GRIMSBY
- Postcode district: DN37
- Dialling code: 01472
- Police: Humberside
- Fire: Humberside
- Ambulance: East Midlands
- UK Parliament: Brigg and Immingham

Laceby is a village and civil parish in North East Lincolnshire, England. It is situated on the A46 road, just outside the western boundary of Grimsby. Laceby's population at the 2001 Census was 2,886, increasing to 3,259 at the 2011 Census. The village is noted for its parish church of St Margaret's, parts of which date to the 12th century.

== History ==
A Mesolithic flint working site to the north-east of the village, found in 1958, included examples of Neolithic leaf-shaped arrowheads, while a "findspot of possible Anglo-Saxon pottery" was discovered in Cooper Lane in 1969. Nearby Welbeck Hill is the site of Roman pottery finds, and an Anglo-Saxon cemetery.

According to A Dictionary of British Place Names, Laceby could derive from "a farmstead or village of a man called Leifr", 'Leifr' being an Old Scandinavian person name, and 'by', a farmstead, village or settlement.

Laceby is listed in the Domesday Book of 1086 as "Lenesbi" or "Levesbi", in the Bradley Hundred of the North Riding of Lindsey. The village contained 33 households, 4 villagers, 5 smallholders, 85 freemen and 3 priests. It comprised 16 ploughlands, a meadow of 360 acres (1.5 km^{2}), woodland of 100 acres (0.4 km^{2}), and 2 mills. The three Lords in 1066 were Erik, Tosti and Swein. In 1086 the land was passed to Bishop Odo of Bayeux, as Lord of the manor and Tenant-in-chief.

On 26 December 1234, Henry III granted John, son of Geoffrey de Nevill, the right to hold a fair, on 20 July, the feast day of St Margaret of Antioch, at Laceby Manor.

In April 1268, John de la Linde (or Launde), seneschal of the city of London, bought his father-in-law, Hugh de Neville's debts of £10. 16s. owed to Henry III, and £28 owed a money lender, Manasser of Brodsworth. In return, he received 'the right to the demesnes, homages, services, villeinages, the advowson of the church, the woods, the meadows, the pastures, the mills, the gardens as well as all other things' belonging to Laceby manor.

In the 13th century, John's son, Walter de la Laund (or Launde), Lord of the manor of Laceby, married Cecilia, daughter of Jordan de Essheby (or Ashby). After the death of her brother, Cecilia was the sole heir to her father, and inherited his manor, which became known as Ashby de la Launde.

In 1314/15, Walter divided Laceby manor, and the advowson of the church between his daughters Joan and Cecilia, and their respective husbands, John de Dallyngregge, and Herbert de Flynton. He retained the bailiwick of West Perrot and the manor of Broomfield, Somerset.

In a talk given to a meeting of the Lincoln Diocesan Architectural Society, held at Grimsby in 1859, Edward Trollope, discussed the disagreements between Grimsby and Laceby over the payment of port and road tolls and described Walter as that 'local tyrant', adding "I scarcely dare to mention his name even now," which drew laughter from the audience.

=== 1800s ===
In the 1830s, during a period of low wages, protests against Irish agricultural workers broke out in Lincolnshire. In the Laceby area it was the farmers themselves who were targeted: 'if you do not raise [workers] wages, you must suffer by consequence' read one written warning from the time.

In 1834, the village had two principal residences; Laceby Hall, 'on the lofty summit of a hill', occupied by H. C. Oxendon, and Laceby Manor house, occupied by P. Skipworth.

In 1885 Kelly's Directory describes Laceby as a "well-built village" in the Parliamentary borough of Great Grimsby, with an 1881 population of 1,017. The parish area was 2,063 acres (8.3 km^{2}), in which was grown chiefly wheat, oats, barley and turnips. Commercial occupations included five farmers, three of whom pursued other trades as butcher, cattle dealer, or miller. There were three market gardeners, two butchers, one of whom was a cattle dealer, two shoe makers, two grocer & drapers, two carriers, a blacksmith, wheelwright, saddler, beer retailer, baker, miller, flour dealer, coal dealer, tailor, builder, joiner, carpenter, a machinist & steam thrashing machine proprietor, a publican at the Waterloo Inn public house, and a bailiff to one of the major landowners. The sub-postmaster was also a pharmaceutical chemist and insurance agent. The village contained a post office and Stanford's Charity School.

=== 1900s ===
In 1933 Kelly's noted an increase of parish land to 2,122 acres (9 km^{2}), and a 1921 population of 1,120. Further observations not included in 1885 were a Temperance Hall, built in 1872 for 250 people, and a cemetery of 1 1/2 acres (0.01 km^{2}), formed in 1875, in the control of the Parish Council. There was now a Laceby Sanatorium, and a Laceby Reading Club. Buses now linked the village to Grimsby, Caistor, and Scunthorpe. 1933 commercial occupations included four farmers, four market gardeners, a smallholder, two builders, three shopkeepers, a butcher, baker, saddler, blacksmith, beer retailer, boot maker, carrier, a carpenter & joiners, and the publican at the Waterloo Inn. The post master's duel trade, previously a chemist, was now a grocer. Trades existing that did not exist in 1885 were a cycle dealer & agent, a confectioner, hair dresser, fried fish dealer, motor engineer, fruiterer and a seed agent. There was also a dairy, and agricultural engineers.

== Places of Worship ==
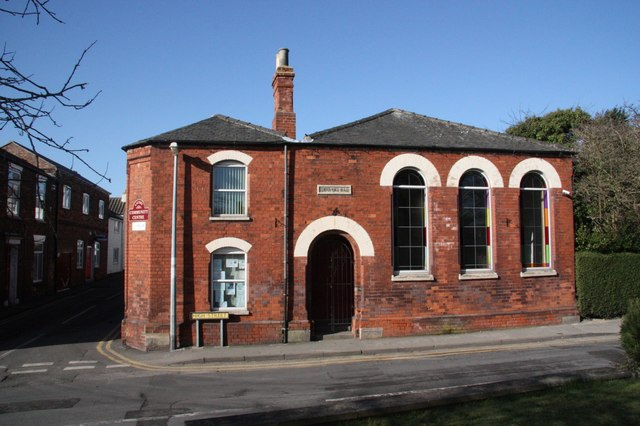
Temperance Hall, Laceby.

Laceby Anglican Grade I listed parish church of St Margaret is dedicated to St Margaret of Antioch. It seats today approximately 300 people. Parts of the church, including the nave, and north arcade, date to the 12th century. During restoration works in the late 1800s grave covers dating to the 10th, or early 11th century, were incorporated into the church's interior. A small, blocked-up, Norman era window was also found on the east side of the porch. This was restored and stained glass depicting St. Margaret was installed. A matching window was created on the west side of the porch and installed with a depiction of St. John the Baptist. Special services, led by Christopher Wordsworth, the Bishop of Lincoln, were held on 18 May 1870 to commemorate the re-opening of the restored church.

The 1885 Kelly's Directory describes St. Margaret's as being built from Ancaster stone in Early English and Perpendicular styles, consisting of a chancel, nave, west porch and an embattled tower with pinnacles and four bells. Open benches for seating were added in 1850, and an organ in 1852. A monument to W. Laud (d. 1424) is in the chancel. The church was restored in 1869 by James Fowler, architect of Louth. In 1583 John Whitgift, a former St Margaret's rector who had become Bishop of Worcester, was appointed as Archbishop of Canterbury by Queen Elizabeth I. He had been born in nearby Grimsby in 1530. The parish register dates from 1538, with a complete list of parish incumbents from the 12th century – one entry relates to the execution of a witch in 1546. The living was a rectory with 17 acres (0.1 km^{2}) of glebe land.

St Margaret's is in The Laceby and Ravendale Group of churches, in the Deanery of Haverstoe and the Diocese of Lincoln. With St Margaret's, the Group includes St Andrew's at Irby upon Humber, and St Mary's at Hatcliffe. In 2013 the church held its 124th annual church garden party.

In 1885, two chapels within the village: one Wesleyan, built in 1853 and seating 300, the other Primitive Methodist, built in 1837. A further Primitive Methodist chapel, built in 1861 and called Irby Chapel, was close to the parish boundary with Irby upon Humber.

== Geography ==
The A18 road previously ran through the village.

A contract of £357,302 was given for the A18 bypass in August 1961, to be finished November 1962. Clugston of Scunthorpe built the bypass. Work on the bypass was started on Monday 9 October 1961 by Sir Weston Cracroft-Amcotts, the chairman of Lindsey County Council. It was the first large road scheme in Lindsey for 30 years. The bypass opened at the end of November 1962.

== Community ==
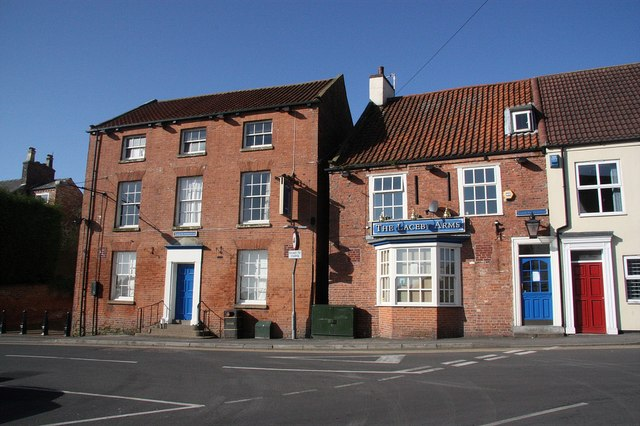
Laceby village centre.

The Stanford's Charity School was founded in 1730 by the Stanford Trust which had been set up in 1720 by Sarah Stanford in accordance with her husband Philip Stanford's will of 1712. The school originally served the parishes of Laceby, Bradley and Barnoldby le Beck. Stanford's endowment at the time comprised a house, a farmhouse, and 74 acres (0.3 km^{2}) of land.

Laceby's public house the Waterloo Inn and the Nags Head Inn, which were noted in the Guinness Book of Records as the two closest pubs in England. They were combined into one pub in 1990. After a period of closure it re-opened on 22 March 2009 under a new landlord. Both sides of the pub are now closed.

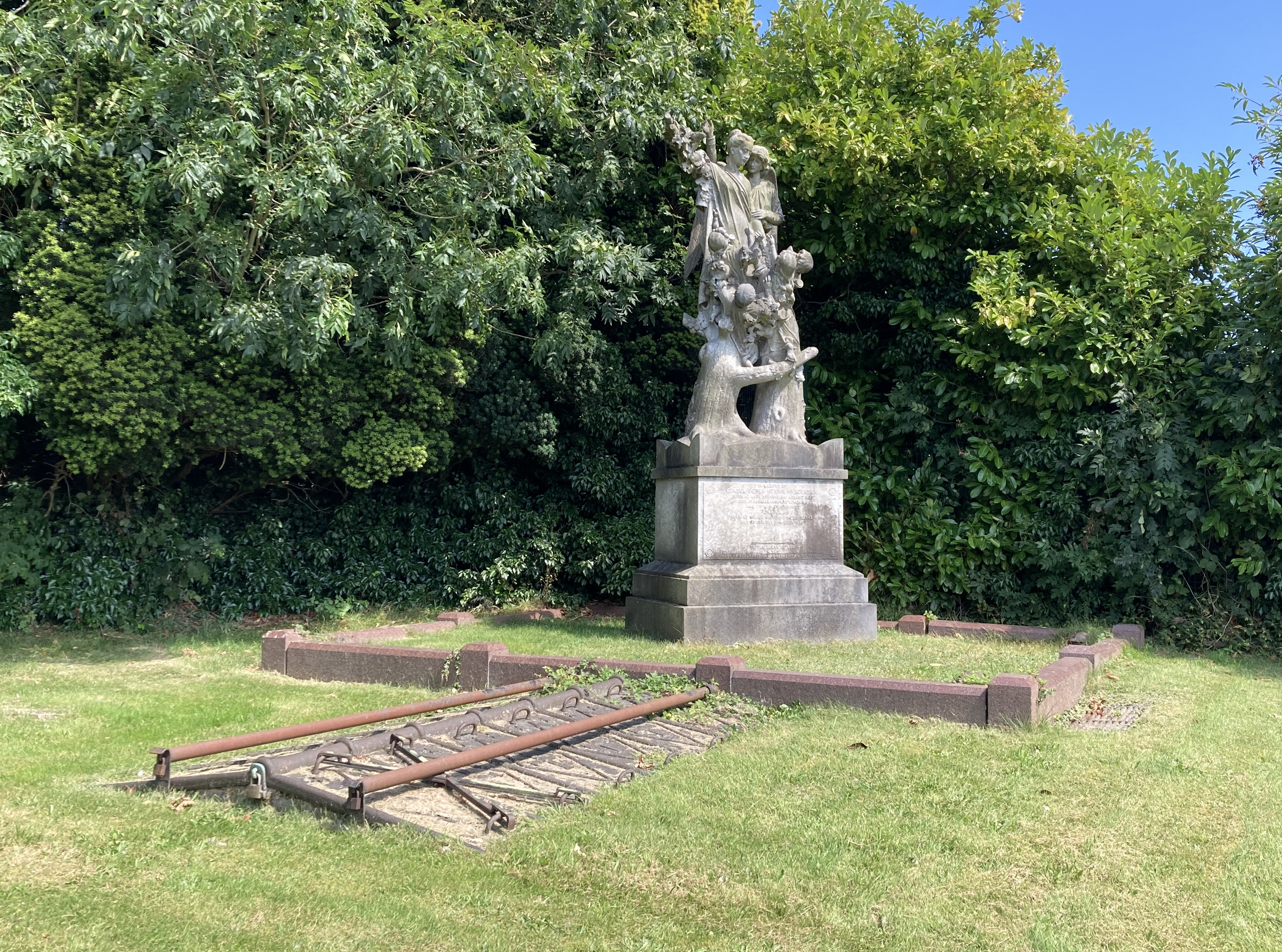
The Haagensen Memorial and Vault in Laceby Cemetery

The village has one primary school: Stanford Junior & Infants School, founded in 1730 by the Stanford Trust which was set up by Sarah Stanford in accordance with her husband Phillip Stanford's will.

The Grimsby Institute has its Laceby Manor Golf Club to the south of the village. A Morrisons supermarket lies within the Laceby parish.

Laceby Cemetery, owned and maintained by the parish council, is notable for the Grade II listed Haagensen Memorial and Vault in its grounds which was erected in 1897.
