= Lincoln power stations =

Power generator that provided power for the Town of Lincoln

- Country: United Kingdom
- Location: Lincoln
- Coordinates: 53°13′40.4″N 00°31′25.5″W
- Status: Decommissioned and demolished
- Construction began: 1898
- Commission date: 1898, 1917, 1920, 1947
- Decommission date: 1917, 1953, 1977
- Owners: Lincoln Corporation (1898–1948); British Electricity Authority (1948–1955); Central Electricity Authority (1955–1957); Central Electricity Generating Board (1958–1977)
- Operator: As owner

Thermal power station
- Primary fuel: Coal
- Chimneys: 2
- Cooling towers: 6
- Cooling source: River water plus cooling towers

Power generation
- Units operational: 4 × Brush-Ljungstrom 20 MW
- Nameplate capacity: 80 MW
- Annual net output: 230.309 GWh (1962)

Lincoln power stations were a sequence of electricity generating stations that provided electric power to the City of Lincoln and the wider area between 1898 and 1977. The first station was built by Lincoln Corporation in 1898 on Brayford Wharf. During the First World War the engineering company Clayton and Shuttleworth built a power station in Spa Road to meet its own electricity needs. This private station was bought by Lincoln Corporation in 1918 and was expanded to meet rising demand and supplied electricity until it was demolished in 1953. A final power station was built on the Spa Road site over the period 1947–57 and operated until it was decommissioned in 1977.

== Background ==
The Corporation of Lincoln applied for, and was granted by the Board of Trade, a provisional electric lighting order to generate and supply electricity to the City of Lincoln in 1897. The Lincoln Electric Lighting Order 1897 was ratified by Parliament in the Electric Lighting Order Confirmation (No. 2) Act 1897 (60 & 61 Vict. c. lxii).

== Brayford power station, 1898–1917 ==
The first electricity generating station was built in 1898 by the Lincoln Corporation. It was located on Brayford Wharf North; this provided access to local waterways for the delivery of coal and the disposal of ash by barge, and also provided a source of water for the station's condensing plant. Brayford Pool is connected to the River Trent via the Fossdyke Navigation to the west and to the River Witham to the south. The station had a boiler house and an engine house and at opening contained three Willans central valve high-speed engines. direct-coupled to 50 kW continuous-current two-pole dynamos built by Messrs. Laurence Scott and Co of Norwich. Steam was provide from two Ruston, Proctor & Co. Before the station had been fully completed additional plant was on order.

At this juncture the station contained the following plant:

- 5 × economic boilers operating at 125 psi (8.6 bar) (saturated)
- 1 × Climax boiler operating at 200 psi (13.8 bar) (superheated)
- 1 × Babcock & Wilcox 6,000 pounds per hour (0.756 kg/s) boiler, operating at 200 psi (13.8 bar) (superheated)
- 2 × Howden 15,000 and 20,000 pounds per hour (1.89 kg/s and 2.52 kg/s) boilers, operating at 200 psi (13.8 bar) (superheated).

The engine house comprised the following equipment:

- 3 × 100 hp (75 kW) Willlans engines coupled to a Laurence Scott generating machine
- 3 × 300 hp (220 kW) Willans engines coupled to a Laurence Scott generating machine
- 1 × Triple expansion Howden engine
- 1 × 750 kW Willans-Westinghouse turbines coupled to a rotary converter giving a DC supply.

Lincoln's tram system was taken over by Lincoln Corporation in 1905 and was electrified taking DC traction power from the Brayford power station.

During the First World War the engineering company Clayton and Shuttleworth required a 3.3 kV electricity supply from the municipal power station. However, as demand increased the corporation's station was unable to meet this demand.

== Clayton and Shuttleworth / Corporation power station, 1917–53 ==
To meet its requirements for electricity for the war effort Clayton and Shuttleworth built a private supply power station (53°13′39″N 0°31′26″W) in Spa Road on the opposite side of the River Witham to its Titanic Works. The station contained:

- 4 × Babcock & Wilcox land-type boilers
- 3 × 750 kW the A.E.G. Company turbo-generators, 3,300 Volts, 50 Hz
- 1 × 2,000 kW the British Thomson-Houston Company turbo-generators, 3,300 Volts, 50 Hz.

Coal was delivered via a railway siding off of the adjacent railway line.

== Spa Road power station, 1920–53 ==
Lincoln Corporation took over the operation of the Clayton and Shuttleworth station in 1918/19. New plant was ordered and commissioned in 1921 and comprised:

- 4 × Marine type Babcock & Wilcox boilers, each with a capacity of 36,000 lb/hr (4.53 kg/s)
- 2 × 5,000 kW turbo-alternators, 6,600 Volts, 50 Hz.

To allow for further expansion the Corporation purchased five acres (2.0 hectares) of land to allow for a projected total generating capacity of 40,000 to 50,000 kW to be built.

The flow of the River Witham in summer was limited and was unable to meet the cooling water demand of the power station. Therefore, the new station was provided with a cooling pond east of the station building. The pond was 173 feet (53 m) square.

By 1923 the generating plant comprised:

- 3 × 795 kW turbo-alternators
- 2 × 2,000 kW turbo-alternators
- 2 × 5,000 kW turbo-alternators.

In 1923 the power station generated a total of 14.548 GWh; the total load on the system was 6,300 kW; and there was a connected load of 10,728 kW. The amount of electricity sold and the amount of revenue generated by the power station was as follows:

Lincoln power station 1923
Supply for:	Electricity sold, MWh	Revenue
Lighting and Domestic	729.790	£20,973
Public lighting	25.353	£646
Traction	178.956	£1,613
Power	10,580.653	£46,582
Bulk supply	–	–
Total	11,512.752	£69,814

The surplus of revenue over expenses was £41,367 for the Corporation of Lincoln.

The Central Electricity Board (CEB) was established in 1926 to purchase electricity from the most efficient ‘selected’ power station across the country and to sell it to electricity undertakings. The CEB was also responsible for the construction of the National Grid, built in 1928–33. Lincoln was connected to the National Grid via a 132 kV substation east of the Spa Road site. In the early 1930s the engineering firm Ruston & Hornsby threatened to install its own electricity power plant. The CEB reduced its prices to the Lincoln electricity undertaking to prevent this loss of demand which would have been about half of the Lincoln undertaking's load.

The electricity plant continued in operation until it was shut down in October 1953, when the new St. Swithins power station was able to support the required load.

== St. Swithins power station, 1947–77 ==
A new Lincoln power station, also called St. Swithins power station, was constructed on the Spa Road site in the post-war period. This was commissioned by Lincoln City Council, but was a controversial addition to the city. There were objections to the four reinforced concrete cooling towers which were as high as the hill on which the cathedral stands and which would spoil the view of the cathedral from the south. Following a public inquiry the developers, Lincoln City Council, agreed to reduce the height of towers to less than 90 feet (27 m) – and the chimneys from 279 to 225 feet (85 to 69 metres). Consent to build the power station was granted in October 1944. Even after approval alternative schemes were proposed: one suggested pumping water from the River Trent at Torksey into the Fossdyke Navigation from where it would flow to the River Witham at Lincoln. It was claimed this would provide sufficient water for cooling without the need for cooling towers.

The first 20 MW generating set of the new station was commissioned in December 1947. Following nationalisation of the British electricity supply industry in 1948 the ownership of Lincoln's power station were transferred to the British Electricity Authority (BEA) (1948–55) then to the Central Electricity Authority (1955–57), and finally the Central Electricity Generating Board (1958–77). Responsibility for the distribution and sales of electricity was transferred to the East Midlands Electricity Board.

Under the BEA a further 20 MW set were commissioned in April 1949. At this stage only half of the new station was built, including a single chimney. The rest of the station and the second chimney and further cooling towers were built in the mid-1950s. The third and fourth generating sets were commissioned in March 1957 and November 1957.

The plant at the completed station in 1958 comprised:

- 4 × Babcock & Wilcox 120,000 lb/hr, 425 psi, 825 °F boilers (15.12 kg/s, 29.3 bar, 441 °C)
- 4 × Richardsons-Westgarth 120,000 lb/hr, 425 psi, 825 °F boilers (15.12 kg/s, 29.3 bar, 441 °C)
- 4 × Brush-Ljungstrom 20 MW turbo-alternators, 6.6 kV.

Cooling water was abstracted from the River Witham, this was supplemented with concrete cooling towers (initially four later six) each with a capacity of 0.670 million gallons per hour (0.846 m^{3}/s). Operating data for Lincoln power stations is shown in the table.

Lincoln power station operating data
Year	Capacity, MW	Electricity output, GWh	Hours run or (load factor %)	Thermal efficiency %
1898	0.156			
1923	16.3	14.548	(26.3%)	
1946		16.826	(19.3%)	12.89
1955	38	80.946	5078	20.97
1956	38	78.517	5929	19.92
1957	57	82.634	5473	19.86
1958	76	67.365	3914	19.76
1961	80	202.738	(30.5%)	20.97
1962	80	230.309	(34.6%)	20.09
1963	80	164.978	(24.78%)	19.70
1967	76	202.538	(32.7%)	20.22
1972	80	148.933	(22.3%)	19.42

In 1958 the Lincoln electricity district supplied an area of 318 square miles and a population of 119,000. The amount of electricity sold and the number and types of consumers was as follows:

Type of consumer	No. of consumers	Electricity sold, MWh
Domestic	34,575	53,426
Commercial	3,541	3,541
Farms	1,063	9,862
Industrial	366	76,470
Public lighting	32	1,042
Total	39,577	163,734

Lincoln power station was shut-down on 21 March 1977. It was derelict for over 25 years and finally demolished in 2007. As of 2020 the site is derelict; although there is an operational 132 kV electricity substation east of the site.
