= Leverton railway station =

Former railway station in Nottinghamshire, England

Leverton

General information
- Location: England
- Coordinates: 53.3262°N 0.8211°W
- Platforms: 2

Other information
- Status: Disused

History
- Original company: Manchester, Sheffield and Lincolnshire Railway
- Pre-grouping: Great Central Railway
- Post-grouping: London and North Eastern Railway

Key dates
- 7 August 1850: Opened
- 2 November 1959: Closed
Location

Leverton railway station was a station between North Leverton with Habblesthorpe and South Leverton, Nottinghamshire, England which closed in November 1959. The line was reopened in 1967 for freight trains serving Cottam power stations, although the rest of line, through to Saxilby and Lincoln via Torksey, closed to passengers in November 1959. The final train was a railtour from Clapham Junction, in September 2019. The line is now officially closed, with the barrier boom arms having been removed at Leverton AHBC, and Westbrecks AHBC. The rails have since turned brown, and are unlikely to be used again.

Former Services

Preceding station	Disused railways	Following station
Retford	Great Central Railway (Clarborough Junction-Cottam-Sykes Junction branch)	Cottam

Several accidents happened at the crossing adjacent to the station, culminating in a near collision with a school bus in January 1970, before automatic half-barriers were later fitted.
