= South Leverton =

Village and civil parish in Nottinghamshire, England

Coordinates: 53.320°N 0.823°W

- Village and civil parish
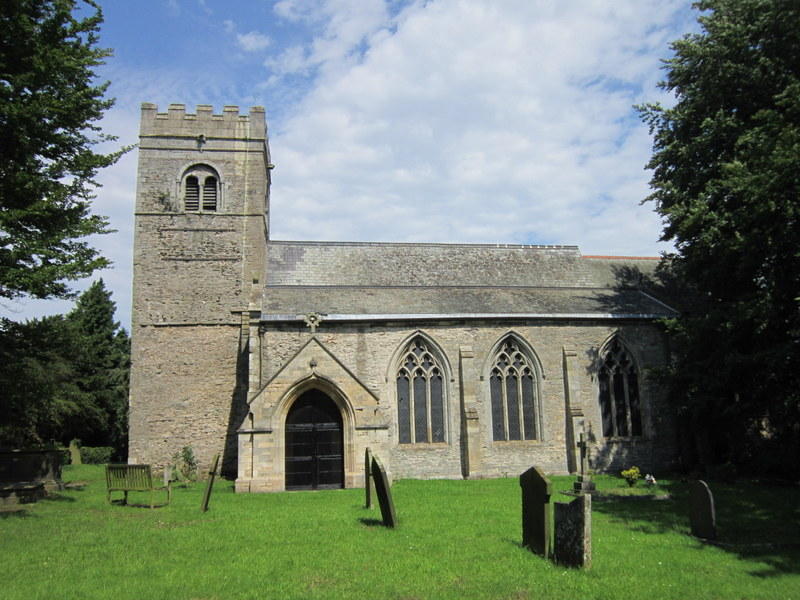
- All Saints Church

- Location within Nottinghamshire
- Interactive map of South Leverton
- Area: 3.43 sq mi (8.9 km^{2})
- Population: 514 (2021 census)
  - Density: 150/sq mi (58/km^{2})
- OS grid reference: SK 783809
  - London: 130 mi (210 km) SSE
- District: Bassetlaw
- Shire county: Nottinghamshire
- Region: East Midlands
- Country: England
- Sovereign state: United Kingdom
- Post town: RETFORD
- Postcode district: DN22
- Dialling code: 01427
- Police: Nottinghamshire
- Fire: Nottinghamshire
- Ambulance: East Midlands
- UK Parliament: Bassetlaw
- Website: www.southleverton-pc.gov.uk

South Leverton is a village and civil parish in Bassetlaw, north Nottinghamshire, England, four miles from Retford. According to the 2001 census it has a population of 478, increasing marginally to 480 at the 2011 census, and more substantially to 514 at the 2021 census.

== Geography ==
South Leverton has a village hall, public house and private school called Orchard School. The parish covers a large area in an east–west direction, stretching across to Cottam in the east and Grove in the west. The parish boundary stretches right to the perimeter of the power station itself, along Cottam Road. To the north is North Leverton with Habblesthorpe and Treswell is to the south. Cottam Power Station is actually in the parish of Treswell. The division between South and North Leverton is the level crossing of the railway that runs through the parish, and eventually to a power station two miles to the south-east.

== History ==
South Leverton is mentioned in the Domesday Book in 1086. Domesday place name: Cledretone People mentioned within entire folio: Aelfric; Countess Gytha; Leofwine; Men of Roger de Bully; Robert, man of William Peverel; Roger de Bully; Roger, man of Roger de Bully; Stapolwine; Thorbiorn; Ulfkil; Walan; William Peverel; Wulfsige Cild

The parish church of All Saints has a square tower at the western end, north and south aisles to either side of the nave, a south porch, a chancel and a vestry. The fabric dates from the twelfth, thirteenth, fourteenth and fifteenth centuries, and the building was restored in the nineteenth century. Ewan Christian worked on the chancel in 1868, and C. Scholefield worked on the rest of the building in 1897. The building has been a grade II* listed structure since 1967. On Retford Road there is a building which was formerly a priory, parts of which date from the twelfth century. It was restored in the nineteenth century, when a large extension was added, and is now used as a home for the elderly. It is a grade II listed structure. There is also a grade II listed, single storey brick-built former Methodist chapel on Church Street, which was erected in 1847.

The village pub is The Plough and is the centre of much village activity. The Railway Inn, formerly next to the level crossing and in the parish, has been demolished. Leverton railway station was on the Manchester, Sheffield and Lincolnshire Railway line that went from Retford over the River Trent to Lincoln. The line opened in 1850 but the section beyond Cottam power stations was closed to passengers in 1959. A contributory factor to the closure was the need for expensive repairs to the Torksey Viaduct which carried the line over the River Trent, and there was an alternative, if slightly longer, route available via Gainsborough Lea Road.

== Proposed wind farm ==
A wind farm to be known as the Cottam Wind Farm was proposed to be built between the village and Cottam by the German company Prowind.

=== Opposition ===
The South Leverton Parish Council conducted a survey to find out the level of support for the wind farm to the east of the village. Out of 305 votes cast (approximately two-thirds of the total population), 299 votes (98.0%) were opposed to the plans. The South Leverton Parish Council said that it was "very pleased with the large number of parishioners who voted" in South Leverton, North Leverton and Sturton le Steeple and with the "overwhelming vote against the development", and that the data "completely contradicts the developer's assertion that 50% of the villagers were in favour of the wind farm."

== Oilfield ==
South Leverton gives its name to the oilfield which runs beneath it, although the well heads are located in nearby Treswell. The field produces high-grade crude oil, which is taken by road to a collection centre at Gainsborough, from where it is transferred by rail to be refined at Immingham. Because of its quality, it is used for the production of chemicals and plastics, rather than for fuel. Oil was discovered at South Leverton in the late 1950s or early 1960s, after Dr Mosaddeq took power in Iran and nationalised the oil industry there. Displaced engineers working for BP returned to the UK, and South Leverton was one of several oilfields which were identified at that time as a result of their exploration skills.

== See also ==
- Listed buildings in South Leverton

== Bibliography ==
- Kingscott, Geoffrey (2004). Lost Railways of Nottinghamshire. Countryside Books. ISBN 1-85306-884-5.
