= Torksey Viaduct =

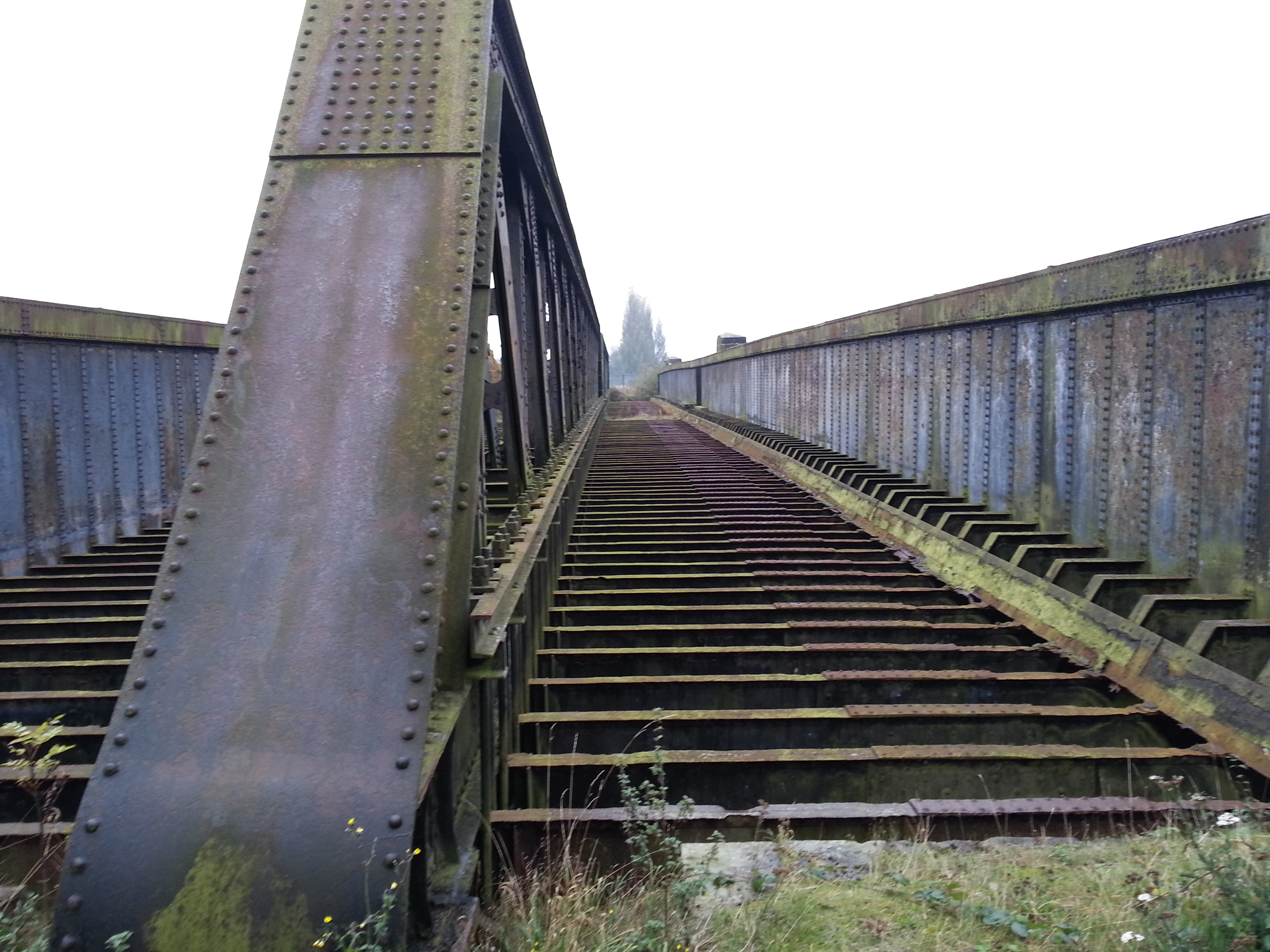
- Torksey viaduct, deck level, facing east; since repaired
- Coordinates: 53.3029°N 0.7476°W
- OS grid reference: SK 83596 79156
- Crosses: River Trent
- Locale: Torksey

Characteristics
- No. of spans: 2

History
- Construction start: 1847
- Construction end: 1849
- Closed: 2 November 1959

Location
- Interactive map of Torksey Viaduct

Torksey Viaduct is a disused Grade II* listed railway bridge at Torksey, Lincolnshire, UK. It has two 130 feet (40 m) spans across the River Trent. It was built between 1847 and 1849 to carry the Manchester, Sheffield and Lincolnshire Railway (Clarborough Junction-Sykes Junction branch). It is of unusual design and is regarded as the first box girder bridge.

It was designed by John Fowler, who had been influenced by Fairbairn and Stephenson's tubular bridges at Conwy and the Menai Straits. The tubular girder bridge was not initially accepted by the Board of Trade's inspector Lintorn Simmons; this decision (and also the basic premise that a bridge designed by a member of the Institution of Civil Engineers which had passed all practical tests could be rejected by a railway inspector because he was uncomfortable with its novel design) was criticised by the ICE: "The subject has been discussed in the Institution of Civil Engineers, and every eminent engineer was of the opinion that the Government inspector was clearly wrong".

Threatened with a call for a parliamentary enquiry should approval continue to be withheld, the Railway Inspectorate reconsidered and approved the bridge un-modified. Subsequently, and consequently, the Board of Trade took the view that (as it explained in defending itself from criticism that the defects in the Tay Bridge should have been seen and acted upon by the Railway Inspectorate): "The duty of an inspecting officer, so far as regards design, is to see that the construction is not such as to transgress those rules and precautions which practice and experience have proved to be necessary for safety. If he were to go beyond this, or if he were to make himself responsible for every novel design, and if he were to attempt to introduce new rules and practices not accepted by the profession, he would be removing from the civil engineer, and taking upon himself a responsibility not committed to him by Parliament."

Torksey bridge was strengthened in 1897 by adding a more conventional central truss above the deck rather than by strengthening the box.

The viaduct was closed to traffic on 2 November 1959, because of the cost of renovating it at a time when British Railways were under pressure to reduce costs, and passenger trains between Retford and Lincoln were diverted via Gainsborough.

The environmental charity Sustrans has carried out work on the viaduct in preparation for opening it as a walk/cycle-way. They obtained planning permission in 2015 for the paths, which Sustrans aimed to link as a walking and cycling route to connect the quiet roads east of Torksey with those west of Cottam, a village about 1.2 miles (2 km) to the west.

In April 2016, the viaduct was opened to both cyclists and walkers.

== See also ==
- List of crossings of the River Trent
