= Edwin Clark (civil engineer) =

English civil engineer

- Born: 7 January 1814; Great Marlow, Buckinghamshire
- Died: 22 October 1894 (aged 80); Marlow, Buckinghamshire, England
- Known for: Mathematics master [teacher], Civil Engineer, Hydraulic Engineer, Electrical Engineer, Astronomer

Edwin Clark FRAS (7 January 1814 – 22 October 1894) was an English Civil Engineer, specialising in hydraulics. He is remembered principally as the designer of the Anderton Boat Lift (1875) near Northwich in Cheshire, which links the navigable stretch of the River Weaver with the Trent and Mersey Canal.

== Early life and work ==
Clark was born at Great Marlow in Buckinghamshire, where his father made pillow lace. He had two younger brothers and attended his local school. When he was aged 11, he was sent to a French academy in Normandy for three years, where he became sufficiently proficient in the French language that he was able to translate texts from English to French professionally. Returning to England, he spent some time working in a solicitor's office owned by his uncle. He was at one time a mathematical master at Brook Green, then became a Surveyor in the west of England.

In 1846 Clark went to London where he met Robert Stephenson, who appointed him Superintending engineer of the Britannia Bridge. Clark, in turn, appointed his brother Josiah Latimer Clark as his Assistant Engineer. When the Britannia Bridge opened on 5 March 1850, Clark published a book The Britannia and Conway Tubular Bridges (3 vols), and by August of that year he had moved on to become an Engineer with the Electric and International Telegraph Company, where he took out the first of several patents for telegraph apparatus; the London and North Western Railway used Clark's telegraph between London and Rugby from 1855.

Stephenson bequeathed him £2000 which he used to build a telescope on top of his house in Honor Oak. He was also known for his astronomy.

== Thames Hydraulic Lift Graving Dock ==
In 1857 Clark became Engineer to the Thames Graving Dock Limited, for which he designed a graving dock in which the ships to be repaired were lifted from the water by hydraulic presses, based on his experience of lifting the tubular sections of Stephenson's Britannia and Conwy tubular bridges over the Menai Strait. In 1866 he delivered a lecture on the subject to the Institution of Civil Engineers, after the lift had been successfully used for about seven years and had raised 1055 ships at a cost of £3 per ship. He was awarded a Telford Medal for the lecture.

== Clark's boat lifts ==
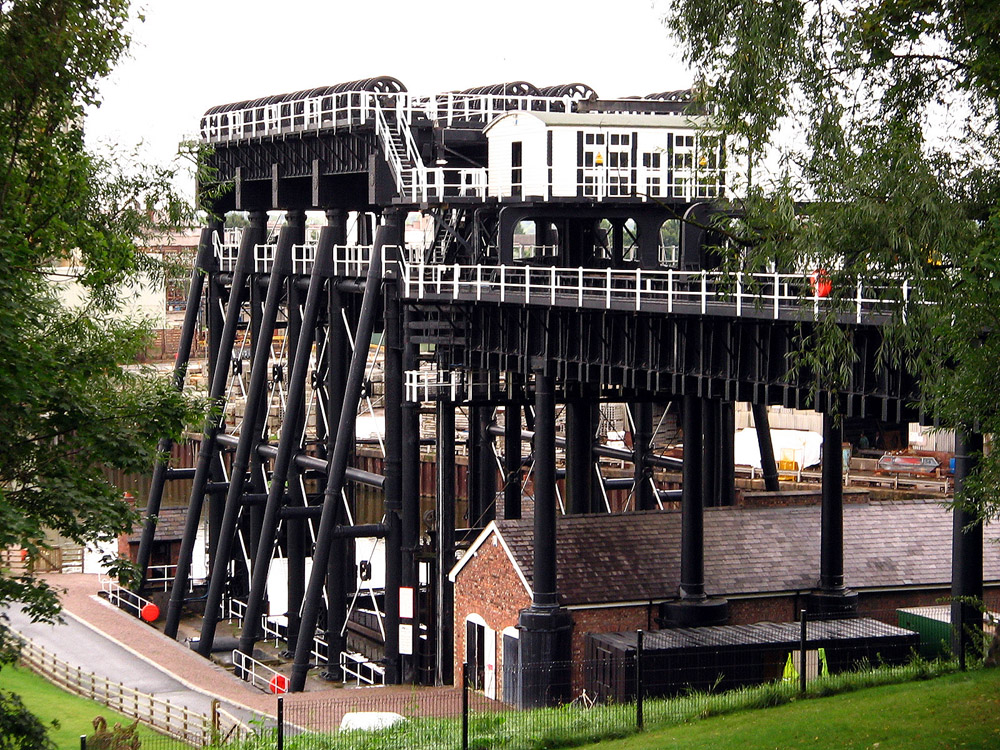
Edwin Clark's best known achievement in the UK, the Anderton Boat Lift

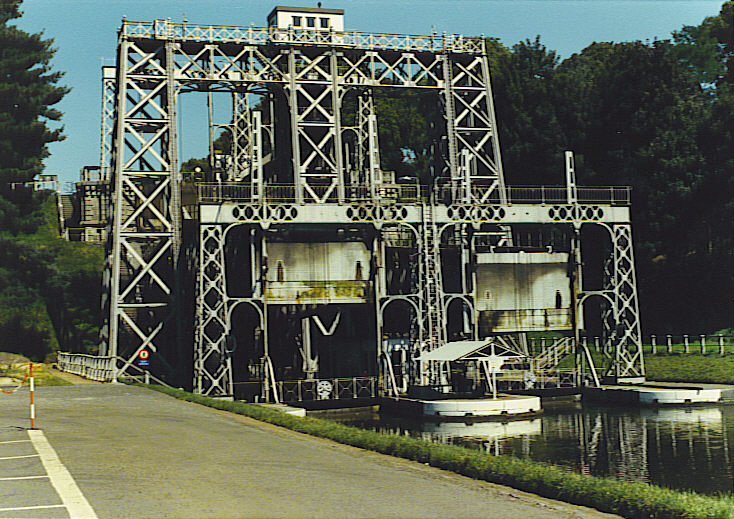
Lift at Strépy-Bracquegnies (Belgium), one of a series of four World Heritage Clark lifts

Clark was an experienced Hydraulic Engineer with the firm of Clark, Stansfield & Clark, consulting engineers of Westminster, when he was called upon in 1870 by Edward Leader Williams to design a boat lift to raise boats 50 feet from the River Weaver to the Trent and Mersey Canal. Clark designed the original hydraulic structure opened in 1875, which was later replaced by a wire rope and pulley system from 1908 to 1983 before being returned to hydraulic operation in 2002.

He went on to design other boat lifts in other European countries. In 1879, he presented a project to the Belgian government that included four of his lifts. This project received governmental approval in 1882, but it was 1917 before it was totally operational. When the canal was modernised in the 1960s, the original plan was to demolish the old installations and to redevelop the land. Local objections, and wishes to maintain the installations, were upheld after a long period and in 1988, the whole site of the Canal du Centre became a World Heritage Site. In 2007, the restoration work at all but one of the four Belgian Clark lifts was almost finished.

== Legacy ==
Clark appears in the painting Conference of Engineers at the Menai Straits Preparatory to Floating one of the Tubes of the Britannia Bridge by John Lucas, and is also remembered in the name of the public trip boat that operates on the Anderton Boat Lift.

== See also ==
- Canals of the United Kingdom
- History of the British canal system
