= Cottam railway station =

Former railway station in Nottinghamshire, England

Coordinates: 53.3092°N 0.7740°W

Cottam
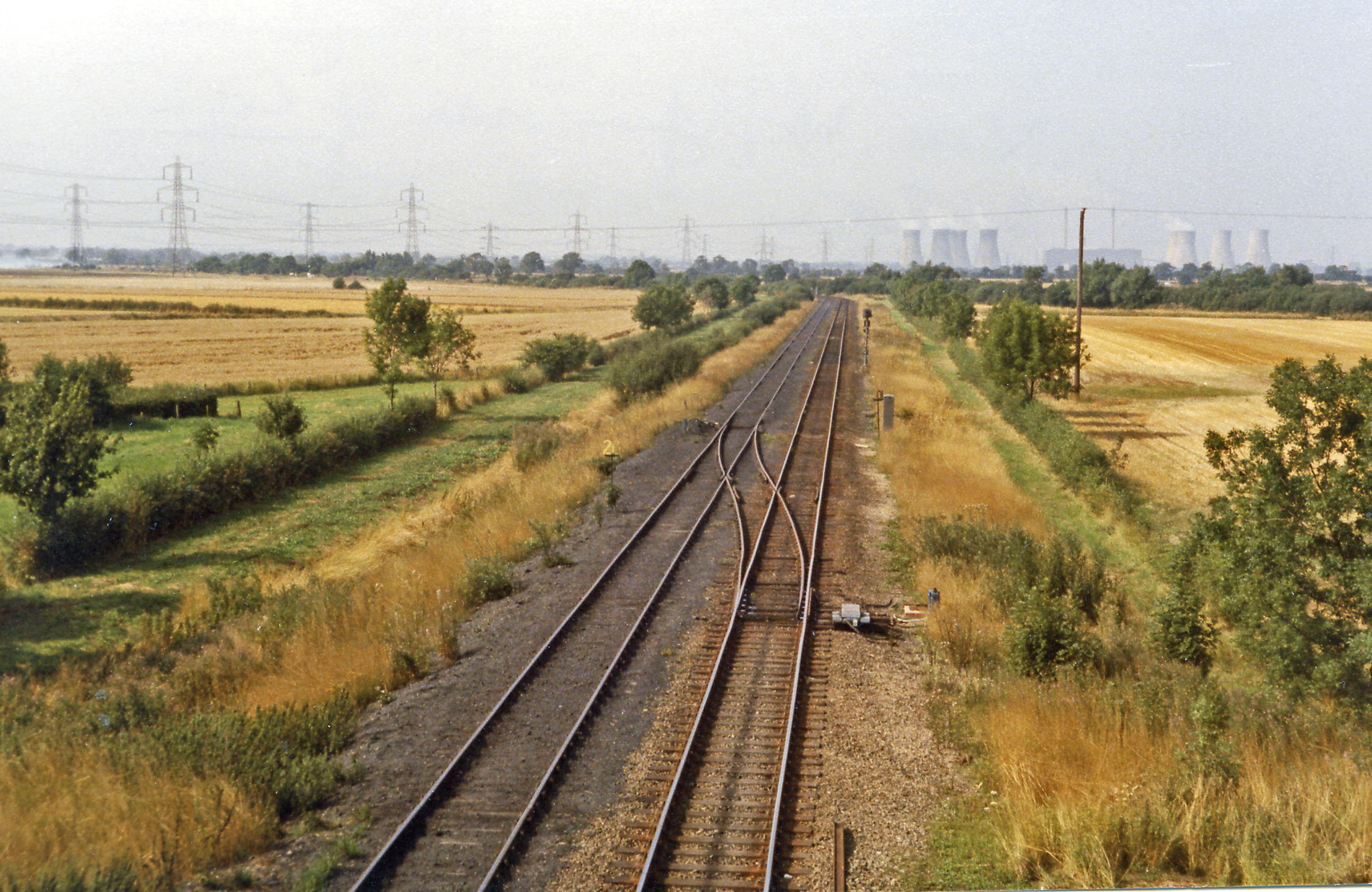
- Track near Cottham Power Station, the station was roughly after the power station on an abandoned section of the line through Torksey to Saxilby.

General information
- Location: England
- Platforms: 2

Other information
- Status: Disused

History
- Original company: Manchester, Sheffield and Lincolnshire Railway
- Pre-grouping: Great Central Railway
- Post-grouping: London and North Eastern Railway

Key dates
- December 1850: Opened
- 2 November 1959: Closed
Location

Cottam railway station was a station in Cottam, Nottinghamshire, England which is now closed. Part of the route on which the station was located remained in use for freight trains serving Cottam power stations, with the final train running in September 2019. The line is now officially closed, and hasn't been used since then. The line through to Saxilby and Lincoln via Torksey closed to passengers in November 1959.

Preceding station	Disused railways	Following station
Leverton	Great Central Railway; Clarborough Junction-Cottam-Sykes Junction branch	Torksey
