= Box girder =

Type of girder

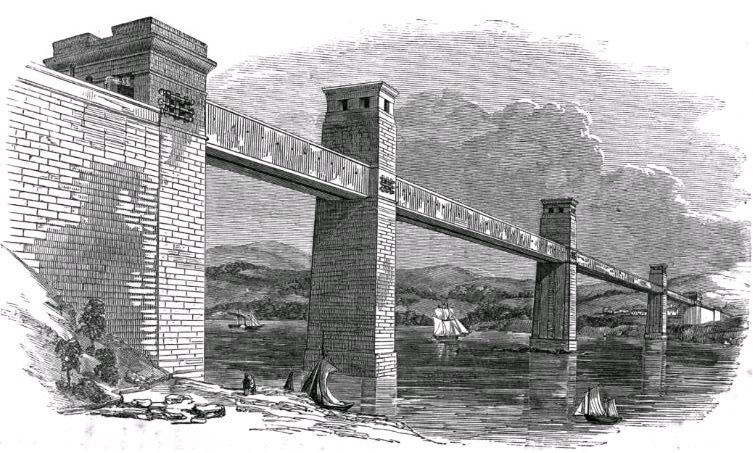
The old Britannia Bridge with train track inside the box-girder tunnel

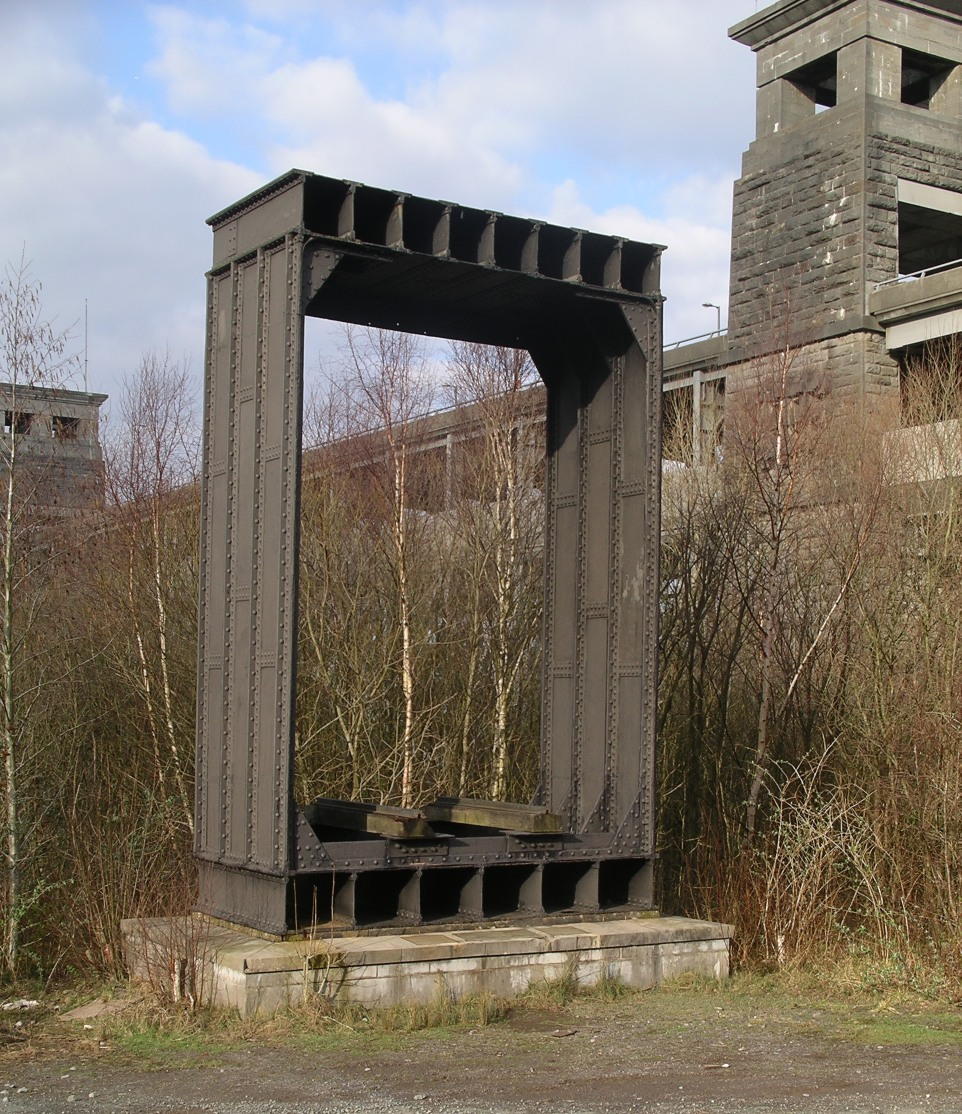
Section of the original tubular Britannia Bridge

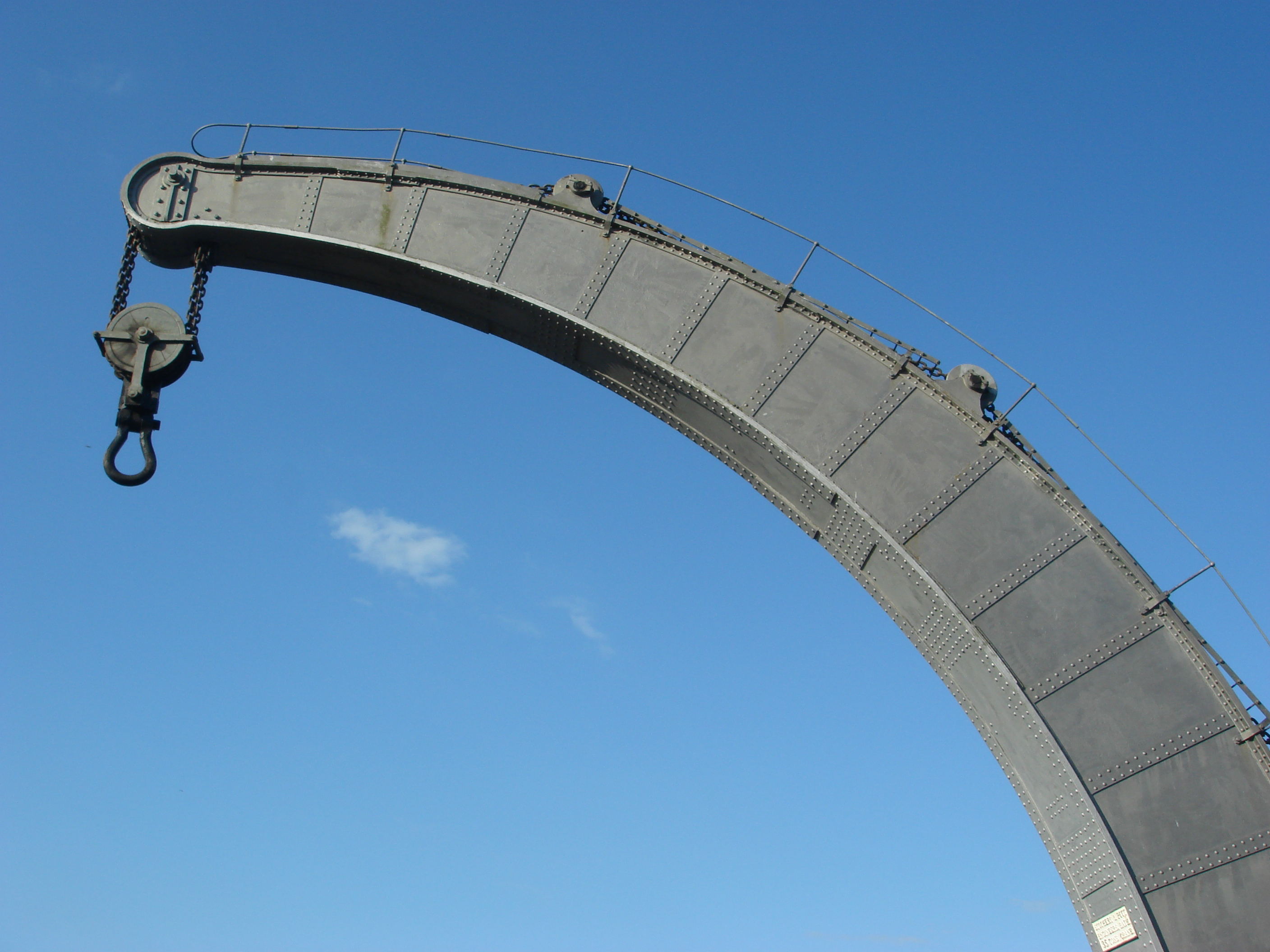
The patent curved and tapered box girder jib of a Fairbairn steam crane

A box girder or tubular girder (or box beam) is a girder that forms an enclosed tube with multiple walls, as opposed to an I-beam or H-beam. Originally constructed of wrought iron joined by riveting, they are now made of rolled or welded steel, aluminium extrusions or prestressed concrete.

Compared to an I-beam, the advantage of a box girder is that it better resists torsion. Having multiple vertical webs, it can also carry more load than an I-beam of equal height (although it will use more material than a taller I-beam of equivalent capacity).

The distinction in naming between a box girder and a tubular girder is imprecise. Generally the term box girder is used, especially if it is rectangular in section. Where the girder carries its "content" inside the "box", such as the Britannia Bridge, it is termed a tubular girder. Tubular girder is also used if the girder is round or oval in cross-section, such as the Royal Albert Bridge.

Where a large box girder contains more than two walls, i.e. with multiple boxes, it is referred to as a cellular girder.

== Development ==
The theoretical basis of the box girder was largely the work of the engineer Sir William Fairbairn, with the aid of the mathematician Eaton Hodgkinson, around 1830. They sought to design for the most efficient beam possible in the new material of riveted wrought iron plates.

=== Cellular construction ===
Most girders are statically loaded such that one web is in compression, the other in tension. Fairbairn's original cranes used a primitive cellular construction for the compression face for their jib, so as to resist buckling. This jib was curved, tapered and formed of riveted wrought iron plates. Three cells were formed inside the concave (lower) face of this girder, again of riveted plates.

Where a tubular girder is used as a bridge span (i.e. loaded in the centre rather than at one end, like a crane) the compressive force is in the top web of the girder and so the cells are placed at the top. Dynamic forces (moving loads, wind) may also require both faces to be cellular. (The preserved Britannia Bridge section shows that both top and bottom flanges were of cellular construction, but (according to Fairbairn) the cellular construction of the bottom flange was adopted, not because of the nature of the forces it had to withstand, but because of their magnitude and the consequent "practical difficulties which would have been encountered, had it been attempted to achieve the requisite sectional area in a solid mass")

The Fairbairn crane box girder isn't a "cellular girder" as that term is used in modern spaceframe or geodesic construction, as rather than sharing loads from the entire girder its "cells" merely act to stiffen one plate in isolation. The engineering required for the design of complex integrated structures was not available in Fairbairn's day.

== In bridges ==
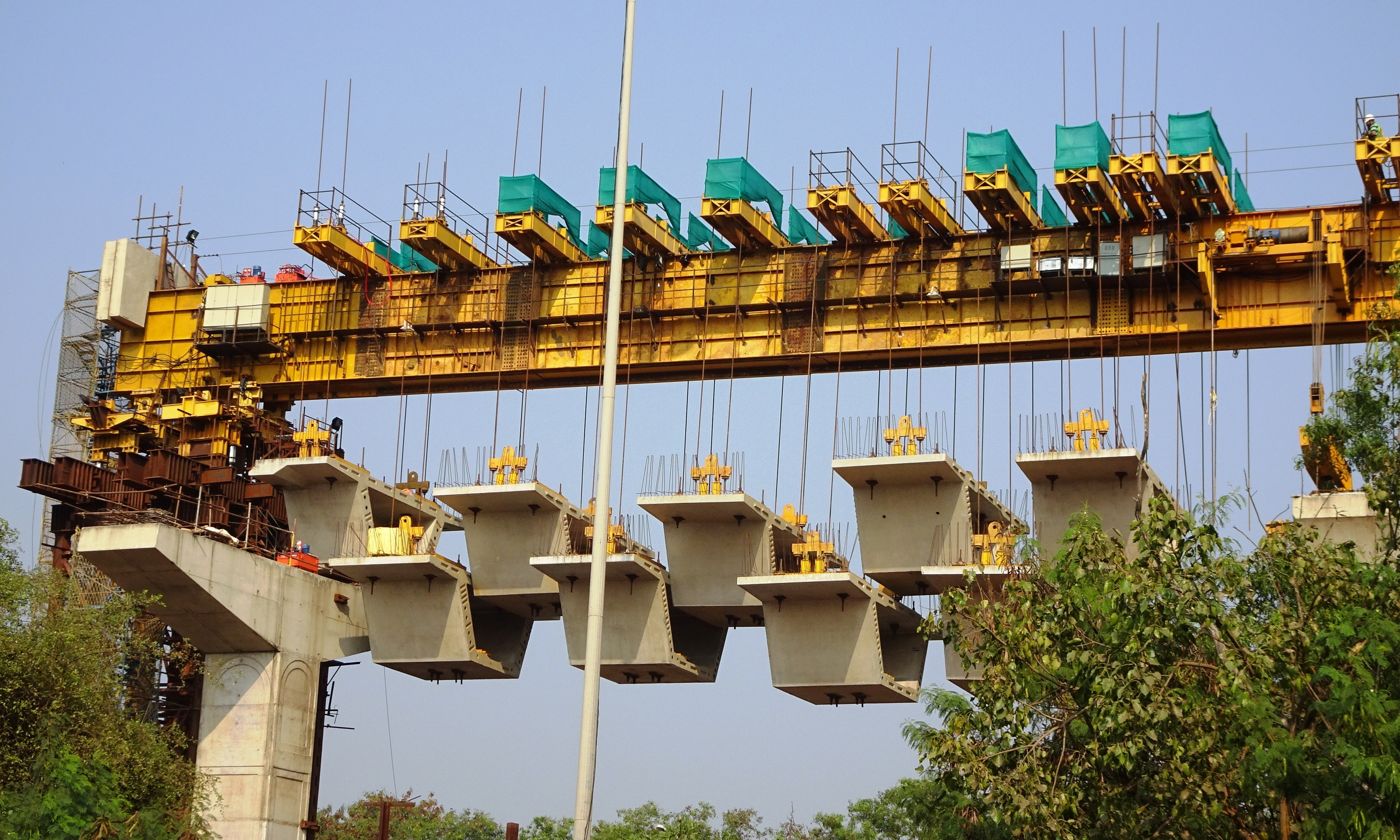
Bridge built using multiple box girders

Fairbairn's theoretical girder design appeared just as there was increasing demand for long railway bridges. Robert Stephenson engaged both him and Hodgkinson as consultants to assist with his Britannia and Conwy bridges, both of which contained the railway track within a large tubular girder. Shortly afterwards Brunel also chose to use a pair of small diameter round girders as part of a larger truss at Chepstow. However, although many of the longest-span railway bridges in use in the 1860s used tubular or box girders Benjamin Baker in his Long-Span Railway Bridges was already dismissing the 'box girder with web plates' as 'the most unfavourable type for long-span railway bridges which it will be necessary for us to investigate'. The Coronado Bay Bridge has the tallest box girder.

Box girder bridges of shallow rectangular cross-section and aerofoil characteristics became extensively used in road bridges from the 1960s onwards, such as the Severn Bridge, being much lighter than the deeper truss-type girder construction used on previous bridges such as the Golden Gate Bridge.

== Safety concerns over box girder bridges ==
In the early 1970s, a number of box girder bridges collapsed during construction: the Cleddau Bridge in Wales, West Gate Bridge in Australia and the Koblenz Bridge in Germany. That led to serious concerns over the continued use of box girders and extensive studies of their safety, which involved an early use of computer modelling, and was a spur to the development of finite element analysis in civil engineering.

== See also ==
- Hollow structural section
- Structural steel

== Bridges ==
- Tubular bridges
  - Britannia Bridge
  - Conwy Railway Bridge
- Box girder bridges
  - Severn Bridge
  - Cleddau Bridge
  - West Gate Bridge
  - Koblenz Bridge
  - Gateway Bridge, Brisbane, Queensland, Australia
