= Britannia Bridge =

Road-rail bridge over the Menai Strait

Britannia Bridge Pont Britannia
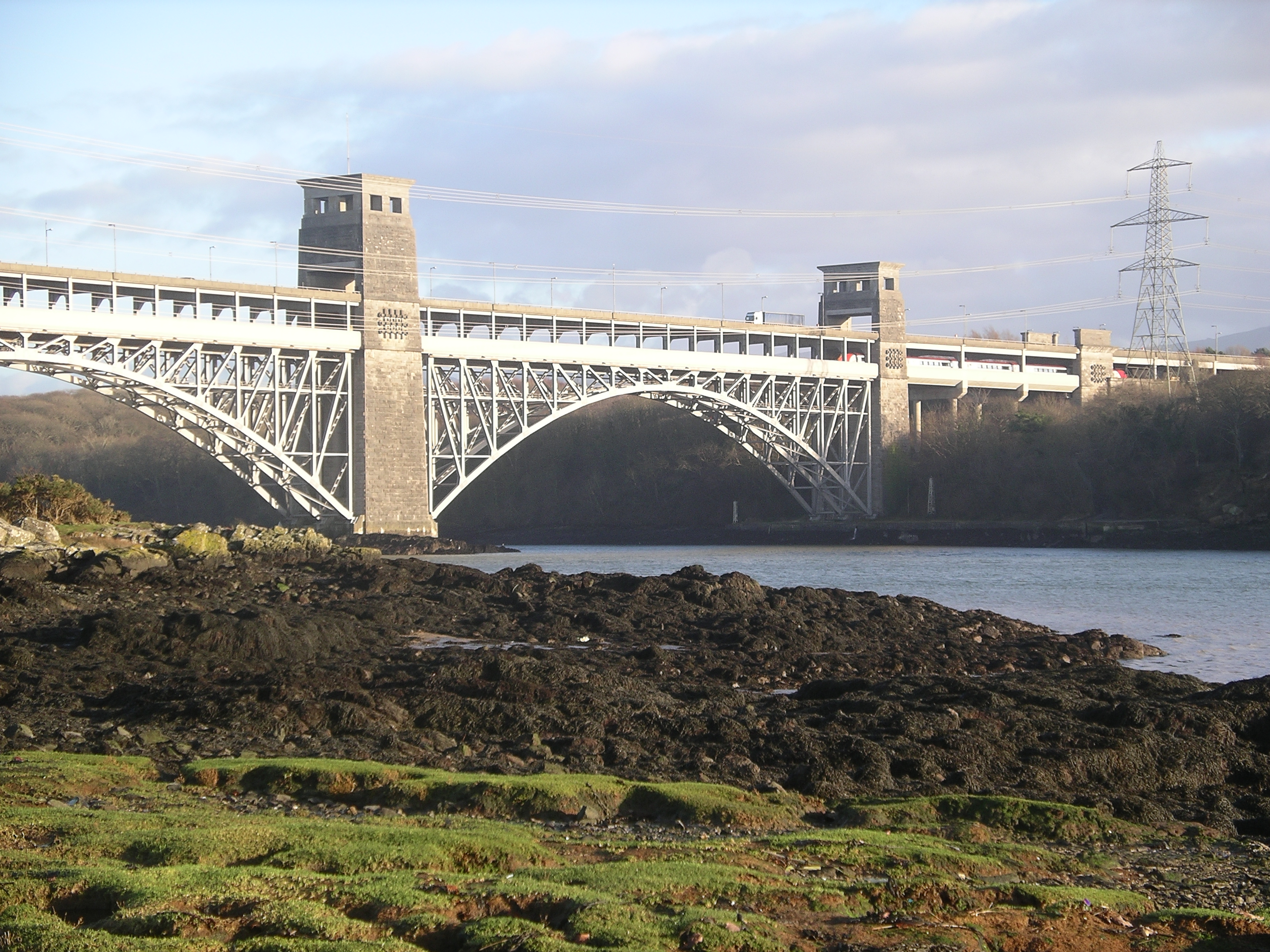
- The modern Britannia Bridge.
- Coordinates: 53°12′59″N 4°11′9″W
- Carried: North Wales Coast Line; A55
- Crossed: Menai Strait
- Locale: Anglesey, North Wales

Characteristics
- Design: Tubular bridge (first bridge); Two-tier truss arch bridge (second bridge)
- Material: Wrought iron and stone (first bridge); Steel and concrete (second bridge)
- Total length: 1,510.25 ft (460.32 m)
- Height: 221.25 ft (67.44 m) to top of centre tower
- Longest span: 460 ft (140 m)
- No. of spans: Four
- Piers in water: One
- Clearance above: 103 ft (31 m) to bottom of rail deck

History
- Designer: Robert Stephenson
- Construction start: 1846; 180 years ago (first bridge); 1972; 54 years ago (second bridge)
- Construction end: 1850; 176 years ago (first bridge); 1980; 46 years ago (second bridge)
- Opened: 1850; 176 years ago (rail, first bridge); 1974; 52 years ago (rail, second bridge); 1980 (road, second bridge)
- Destroyed: 23 May 1970 (first bridge)
- Closed: 1974; 52 years ago (first bridge)

Location
- Interactive map of Britannia Bridge

Britannia Bridge (Welsh: Pont Britannia) is a bridge in Wales that crosses the Menai Strait between the Isle of Anglesey and the city of Bangor. It was originally designed and built by the noted railway engineer Robert Stephenson as a tubular bridge of wrought iron rectangular box-section spans for carrying rail traffic. Its importance was to form a critical link of the Chester and Holyhead Railway's route, enabling trains to directly travel between London and the port of Holyhead, thus facilitating a sea link to Dublin, Ireland.

Two decades before the building of the Britannia Bridge, the Menai Suspension Bridge had been completed, but this structure carried a road rather than track; there was no rail connection to Anglesey before the construction of the Britannia Bridge. After many years of deliberation and proposals, on 30 June 1845, a Parliamentary Bill covering the construction of the Britannia Bridge received royal assent. At the Admiralty's insistence, the bridge elements were required to be relatively high in order to permit the passage of a fully rigged man-of-war. In order to meet the diverse requirements, Stephenson, the project's chief engineer, performed in-depth studies on the concept of tubular bridges. For the detailed design of the structure's girders, Stephenson gained the assistance of distinguished engineer William Fairbairn. On 10 April 1846, the foundation stone for the Britannia Bridge was laid. The construction method used for the riveted wrought iron tubes was derived from contemporary shipbuilding practices; the same technique as used for the Britannia Bridge was also used on the smaller Conwy Railway Bridge. On 5 March 1850, Stephenson himself fitted the last rivet of the structure, marking the bridge's official completion.

On 3 March 1966, the Britannia Bridge received Grade II listed status.

A fire in May 1970 caused extensive damage to the Britannia Bridge. Subsequent investigation determined that the damage to the tubes was so extensive that they were not realistically repairable. The bridge was rebuilt in a quite different configuration, reusing the piers while employing new arches to support not one but two decks, as the new Britannia Bridge was to function as a combined road-and-rail bridge. The bridge was rebuilt in phases, initially reopening in 1972 as a single-tier steel truss arch bridge, carrying only rail traffic. Over the next eight years more of the structure was replaced, allowing for more trains to run and a second tier to be completed. The second tier was opened to accommodate road traffic in 1980. The bridge was subject to a £4 million four-month in-depth maintenance programme during 2011. Since the 1990s, there has been talk of increasing road capacity over the Menai Strait, either by extending the road deck of the existing bridge or via the construction of a third bridge.

== Design ==
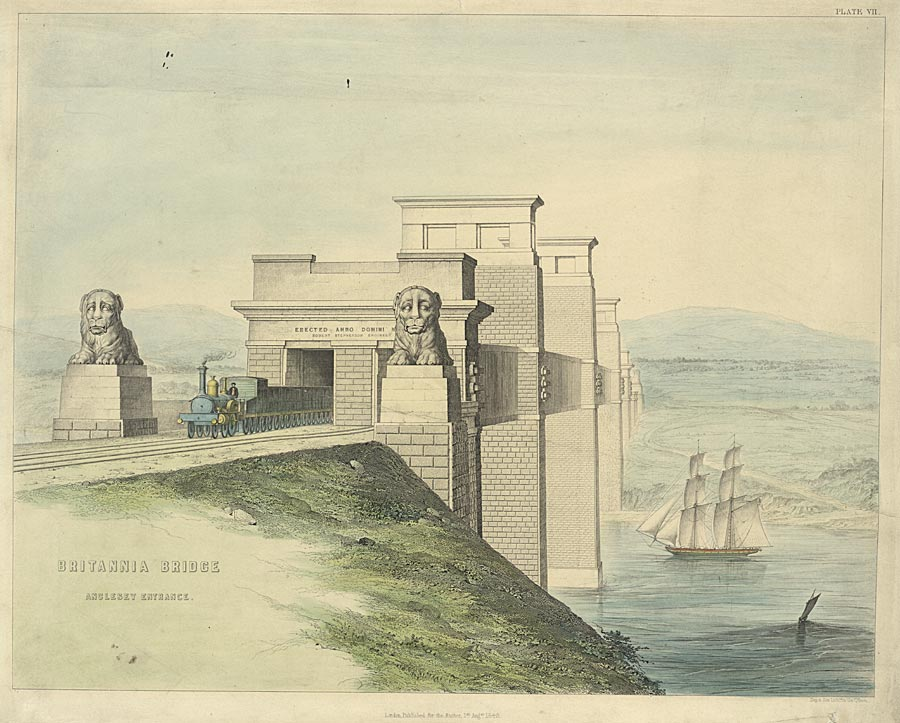
Britannia Bridge entrance

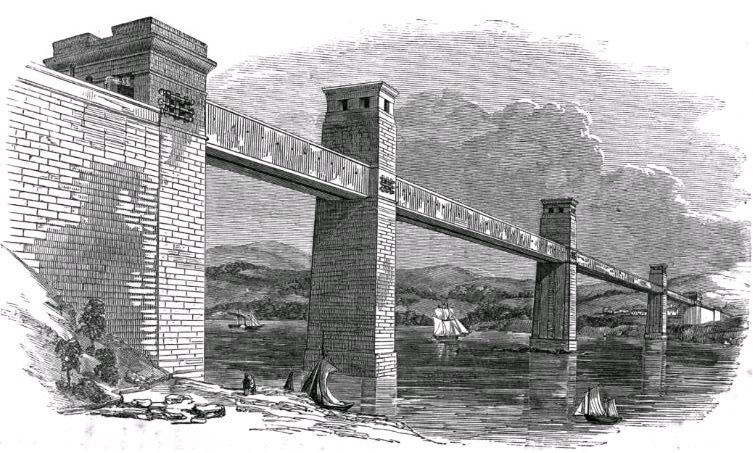
The original box section Britannia Bridge, circa 1852.

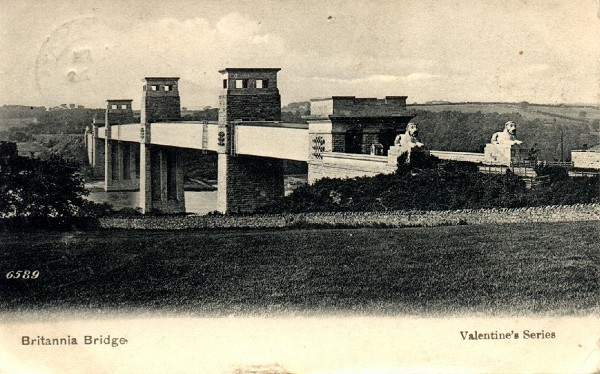
Postcard picture of the bridge from circa 1902

The opening of the Menai Bridge in 1826, one mile (1.6 km) to the east of where Britannia Bridge was later built, provided the first fixed road link between Anglesey and the mainland. The increasing popularity of rail travel shortly necessitated a second bridge to provide a direct rail link between London and the port of Holyhead, the Chester and Holyhead Railway.

Other railway schemes were proposed, including one in 1838 to cross Thomas Telford's existing Menai Bridge. Railway pioneer George Stephenson was invited to comment on this proposal but stated his concern about re-using a single carriageway of the suspension bridge, as bridges of this type were unsuited to locomotive use. By 1840, a Treasury committee decided broadly in favour of Stephenson's proposals, however, final consent to the route, including Britannia Bridge, would not be granted until 30 June 1845, the date on which the corresponding Parliamentary Bill received royal assent. Around the same time, Stephenson's son, Robert Stephenson, was appointed as chief engineer for the project.

At the Admiralty's insistence, any bridge would have to permit passage of the strait by a fully rigged man-of-war. Stephenson therefore intended to cross the strait at a high level, over 100 ft (30 m), by a bridge with two main spans of 460-foot-long (140 m), rectangular iron tubes, each weighing 1,500 long tons (1,500 tonnes; 1,700 short tons), supported by masonry piers, the centre one of which was to be built on the Britannia Rock. Two additional spans of 230 ft (70 m) length would complete the bridge, making a 1,511-foot-long (461 m) continuous girder. The trains were to run inside the tubes (inside the box girders). Up until then, the longest wrought iron span had been 31 feet 6 inches (9.60 m), barely one fifteenth of the bridge's spans of 460 ft (140 m). As originally envisaged by Stephenson, the tubular construction would give a structure sufficiently stiff to support the heavy loading associated with trains, but the tubes would not be fully self-supporting, some of their weight having to be taken by suspension chains.

For the detailed design of the girders, Stephenson secured the assistance of the distinguished engineer William Fairbairn, an old friend of his father and described by Stephenson as "well known for his thorough practical knowledge in such matters". Fairbairn began a series of practical experiments on various tube shapes and enlisted the help of Eaton Hodgkinson "distinguished as the first scientific authority on the strength of iron beams" It became apparent from Fairbairn's experiments that- without special precautions - the failure mode for the tube under load would be buckling of the top plate in compression, the theoretical analysis of which gave Hodgkinson some difficulty. When Stephenson reported to the directors of the railway in February 1846, he attached reports by both Hodgkinson and Fairbairn. From his analysis of the resistance to buckling of tubes with single top plates, Hodgkinson believed that it would require an impracticably thick (and therefore heavy) top plate to make the tubes stiff enough to support their own weight, and advised auxiliary suspension from link chains.

However, Fairbairn's experiments had moved on from those covered by Hodgkinson's theory to include designs in which the top plate was stiffened by 'corrugation' (the incorporation of cylindrical tubes). The results of these later experiments he found very encouraging; whilst it was still to be determined what the optimum form of the tubular girder should be "I would venture to state that a Tubular Bridge can be constructed of such powers and dimensions as will meet, with perfect security, the requirements of railway traffic across the Straits" although it might require more materials than originally envisaged and the utmost care would be needed in its construction. He believed it would be 'highly improper' to rely upon chains as the principal support of the bridge.

Under every circumstance, I am of opinion that the tubes should be made sufficiently strong to sustain not only their own weight, but in addition to that load 2000 tons equally distributed over the surface of the platform, a load ten times greater than they will ever be called upon to support. In fact, it should be a huge sheet-iron hollow girder, of sufficient strength and stiffness to sustain those weights; and, provided that the parts are well-proportioned and the plates properly riveted, you may strip off the chains and have it as a useful monument of the enterprise and energy of the age in which it was constructed.

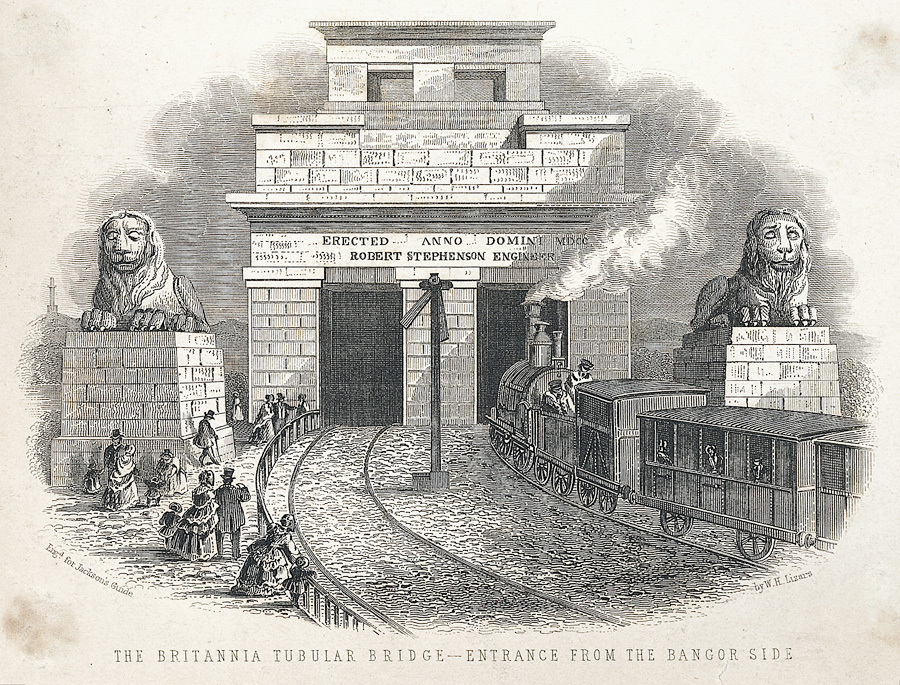
A view of the entrance to the Britannia Bridge from the Bangor side, showing a steam train entering the bridge, people watching, two large stone lions and an inscription relating to the engineer, Robert Stephenson

Stephenson's report drew attention to the difference of opinion between his experts, but reassured the directors that the design of the masonry piers allowed for the tubes to be given suspension support, and no view need yet be taken as to the need for it, which would be resolved by further experiments. A 75-foot (23 m) span model was constructed and tested at Fairbairn's Millwall shipyard, and used as a basis for the final design. Stephenson, who had not previously attended any of Fairbairn's experiments, was present at one involving this 'model tube', and consequently was persuaded that auxiliary chains were unnecessary. No chains were fitted. As the only purpose of the piers (above the level of the present road deck) was to support the chains, these piers have never had any practical use. Although Stephenson had pressed for the tubes to be elliptical in section, Fairbairn's preferred rectangular section was adopted. Fairbairn was responsible both for the cellular construction of the top part of the tubes, and for developing the stiffening of the side panels. Each main span weighed roughly 1,830 tonnes.

== Construction and use ==
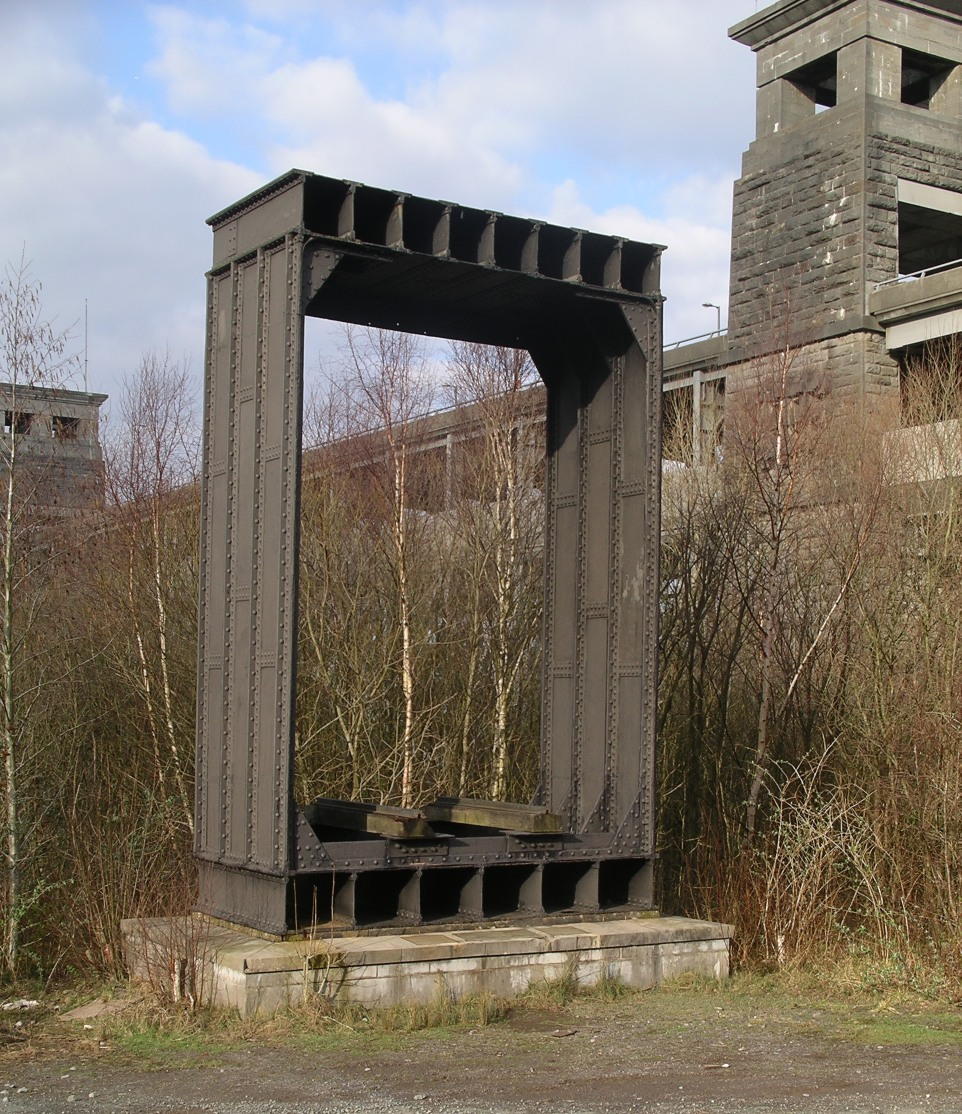
A section of the original wrought-iron tubular bridge standing beside the modern crossing.

On 10 April 1846, the foundation stone for the Britannia Bridge was laid, marking the official commencement of construction work at the site. The resident engineer for the structure's construction was civil engineer Edwin Clark, who had previously aided Stephenson in performing the complex structural stress calculations involved in its design process. The first major elements of the structure to be built were the side tubes, this work was performed in situ, using wooden platforms to support it. The construction method used for the iron tubes was derived from contemporary shipbuilding practices, being composed of riveted wrought iron plates 5/8 inch (16 mm) thick, complete with sheeted sides and cellular roofs and bases. The same technique as used for the Britannia Bridge was also used on the smaller Conwy Railway Bridge, which was built around the same time. On 10 August 1847, the first rivet was driven.

Working in parallel to the onsite construction process, the two central tube sections, which weighed 1,800 long tons (1,830 tonnes) apiece, were separately built on the nearby Caernarfon shoreline. Once they had been fully assembled, each of the central tubes was floated, one at a time, into the causeway and directly below the structure. The in-place sections were gradually raised into place using powerful hydraulic cylinders; they were only raised by a few inches at a time, after which supports would be built underneath the section to keep it in place. This aspect of the bridge's construction was novel at the time. Reportedly, the innovative process had been responsible for costing Stephenson several nights of sleep at one stage of the project. The work did not go smoothly; at one point, one of the tubes allegedly came close to being swept out to sea before being recaptured and finally pushed back into place. The tubes were manoeuvred into place between June 1849 and February 1850.

Once in place, the separate lengths of tube were joined to form parallel prestressed continuous structures, each one possessing a length of 1,511 feet (460.6 m) and weighing 5,270 long tons (5,350 tonnes). The pre-stressing process had increased the structure's loadbearing capacity and reduced deflection. The tubes had a width of 15 feet (4.5 m) and differed between 23 feet (7 m) and 30 feet (9.1 m) in overall depth, while also having a 10 foot (3 m) gap between them; they were supported on a series of 15-foot-long (4.6 m) cast iron beams that were embedded in the stonework of the towers. To better protect the iron from the weather, an arched timber roof was constructed to cover both tubes; it was roughly 39 feet (12 m) wide, continuous over their whole length, and covered with tarred hessian. A 12 foot (3.7 m) wide central walkway was present above the roof for the purpose of producing maintenance access.

On 5 March 1850, Stephenson himself fitted the last rivet of the structure, marking the bridge's official completion. Altogether, the bridge had taken over three years to complete. On 18 March 1850, a single tube was opened to rail traffic. By 21 October of that year, both tubes had been opened to traffic.

For its time, the Britannia Bridge was a structure of "magnitude and singular novelty", far surpassing in length both contemporary cast beam or plate girder iron bridges. The noted engineer Isambard Kingdom Brunel, a professional rival and personal friend of Stephenson's, was claimed to have remarked to him: "If your bridge succeeds, then mine have all been magnificent failures". On 20 June 1849, Brunel and Stephenson had both looked on as the first of the bridge's tubes was floated out on its pontoons. The construction techniques employed on the Britannia Bridge had obviously influenced Brunel as he later made use of the same method of floating bridge sections during the construction of the Royal Albert Bridge across the River Tamar at Saltash.

There was originally a railway station located on the east side of the bridge at the entrance to the tunnel, run by the Chester and Holyhead Railway company, which served local rail traffic in both directions. However, this station was closed after only 8 1/2 years in operation owing to low passenger volumes. In the present day, little remains of this station, other than the remnants of the lower-level station building. A new station named Menai Bridge was opened shortly afterwards.

=== Lions ===
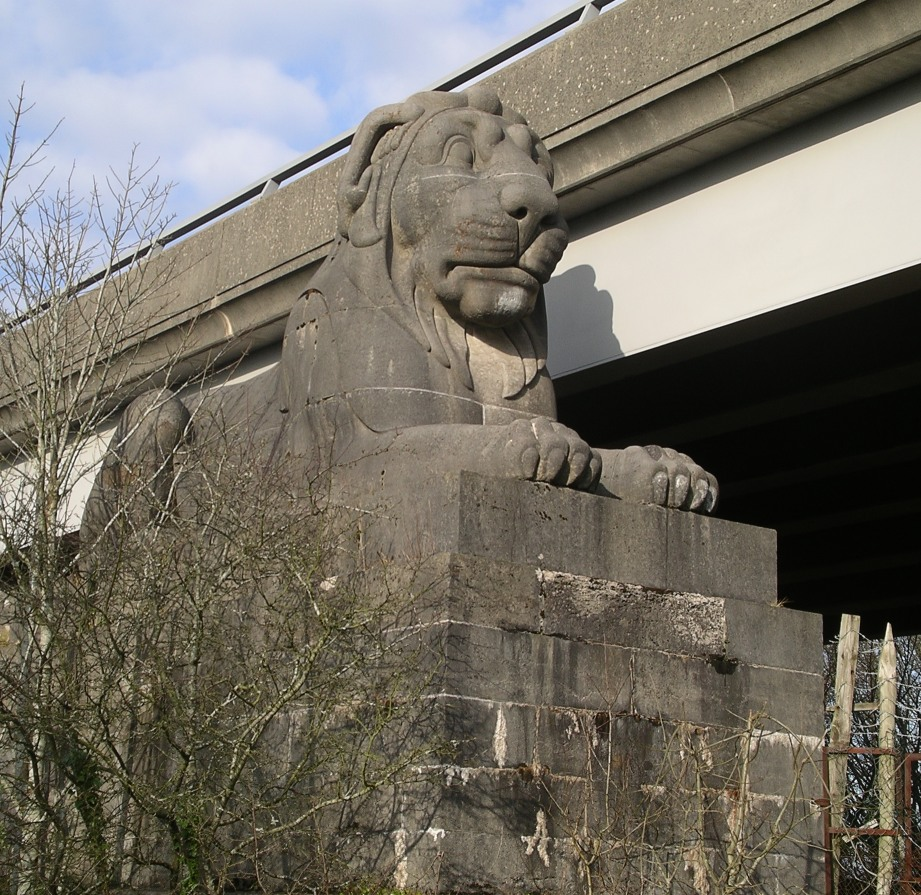
One of four Monumental lions that stand at each corner of Britannia Bridge.

The bridge was decorated by four large lions sculpted in limestone by John Thomas, two at either end. Each was constructed from 11 pieces of limestone. They are 25 ft (7.6 m) long, 12 ft (3.7 m) tall, and weigh 30 tons.

These were immortalised in the following Welsh rhyme by the bard John Evans (1826–1888), who was born in nearby Menai Bridge:

Pedwar llew tew
Heb ddim blew
Dau 'ochr yma
A dau 'ochr drew

Four fat lions
Without any hair
Two on this side
And two over there

The lions cannot be seen from the A55, which crosses the modern bridge on the same site, although they can be seen from trains on the North Wales Coast Line below. The idea of raising them to road level has been suggested by local campaigners from time to time.

== Fire and reconstruction ==
Britannia Bridge fire
- Date: 23 May 1970
- Location: 53°12′59″N 4°11′9″W
- Type: Structure fire
- Cause: Teenagers playing with torches
- Outcome: Bridge rendered unusable, rebuilt

During the evening of 23 May 1970, the bridge was heavily damaged when boys playing inside the structure dropped a burning torch, setting alight the tar-coated wooden roof of the tubes. Despite the best efforts of the Caernarfonshire and Anglesey fire brigades, the bridge's height, construction, and the lack of an adequate water supply meant they were unable to control the fire, which spread all the way across from the mainland to the Anglesey side. After the fire had burned itself out, the bridge was still standing. However, the structural integrity of the iron tubes had been critically compromised by the intense heat; they had visibly split open at the three towers and had begun to sag. It was recognised that there was still danger of the structure collapsing; the bridge would be unusable until major restorative work was done.

In light of events, the chief civil engineer of British Railways' London Midland region, W.F. Beatty, sought structural advice from consulting engineering company Husband & Co. Following an in-depth investigation of the site performed by the company, it was determined that the cast iron beams inside the towers had suffered substantial cracking and tilting, meaning that the tubes required immediate support at all three towers. The Royal Engineers were quickly brought in to save the bridge, rapidly deploying vertical Bailey bridge units to fill the original jacking slots in the masonry towers. By the end of July 1970, a total of eight Bailey bridge steel towers had been erected, each being capable of bearing a vertical load of around 200 tonnes.

Further analysis showed that the wrought iron tubes had been too badly damaged to be retained. In light of this discovery, it was decided to dismantle the tubes in favour of replacing them with a new deck at the same level as the original tracks. With the exception of the original stone substructure, the structure was completely rebuilt by Cleveland Bridge & Engineering Company. The superstructure of the new bridge was to include two decks: a lower rail deck supported by steel arches and an upper deck constructed out of reinforced concrete, to carry a new road crossing over the strait. Concrete supports were built under the approach spans and steel archways constructed under the long spans on either side of the central Britannia Tower. The two long spans are supported by arches, which had not been an option for the original structure as a result of the clearance needed for tall-masted vessels; modern navigational requirements require much less headroom.

The bridge was rebuilt in stages. The first stage was to erect the new steel arches under the two original wrought-iron tubes. The arches were completed, and single-line working was restored to the railway on 30 January 1972 by reusing one of the tubes. The next stage was to dismantle and remove the other tube and replace it with a concrete deck for the other rail track. Then the single-line working was transferred to the new track (on the west side); this allowed the other tube to be removed and replaced with a concrete deck (which is used only for service access) by 1974. Finally the upper road deck was installed and by July 1980, over 10 years after the fire, the new road crossing was completed, and formally opened by the Prince of Wales, carrying a single-carriageway section of the A5 road (now the A55).

During 2011, national railway infrastructure owner Network Rail, the Welsh Assembly Government and the Highways Agency undertook a £4 million joint programme to strengthen the then 160-year-old structure and improve its reliability. The work involved the replacement of eroded steelwork, repairs to the drainage system, restoration of the parapets and stonework, and the painting of the steel approach portals of the bridge. The programme included a detailed inspection of the internal chambers of the three towers and the construction of a special walkway to enable easier and safer access to the structure for future inspections of the masonry piers; special protective efforts adopted for the work included the use of special pollution-minimising paint and the decontamination of all equipment before being brought onsite.

== Proposed bridge improvement ==
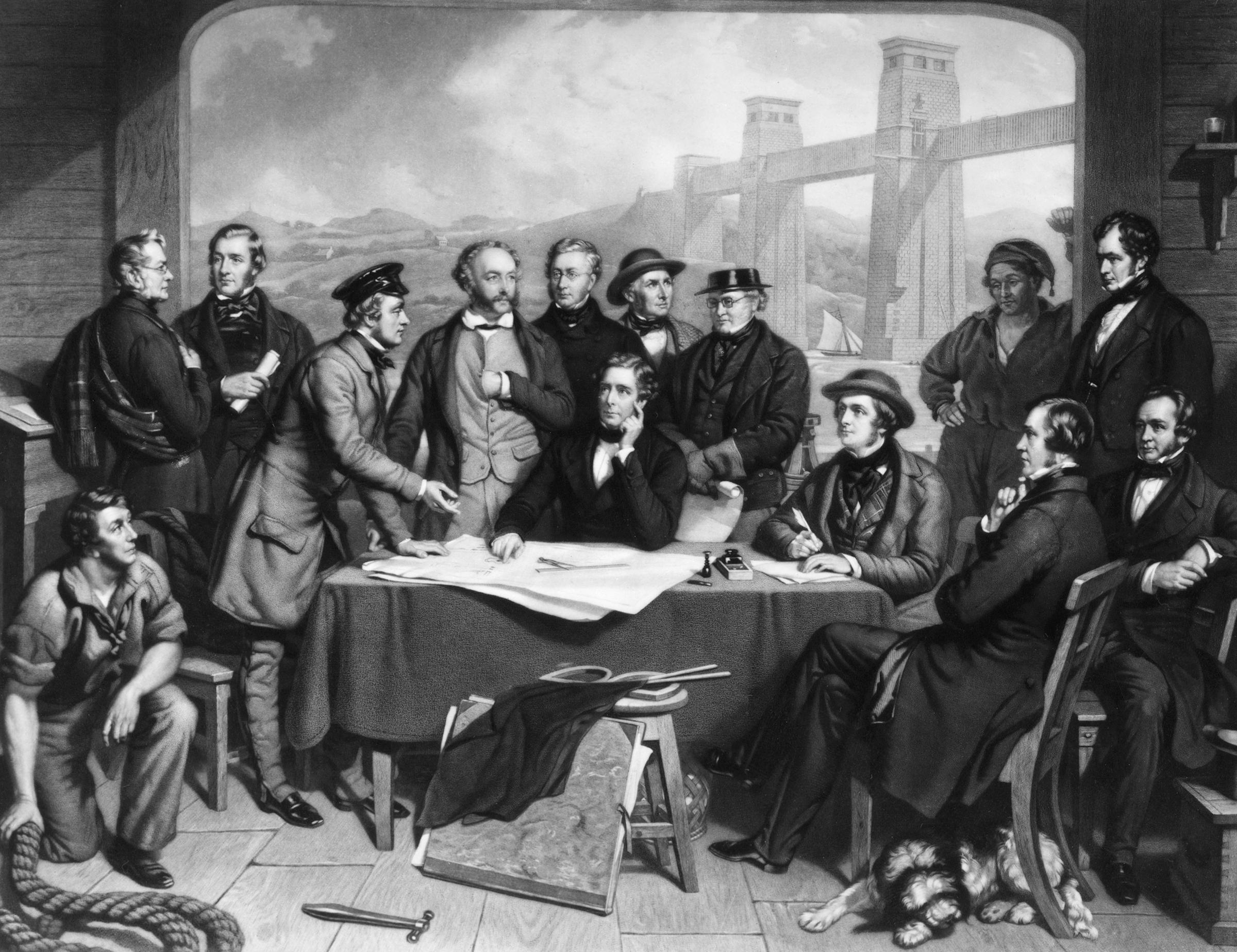
An 1868 engraving showing Robert Stephenson (seated centre) with the engineers who designed and built the Britannia Bridge.

In November 2007, a public consultation exercise into the ‘A55 Britannia Bridge Improvement’ commenced. The perceived problems stated include:

- It is the only non-dual-carriageway section along the A55
- Congestion during morning and afternoon peak periods
- Congestion from seasonal and ferry traffic from Holyhead
- Queuing at the junctions at either end
- Traffic is expected to significantly increase over the next ten years or so

In the document, four options are presented, each with their own pros and cons:

- Do nothing. Congestion will increase as traffic levels increase.
- Widen existing bridge. To do this, the towers would have to be removed to make room for the extra lanes. This is an issue as the bridge is a Grade II listed structure and is owned by Network Rail. The extra lanes would have to be of reduced width as the existing structure is not capable of supporting four full-width lanes.
- New multi-span concrete box bridge alongside. Building a separate bridge would allow the existing bridge to be used as normal during construction. The bridge would require support pillar(s) in the Menai Strait, which is an environmental issue as the strait is a Special Area of Conservation. Visual impact would be low as the pillars and road surface would be aligned with the current bridge.
- New single span cable-stayed bridge. This would eliminate the need for pillars in the Strait, but the bridge would have a large impact on the landscape due to the height of the cable support pillars. This is also the most costly option.

Respondents were overwhelmingly in favour of seeing some improvements, with 70 per cent favouring the solution of building another bridge.

== Similar bridges ==
Very few other tubular iron bridges were ever built since more economical bridge designs were soon developed. The most notable of the other tubular bridges were Stephenson's Conwy Railway Bridge between Llandudno Junction and Conwy, the first Sainte-Anne-de-Bellevue (Québec) Grand Trunk Railway bridge, which was the prototype of the Victoria Bridge across the Saint Lawrence River at Montreal.

The Conwy railway bridge remains in use, and is the only remaining tubular bridge; however, intermediate piers have been added to strengthen it. The bridge can be seen at close quarters from Thomas Telford's adjacent 1826 Conwy Suspension Bridge.

The Victoria Bridge was the first bridge to cross the St. Lawrence River, and was the longest bridge in the world when it was completed in 1859. It was rebuilt as a truss bridge in 1898.

== See also ==
- List of bridges in Wales
- Menai Heritage Bridges Exhibition, museum about the Menai and Britannia bridges
