= Eaton Hodgkinson =

British engineer

Eaton Hodgkinson FRS
- Born: 26 February 1789; Anderton, Northwich, Cheshire, England
- Died: 18 June 1861 (aged 72); Higher Broughton, Salford, Lancashire, England
- Occupation: Engineer

Eaton Hodgkinson (26 February 1789 – 18 June 1861) was an English engineer, a pioneer of the application of mathematics to problems of structural design.

== Early life ==
Hodgkinson was born in the village of Anderton, near Northwich, Cheshire, to a farming family. His father died when he was six years old, and he was raised with his two sisters by his mother, who maintained the farming business. He went to Witton Grammar School in Northwich where he studied the classics to prepare for a career in the Church of England. The regime was unsuited to his tastes and talents which were already showing promise in mathematics. His mother moved him to a less prestigious private school in Northwich where his enthusiasm for mathematics was encouraged and fostered but, as the young Hodgkinson grew physically, he became indispensable on the family farm and soon left education to devote himself there.

Farming was no more to his taste than Greek and Latin and his mother yearned to satisfy her son's appetites. Family friends advised that Hodgkinson might find some more suitable outlet in nearby Manchester and so, in 1811, the family left for Salford to open a pawnbroking business. Hodgkinson used all his spare time in reading science and mathematics and soon introduced himself into Manchester's scientific community, meeting, among others, his future collaborator, Sir William Fairbairn. He became a pupil of John Dalton, studying mathematics, and the two remained firm friends until Dalton's death in 1844. He retired early from the family business to devote a modest pension to his scientific work.

He married twice, to Catherine Johns and to a Miss Holditch. There were no children.

== Scientific work ==
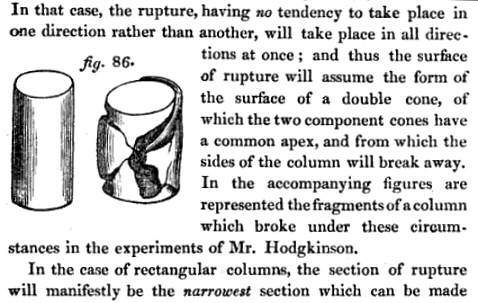
Hodgkinson experimented on the strength of columns, here showing the failure mode

Hodgkinson measured the strength of columns of materials including cast iron and marble in a series of experiments.

Hodgkinson worked with Sir William Fairbairn in Manchester on the design of iron beams, especially on the Water Street bridge for the Liverpool and Manchester Railway in 1828–30. His improved cross section was published by the Manchester Literary and Philosophical Society in 1830 and influenced much nineteenth century structural engineering. He derived the empirical formula for a concentrated load, W (in tons), at which a beam will fail as a function of its length between simple supports, L (in inches); its depth, d (in inches); and its bottom-flange area, A (inch²):

$$W=\frac {26Ad} {L}$$

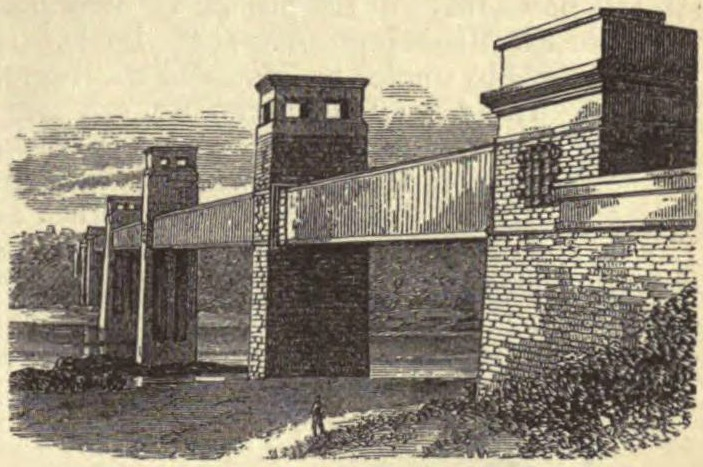
Britannia Bridge, showing the unused holes for the suspension chains that were never needed.

His expertise with beams led to his retention, along with Fairbairn, as consultant on the novel tubular design for the Britannia Bridge. Fairbairn built and tested several prototypes, and developed the final form adopted for the bridge. Both Hodgkinson and Robert Stephenson believed that extra chains would be needed to support the heavy spans, so the towers were built with spaces for the chains. Fairbairn, however, insisted that chains would not be necessary, and his opinion prevailed. He was right, and chains were never used, but the towers remain with their empty recesses.

== Later years ==
Hodgkinson was elected a Fellow of the Royal Society in 1841 and, in 1847, he became professor of the mechanical principles of engineering at University College London. In 1849, he was appointed by the UK Parliament to participate in a Royal Commission to investigate the application of iron in railroad structures, performing some early investigations of metal fatigue.

Towards the end of his life, his mental faculties failed and he died at Higher Broughton, Salford.

== See also ==
- Box girder
- Cylinder stress

== Bibliography ==
- Report of the Commissioners Appointed to Enquire into the Application of Iron to Railway Structures (1849) cmd. 1123, HMSO
- Petroski, H. (1994) Design Paradigms: Case Histories of Error and Judgement in Engineering ISBN 0-521-46108-1
- Rawson, R (1865) "Memoir of Eaton Hodgkinson", Transactions of the Manchester Literary and Philosophical Society, vol II, reprinted in Annual Report of the Smithsonian Institution (1868), pp203–230
- Timoshenko, S. P. (1953) History of Strength of Materials, pp126–129

Professional and academic associations
Preceded by Edward Holme	President of the Manchester Literary and Philosophical Society; 1848–50	Succeeded by John Moore
