= Listed buildings in South Leverton =

South Leverton is a civil parish in the Bassetlaw District of Nottinghamshire, England. The parish contains twelve listed buildings that are recorded in the National Heritage List for England. Of these, one is listed at Grade II*, the middle of the three grades, and the others are at Grade II, the lowest grade. The parish contains the village of South Leverton and the surrounding area. All the listed buildings are in the village, and consist of churches, houses, farmhouses and farm buildings.

== Key ==
Grade	Criteria
II*	Particularly important buildings of more than special interest
II	Buildings of national importance and special interest

== Buildings ==
Name and location	Photograph	Date	Notes	Grade
All Saints' Church; 53.32115°N 0.82545°W		12th century	The church has been altered and extended through the centuries, the chancel was restored in 1868–69 by Ewan Christian, and the rest of the church in 1897–98. It is built in stone with slate roofs, and consists of a nave, north and south aisles, a south porch, a chancel, a vestry and a west tower. The tower has three stages, a chamfered plinth, two string courses, an eaves band and an embattled parapet. On the west side is a blocked square-headed window with a moulded surround, a lancet window, a round-headed window and a clock face, and the top stage contains round-headed openings with colonnettes containing round-headed bell openings. The south doorway dates from the 12th century and has two orders, and chevron decoration.	II*
Green Cottage; 53.32088°N 0.82048°W		17th century	The cottage has a timber-framed core with brick nogging, it is clad in brick, rendered and colourwashed, on a brick plinth, with dentilled eaves and a pantile roof. There are two storeys, four bays, and a small rear outshut. On the west front is a doorway and casement and horizontally-sliding sash windows, and on the south gable end is a canted bay window with a flat roof.	II
Meeting House; 53.31780°N 0.82777°W		17th century	A Friends' meeting house, later a private house, it is in brick with some chequerwork and diapering, a floor band, cogged eaves, and a roof of tile and corrugated sheeting. There are two storeys and an L-shaped plan, with a front range of two bays, and a rear wing. The windows are a mix of casements and horizontally-sliding sashes, and the entrance is through a porch in an angle at the rear.	II
Diamond House; 53.32095°N 0.82621°W		1691	A school, later a private house, in brick with stone dressings, a floor band, cogged and dentilled eaves, and a pantile roof with coped tumbled gables. There are two storeys, three bays and a double-range plan. In the centre is a recessed doorway with a fanlight and a keystone on a cornice, and above it is a detached segmental pediment. The windows are sashes, and all the openings have rubbed brick heads. To the right is a projecting single-bay extension with a flat roof.	II
The Old Dovecote; 53.32158°N 0.82645°W		Mid 18th century	The pigeoncote, which has been converted into a house, is in brick, with cogged eaves, an eaves band, and roofs of tile and pantile with crowstepped gables. There are three storeys and attics, two bays, a continuous rear outshut, and a single-storey single-bay porch to the left. On the building are alighting shelves, and the windows are a mix of casements and horizontally-sliding sashes.	II
The Barn; 53.31780°N 0.82746°W		Late 18th century	The barn, which has been converted for residential use, is in brick, with cogged eaves, an eaves band in the east gable, and a pantile roof with coped gables and kneelers. The openings include various doorways, slit vents, and vents in diamond patterns.	II
Holly Farm House; 53.32045°N 0.81871°W	—	c. 1780	The farmhouse is in brick with a floor band, cogged and dentilled eaves, and a pantile roof with coped tumbled gables. There are two storeys, three bays and a continuous rear outshut. In the centre is a doorway with a reeded surround, it is flanked by flat-roofed bay windows, and in the upper floor are sash windows, the middle one with a round head.	II
New Farm House and The Stables; 53.32129°N 0.81729°W		c. 1790	The farmhouse is in brick on a plinth, with floor and eaves bands, rendered eaves, and a slate roof. There are two storeys and attics, and an L-shaped plan with a front range of four bays. On the front is a doorway and a blocked doorway to the right, sash windows in the outer bays, and blocked windows in the middle two bays in the upper floor. The stable dates from the 19th century, and is in brick with cogged eaves, a pantile roof, two storeys and three bays. There are external stairs, and it contains a stable door, a window with a segmental head, casement windows and horizontally-sliding sash windows.	II
Two Centuries Barn; 53.32149°N 0.81752°W	—	1791	A barn and a pigeoncote in brick, with dentilled eaves and a pantile roof. There are two storeys and four plus one bays. The buildings contain doorways and vents, and the pigeoncote has shelves.	II
Outbuilding north of The Priory; 53.32212°N 0.82759°W	—	Early 19th century	The outbuilding is in brick with a pantile roof, a single storey and five bays. The doorways have pilasters and pediments, and all the openings have four-centred arched heads. One window is a casement with Y-tracery and a pediment.	II
Methodist Chapel; 53.31990°N 0.82587°W		1847	The chapel is in brick on a plinth, with a hipped slate roof. There is a single storey and four bays. The middle two bays contain round-headed sash windows, and above them is a datestone. The outer bays have round-headed recesses containing plaques, and projecting are flat-roofed porches on chamfered plinths, each with a moulded frieze, a cornice, and three doorways with fanlights. On each side is a central round-headed recess flanked by segmental-headed recesses containing round-headed sash windows.	II
The Beeches; 53.32185°N 0.82760°W	—	Early 19th century	A house, formerly The Priory, which incorporates earlier material, and later used for other purposes. It is in stone and brick, and has roofs in pantile and slate with coped gables and kneelers. There are two storeys and attics and an L-shaped plan, with a main range of six bays. Most of the windows are lancets, some double or triple, and there are also casements and sashes, some with segmental heads, bay windows and a French window.	II
