= Listed buildings in Cottam, Nottinghamshire =

Cottam is a civil parish in the Bassetlaw District of Nottinghamshire, England. The parish contains two listed buildings that are recorded in the National Heritage List for England. Both the listed buildings are designated at Grade II, the lowest of the three grades, which is applied to "buildings of national importance and special interest". The parish contains the village of Cottam and the surrounding area, and the listed buildings consist of a church and a font in the churchyard.

== Buildings ==
Name and location	Photograph	Date	Notes
Holy Trinity Church; 53.31130°N 0.77327°W		12th century	The church, later used for other purposes, has been altered through the centuries. It was restored in 1868–69, and again in 1890 when the bell turret was added. The church is built in stone with a slate roof, and consists of a nave and a chancel under a continuous roof, a south porch, and a bell turret on the west gable. The doorway is Norman, with two orders, one with colonnettes, and the voussoirs have chevron decoration.
Font in churchyard 53.31125°N 0.77318°W	—	14th century	The font is in the churchyard of Holy Trinity Church. It is in stone, and consists of a bowl on an octagonal stem with an inscribed base.
