= Torksey railway station =

Former railway station in Lincolnshire, England

Coordinates: 53.3006°N 0.7364°W

Torksey
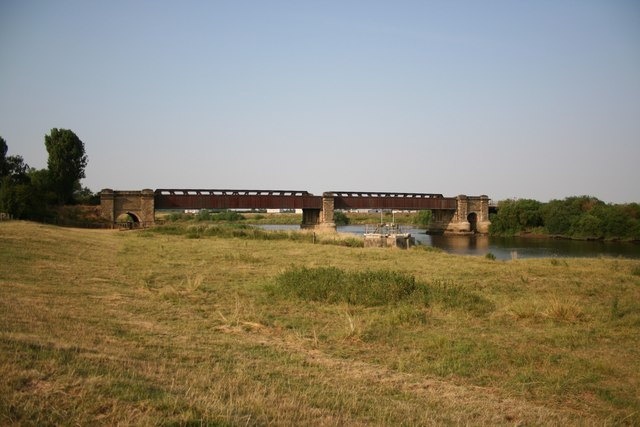
- The line crossed the River Trent about 600 yards west of the station

General information
- Location: Torksey, Lincolnshire; England
- Platforms: 2

Other information
- Status: Disused

History
- Original company: Manchester, Sheffield and Lincolnshire Railway
- Pre-grouping: Great Central Railway
- Post-grouping: LNER

Key dates
- Dec 1850: Station opened
- 2 November 1959: Station closed
Location

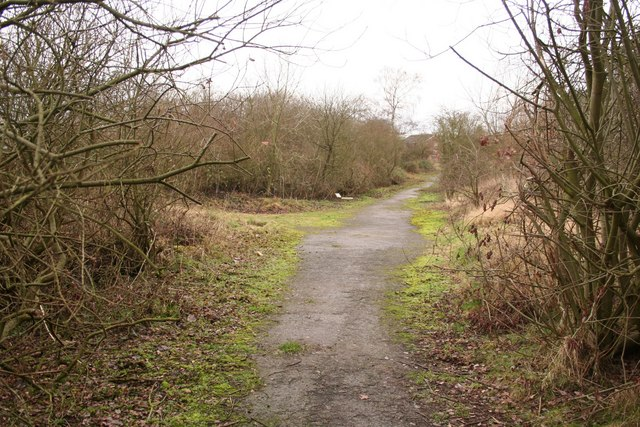
Looking along the former trackbed into the site of the station

Torksey railway station was a station in Torksey, Lincolnshire on the line between Lincoln and Retford. It closed to passengers in 1959, but part of the line remained in use for freight traffic (serving a nearby oil distribution depot) until 1 June 1988. Torksey Viaduct remains as a Grade II Listed Structure.

Preceding station	Disused railways	Following station
Cottam	Great Central Railway; Clarborough Junction-Sykes Junction branch	Saxilby
