= Conwy Suspension Bridge =

Bridge in Conwy, Wales

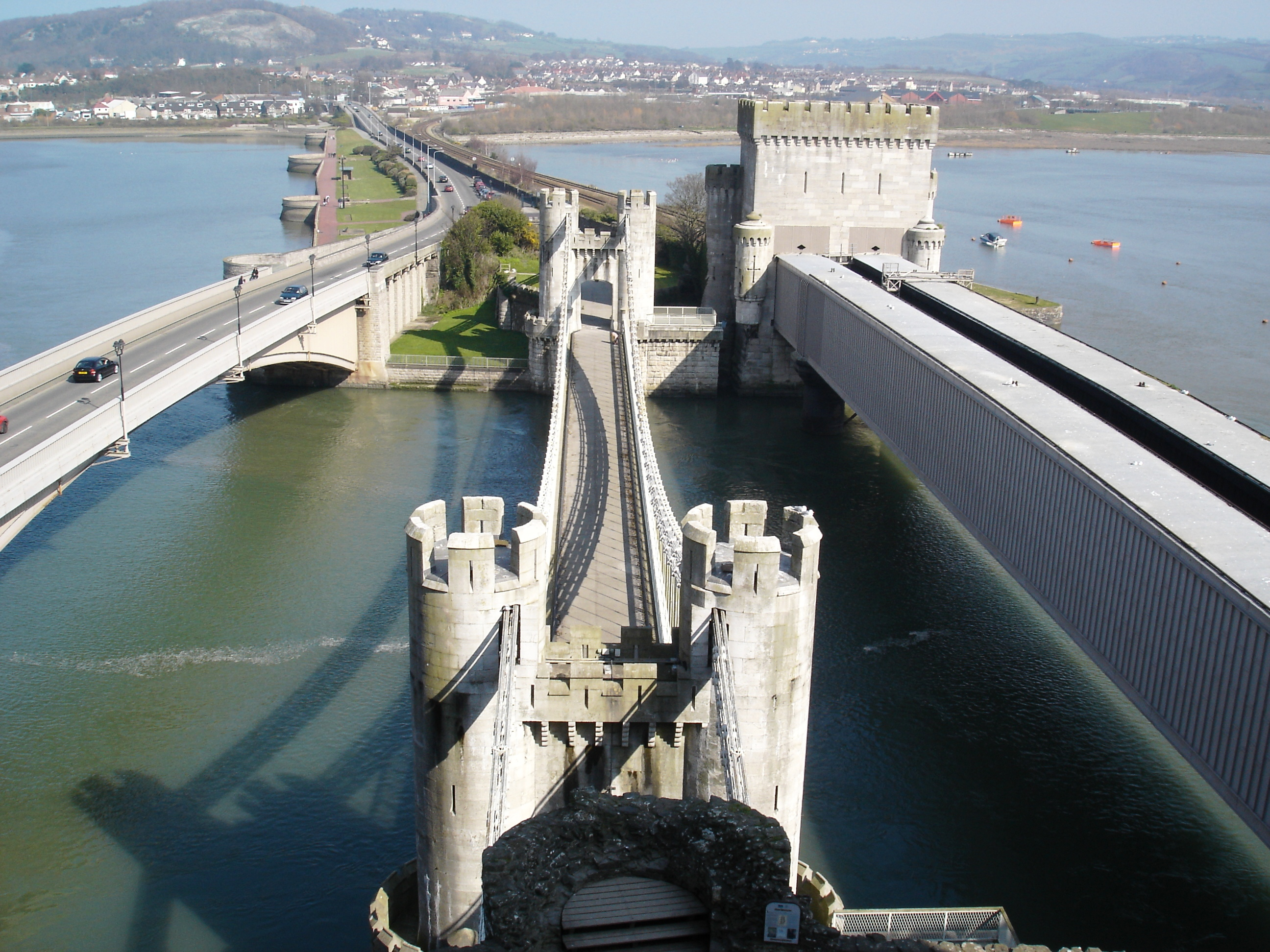
- The bridge as seen from Conwy Castle, with the modern road bridge to the left and the rail bridge to the right
- Coordinates: 53°16′50″N 3°49′26″W
- Carries: Pedestrians
- Crosses: River Conwy
- Locale: Conwy

History
- Constructed by: Thomas Telford
- Construction start: 1822
- Construction end: 1826

Location
- Interactive map of Conwy Suspension Bridge

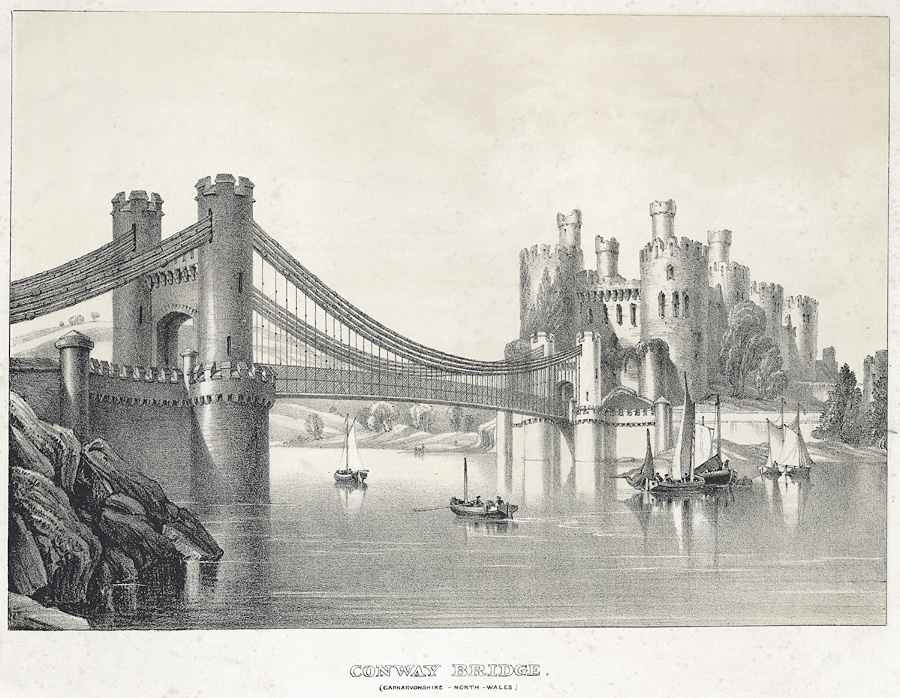
Conway Bridge c.1840, before the construction of Stephenson's tubular Bridge

The Conwy Suspension Bridge is a Grade I-listed structure and is one of the first road suspension bridges in the world. Located in the medieval town of Conwy in Conwy county borough, North Wales, it is now only passable on foot. The bridge is now in the care of the National Trust. It originally carried the A55(T) road from Chester to Bangor.

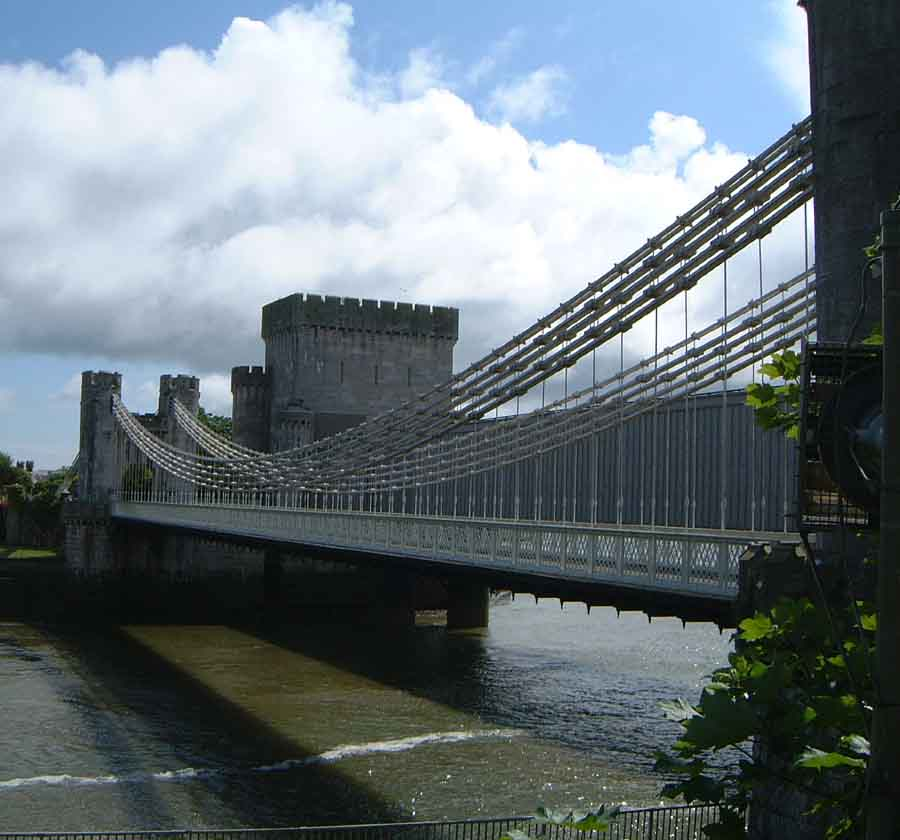
Conwy suspension bridge

== History ==
Built by Thomas Telford, the 99.5-metre-long (326 ft) suspension bridge spans the River Conwy next to Conwy Castle, a World Heritage Site. The bridge was built between 1822–1826 at a cost of £51,000 (equivalent to £5,700,000 in 2024) and replaced the ferry at the same point. It is in the same style as one of Telford's other bridges, the Menai Suspension Bridge crossing the Menai Strait. The original wooden deck was replaced by an iron roadway in the late nineteenth century and it was strengthened by adding wire cables above the original iron chains in 1903. The following year a six-foot-wide (1.8 m) walkway was added for pedestrian traffic. The bridge was superseded by a new road bridge built alongside and closed on 13 December 1958 when Henry Brooke, the Minister of Welsh Affairs, performed the opening ceremony of the new bridge. The suspension bridge is now only used as a permissive path, granted by the National Trust who have owned the bridge since 1965.

== Description ==
Telford designed the bridge to be sympathetic to the adjacent Conwy Castle. The bridge deck is suspended by four tiers of two chains each (a fifth tier of cables was added later) carried over castellated towers that have a central archway over the road with machicolation. The chains are anchored on the east side of the river by a freestone and concrete plinth while those on the western side are anchored to the eastern barbican of the castle and bedrock. Part of the castle had to be demolished during construction to anchor the suspension cables.

== See also ==
- Conwy Railway Bridge
- List of bridges in Wales
