= Tubular bridge =

Bridge that carries traffic in a rigid box girder section

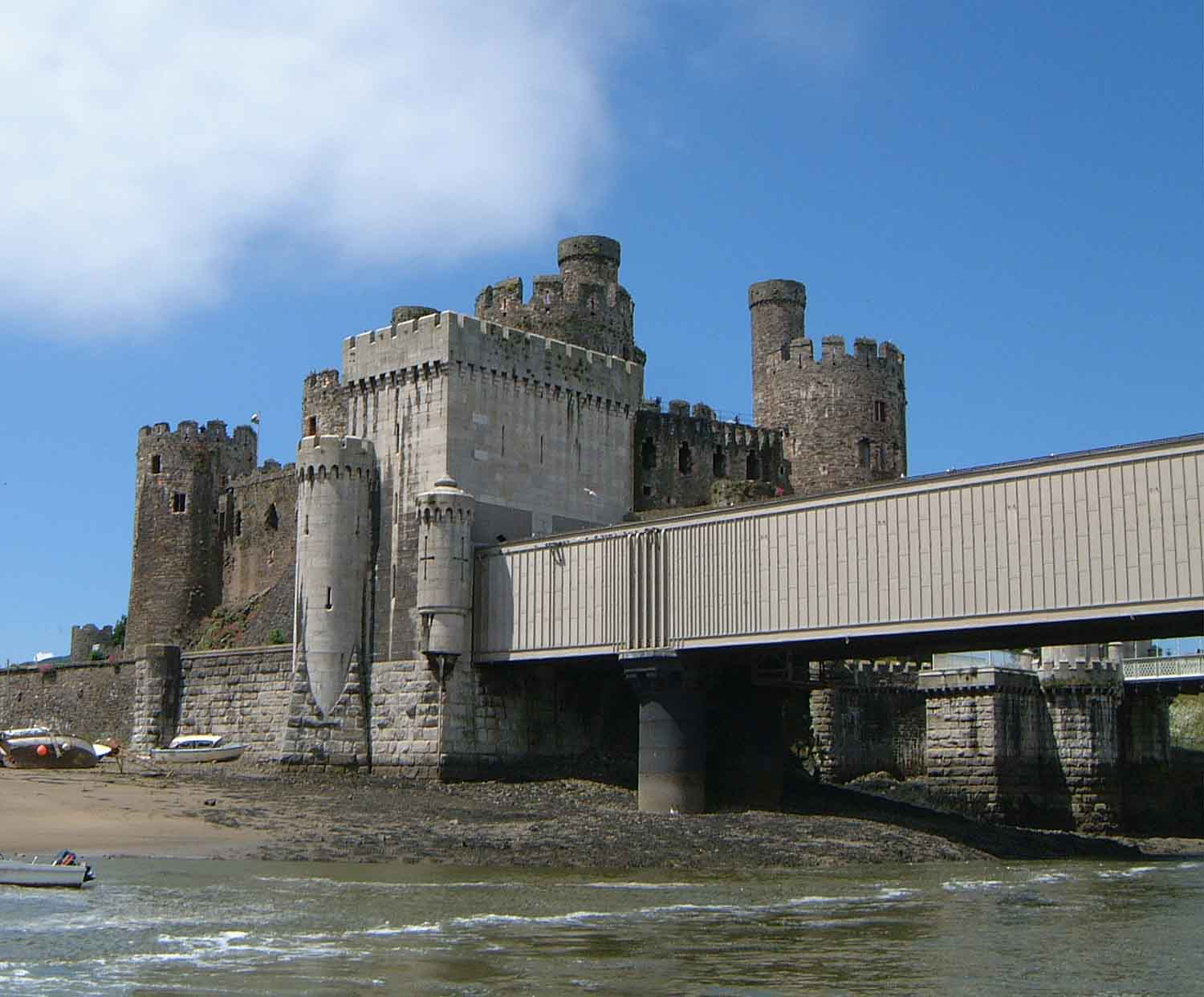
- Conwy Railway Bridge
- Span range: Medium
- Material: Wrought iron
- Movable: No
- Design effort: Very high
- Falsework required: Depends upon length and degree of prefabrication

A tubular bridge is a bridge built as a rigid box-girder section within which the traffic is carried. Famous examples include the original Britannia Bridge over the Menai Strait, the Conwy railway bridge over the River Conwy, designed and tested by William Fairbairn and built by Robert Stephenson between 1846 and 1850, and the original Victoria Bridge in Montreal.

== Conwy and Britannia Bridges ==
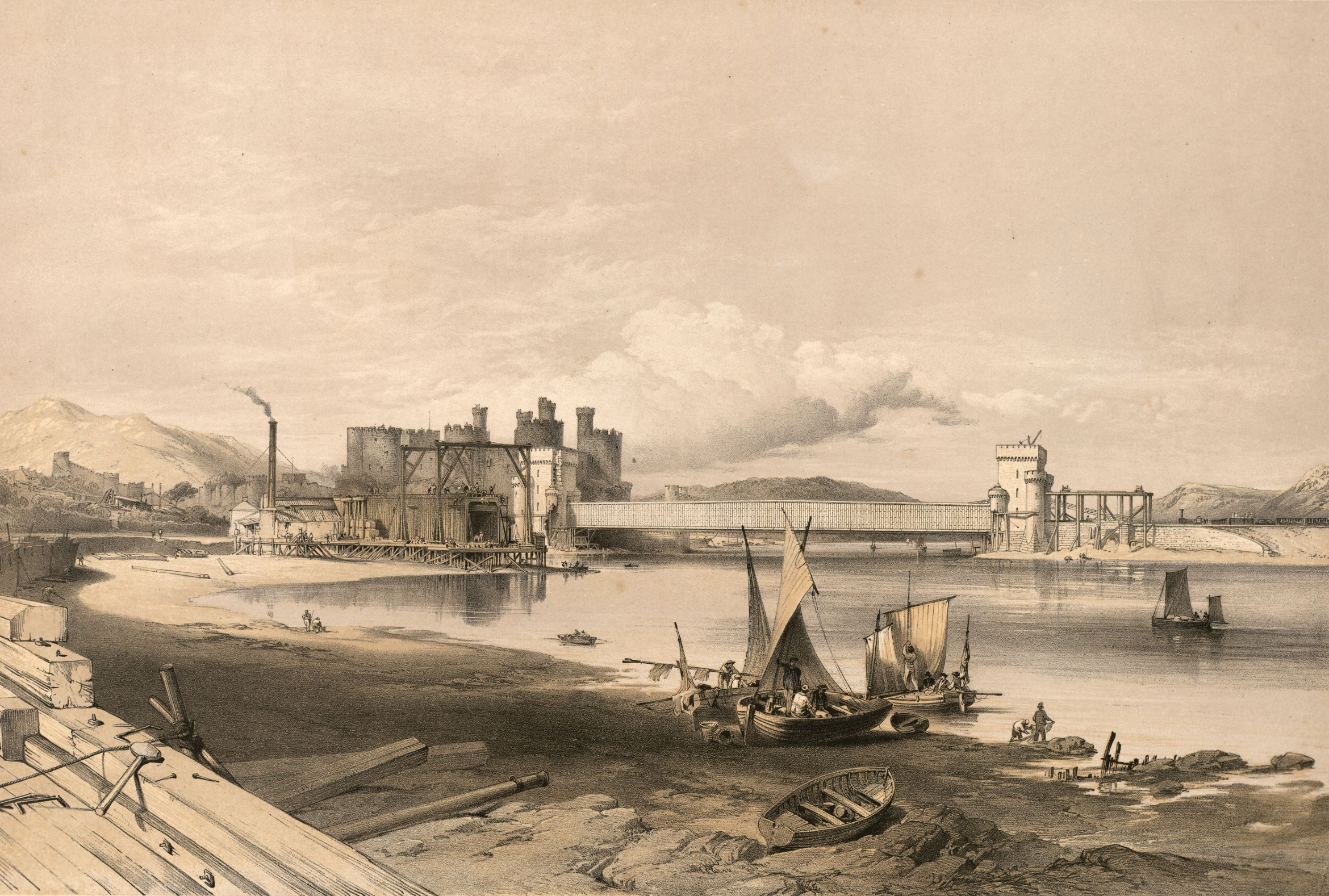
Conwy Bridge.Construction of second tube, September, 1848

The Conwy railway bridge carries the North Wales coast railway line across the River Conwy between Llandudno Junction and the town of Conwy. The wrought-iron tubular bridge was built by Robert Stephenson to a design by William Fairbairn and is similar in construction to Stephenson's other famous tubular bridge, the Britannia Bridge across the Menai Strait. It was completed in 1848 and officially opened in 1849. Being the first tubular bridge to be built, the design needed much testing on prototypes to confirm that it would be capable of carrying heavy locomotives. The testing was performed by Fairbairn. The successful result enabled the much-larger Britannia Bridge to be built. The current Conwy bridge has been reinforced by extra columns under the bridge into the river but is otherwise virtually unchanged since it was built.

Before the Britannia Bridge was constructed, Fairbairn conducted "the most celebrated of all engineering experiments on the grand scale", a series of experiments "of a gigantic character". One-sixth scale models, 78 feet (24 m) long, were built at Fairbairn's Millwall Iron Works and tested with increasing loads. By this means, although at an experimental cost of thousands of pounds, the design of the cellular girder was refined until it could carry loads of 2.4 times the original capacity. The most significant finding was that of a thin section's susceptibility to buckling under compression loads and the cellular girder's resistance to this. Stephenson would build around a thousand other bridges using this cellular structure. The most impressive test was performed on-site at Conwy. The 1300-ton tubular girder, deflecting 8 inches (200 mm) under its own weight, was loaded with a further 300 tons and the deflection measured. The effects of wind loading and asymmetric thermal expansion due to sunlight were also studied.

== Other bridges ==
The unconventional nature of the tubular girder bridge was not widely accepted. John Fowler's 1847 tubular girder design for Torksey Viaduct used tubes that were only 10 feet (3.0 m) high and placed the railway deck between them, rather than inside. This is now considered as the first box-girder bridge, rather than a pure tubular bridge. Despite this, it was initially rejected after completion by the Board of Trade’s inspector, Captain Lintorn Simmons, and the design was also criticized by the Institution of Civil Engineers. When the bridge was strengthened in 1897, this was done by added a central truss above the deck rather than by strengthening the box.

== Legacy ==
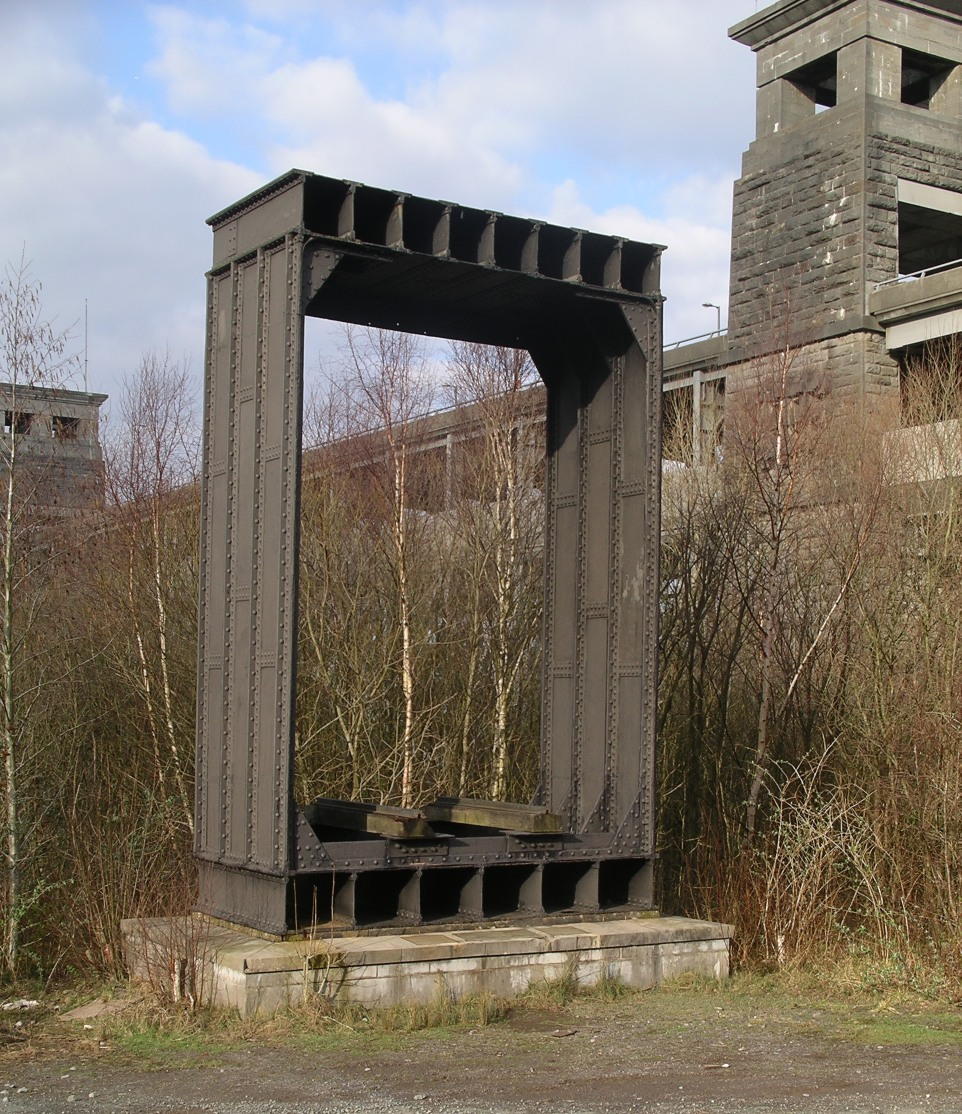
Section of the original wrought-iron tubular Britannia Bridge standing in front of the modern bridge

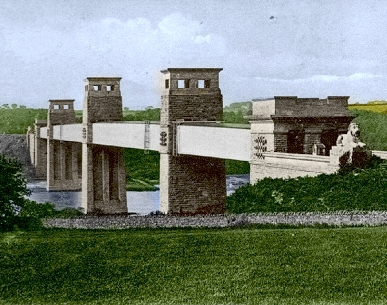
Original Britannia Bridge

Since the destruction by fire of Britannia Bridge in 1970, Conwy railway bridge remains the only surviving example of this means of construction undertaken by Stephenson.

In the case of the Britannia Bridge, this technology allowed a bridge with spans up to 460 feet (140 m) long to be constructed, when until then the longest wrought iron span had been 31.5 feet (9.6 m).

== See also ==
- Box girder bridge – a similar bridge that carries the traffic outside the box
- Covered bridge – a type which may employ a variety of structures but which also encloses the traffic (for the protection of the bridge)
- Fairbairn crane – a design of curved crane jib, with a similar doubled-walled inner face to resist compression forces
- Jetway – a movable bridge that carries pedestrians from a terminal to an aircraft
- Skyway – a bridge connecting buildings at an elevation above the ground
