= Cottam, Nottinghamshire =

Coordinates: 53.310°N 0.774°W

Cottam
- Civil parish
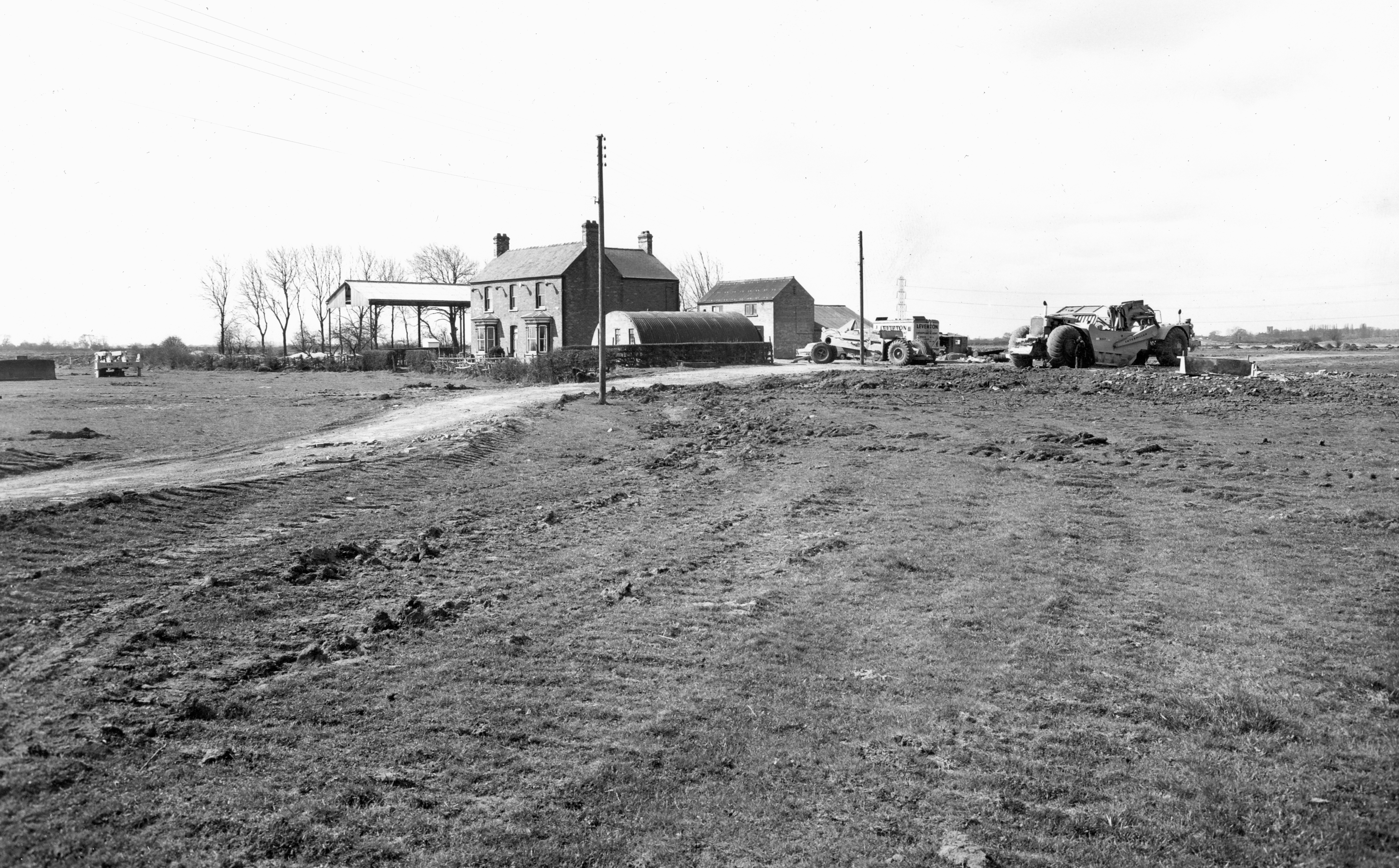
- Mickleholme Farm prior to demolition in 1964

- Location within Nottinghamshire
- Interactive map of Cottam
- Area: 0.98 sq mi (2.5 km^{2})
- Population: 97 (2021)
  - Density: 99/sq mi (38/km^{2})
- OS grid reference: SK 818798
  - London: 125 mi (201 km) SE
- District: Bassetlaw
- Shire county: Nottinghamshire
- Region: East Midlands
- Country: England
- Sovereign state: United Kingdom
- Post town: Retford
- Postcode district: DN22
- Dialling code: 01777
- Police: Nottinghamshire
- Fire: Nottinghamshire
- Ambulance: East Midlands
- UK Parliament: Bassetlaw

Cottam (/kɒtəm/; "Cotum" locally) is a village and civil parish in Nottinghamshire 8 miles east of Retford within the Bassetlaw district.

The population of the civil parish in the 2011 Census was given as 108, this fell to 97 in 2021. To the south of the village once stood the Cottam Power Station, built between 1964 and 1968, and demolished in 2025. Cottam is also close to Sundown Adventureland.

== History ==
Cottam is described in the Domesday Book of 1086 as comprising 8 households. Its Lord was Hardwulf of Cottam (also spelt Hardulf, Hardul and Heardwulf) before the Conquest and Fulco of Lisors after the Conquest. The tenant in chief in 1086 was Roger de Bully (Roger de Busli), who was given extensive lands in Nottinghamshire, Derbyshire and the Strafforth wapentake of Yorkshire that had previously belonged to a variety of Anglo-Saxon and Scandinavian Lords. Fulco of Lisors was known as 'Roger's Man' and was an important tenant of Roger of Bully. He was a witness of Roger of Bully's charter founding his priory of Blyth, as well as a donor of lands. His wife was called Albreda, and they had a son, Robert.

Cottam was spelt 'Cotum' in 1280 but this is likely a literal spelling of the way the name is pronounced locally to this day.

In 1636, a widow of Cottam was prosecuted for being a ‘popish’ (Roman Catholic) recusant.

In White's Directory of 1844, Cottam was described as having 18 houses and 89 inhabitants. The population was unchanged in 1851.

In 1848, Cottam was described by Lewis as: "a small village and a township in South Leverton parish, Notts, on the M.S. & L.R., near the river Trent, 7¼miles E by S of East Retford, with a station on the railway, and a post office under Lincoln; money order office, Rampton; telegraph office, Sturton-le-Steeple. Acreage, 599; population, 81. The living is a vicarage, annexed to that of Littleborough, in the diocese of Southwell; joint gross value, £165. The church is small and has a Norman doorway. There is also a Wesleyan chapel".

Wilson was unimpressed by Cottam, describing its church as "small and plain". He commented that at that time (1872) it had a railway station, comprised 19 houses and had a population of 86. The property value was £814.

The station mentioned by Lewis and Wilson (Cottam railway station) was demolished and the line closed between Clarborough Junction and Sykes Junction to passenger traffic in 1959. However, the line was kept open from the West to enable merry-go-round coal trains to Cottam Power Station.

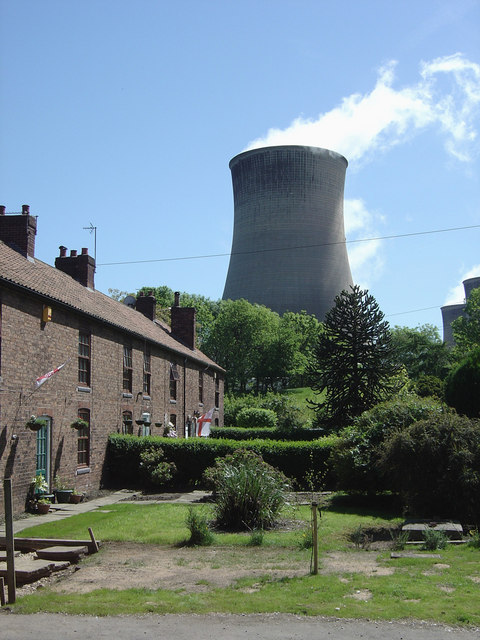
Cottages in Cottam, showing a now-demolished cooling tower of Cottam Power Station

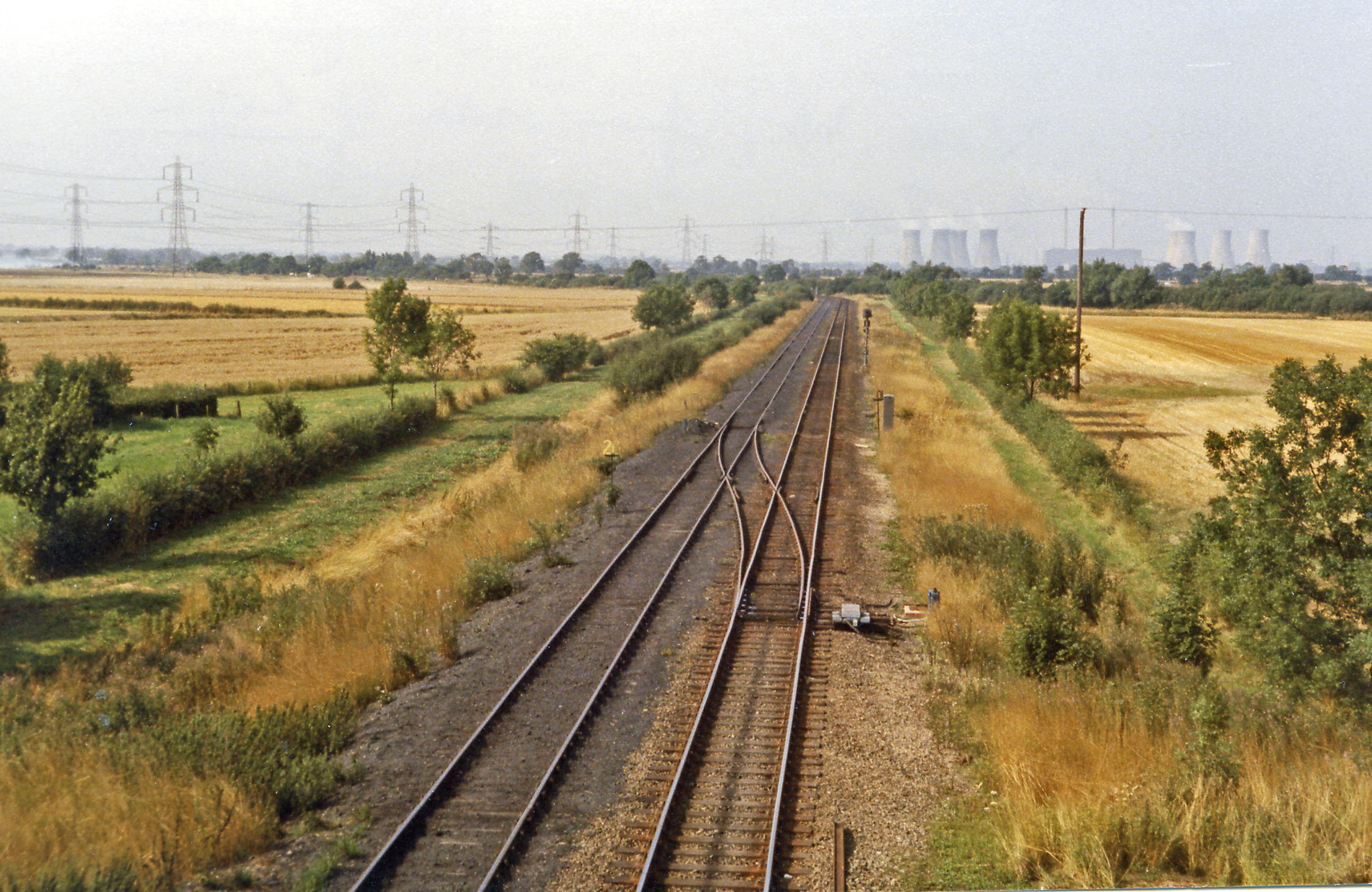
The site of the former Cottam Station, closed in 1959

Cottam's population had grown to 107 by 1887.

Cottam village was described in 1938 as:

"Its few houses line one side of the road and look over meadows stretching nearly a mile to the Trent, dividing Notts from Lincolnshire; and its tiny church, guarding a precious doorway of 800 years, hides from all who hurry by. A lychgate at the end of a wayside path brings us to the simple building, with walls aslant, nave and chancel under one steep roof on four massive old beams, and a turret for one bell. A porch shelters the Norman doorway, which has crude chevron mouldings boldly carved, and pillars on each side with scalloped capitals. The bowl of the ancient font is outside the porch, set on a new base."

— The King's England by Arthur Mee: Nottinghamshire: The Midland Stronghold

Cottam power stations were built in 1964 on the land of the former Mickleholme Farm which was demolished. The power plants have been said to have an overbearing quality on the village by many, but some commentators have praised the modernist aesthetic of the towers and are not happy about the demolition of the 8 cooling towers in August 2025; electricity generation ceased in September 2019. Hilary Sylvester of Nottingham Civic Society's said of Nottinghamshire's Power Stations: "They provide a point in the landscape. People probably did not want them when they were first built but they've been there for so long they are a feature. Putting a building in the landscape doesn't necessarily ruin it, and an industrial building doesn't have to be awful."

=== Historic buildings and archaeology ===
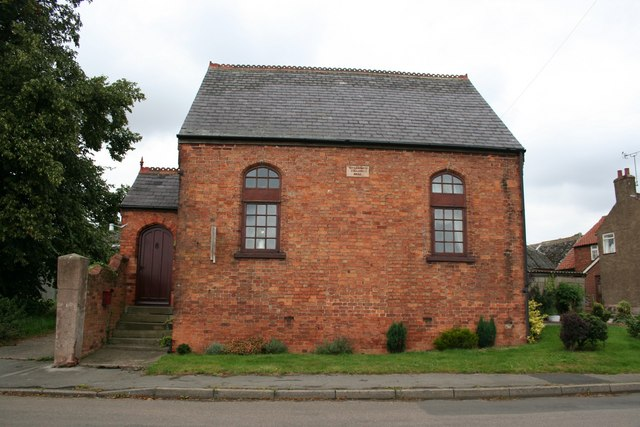
Former Wesleyan Chapel in Cottam Village, Nottinghamshire

Bassetlaw Council has placed much of Cottam within an area of Archaeological interest, noting: "Recognising the overall high potential for the survival of below-ground archaeology in certain parts of both Treswell and Cottom [sic], Bassetlaw District Council has identified a number of areas within the parish as Areas of Archaeological Interest."

==== The Church of the Holy Trinity ====
The Church of the Holy Trinity is a Grade II listed building (1967), which dates from the 12th century. It was restored in 1869 and again in 1890. Its listing describes it as being built of coursed rubble and dressed stone, with ashlar quoins and dressings, and a slate roof. It has a single bellcote that dates from 1890. There was a single bell hung in the bellcote that had the following inscription: 'GOD SAVE HIS CHVRCH 1704'. Until 1817 there were two bells hung in the bellcote.

The church contains a single war memorial, erected for the fallen of the parish in World War I. The memorial is made of marble and slate. The inscription read: 'This Memorial is Erected by the Parishioners of Cottam, in Proud and Grateful Memory of those from this Parish who fell in the Great War. 1914-18. George Fenton, Frank Howard, William Howard, Percy Kitchen. See that their names are not forgotten.'

The church font is also Grade II listed. Its listing says it dates from the 14th century, is Ashlar and Octagonal. The base is inscribed as follows: "Ancient font presented to Church by Archbishop …, 1918."

The church had a history of problematic priests. In 1538, Sir John Hercy wrote to Thomas Cromwell, begging him to take pity on the ‘poor men of Cottam’ who were threatened by a ‘lunatic priest’. In 1610 the churchwardens’ presentment complained of a minister who failed to read divine service, had allowed his son Euzebius (unlicensed) to expound service and was frequenting alehouses 'in verie scandalous sorte’.

The church was deconsecrated in 2002 and is now a private house.

==== Wesleyan Chapel ====
Cottam also has a former Wesleyan Methodist Chapel, built 1857. The chapel is now a private two-bedroom house.

== Cottam in the news ==
According to the National Crime Agency, a man was found floating in the River Trent in Cottam on 15 July 1987. The body was decomposed but was described by police as being aged between 50 and 60, fair and greying, with stubble and false teeth. He was 178 cm in height and had a stocky build. The man has never been identified, and the investigation remains open (June 2018).

== See also ==
- Listed buildings in Cottam, Nottinghamshire
