= Saxilby railway station =

Railway station in Lincolnshire, England

Saxilby
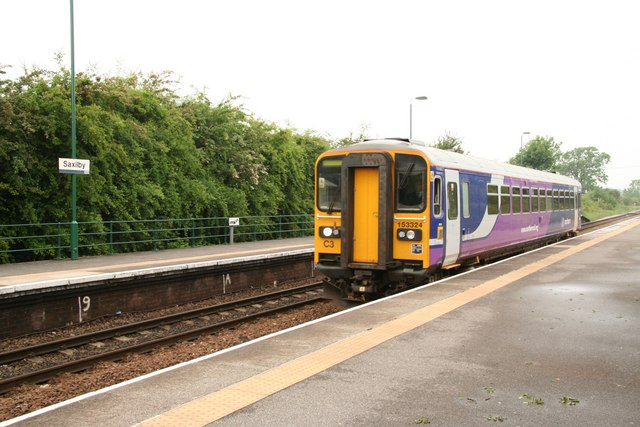
- Northern Rail Class 153 train at Saxilby

General information
- Location: Saxilby, West Lindsey; England
- Coordinates: 53.267°N 0.664°W
- Grid reference: SK892752
- Managed by: East Midlands Railway
- Platforms: 2

Other information
- Station code: SXY
- Classification: DfT category F1

History
- Opened: 9 April 1849

Passengers
- 2020/21: ▼20,848
- 2021/22: ▲69,026
- 2022/23: ▲76,160
- 2023/24: ▲76,254
- 2024/25: ▲93,894
Location
Notes
- Passenger statistics from the Office of Rail and Road

Saxilby railway station serves Saxilby in Lincolnshire, England. The station is on the Sheffield-Lincoln line and the Doncaster-Lincoln Line. It was built by The Great Northern Railway and opened in 1849.

== Facilities ==
The station has two platforms connected by a ramped footbridge over the line, which opened in the summer of 2014. Before the footbridge was built, the platforms were linked by a barrow crossing.

The station house has been converted for private use and is now a private residence and an office. The station is now unstaffed; tickets must be obtained from the ticket machine on the Lincoln platform or bought online.

Facilities are limited to shelters on each platform and a help point and departure board for passenger enquiries and information about oncoming trains. There is bicycle storage and a small car park.

== Services ==
Services at Saxilby are operated by Northern Trains and East Midlands Railway.

On weekdays and Saturdays, the station is generally served by an hourly Northern Trains service between Lincoln and Leeds via Retford and Sheffield. There are also five trains per day between Doncaster and Peterborough via Lincoln and Sleaford, operated by East Midlands Railway.

On Sundays, there is generally an hourly service between Lincoln and Sheffield, with some services continuing to and from Huddersfield. There are no Sunday services to Doncaster or Peterborough.

Preceding station	National Rail	Following station
Gainsborough Lea Road	East Midlands Railway: Doncaster to Lincoln Line; Monday-Saturday only	Lincoln
Gainsborough Lea Road	Northern Trains Sheffield to Lincoln Line	Lincoln
	Historical railways	
Stow Park Line open, station closed	Great Northern and Great Eastern Joint Railway Lincolnshire Loop Line	Skellingthorpe Line open, station closed
Torksey Line and station closed	Great Central Railway Sheffield to Lincoln Line	Lincoln Central Line and station open
