= Checker House railway station =

Former railway station in Nottinghamshire, England

Checker House
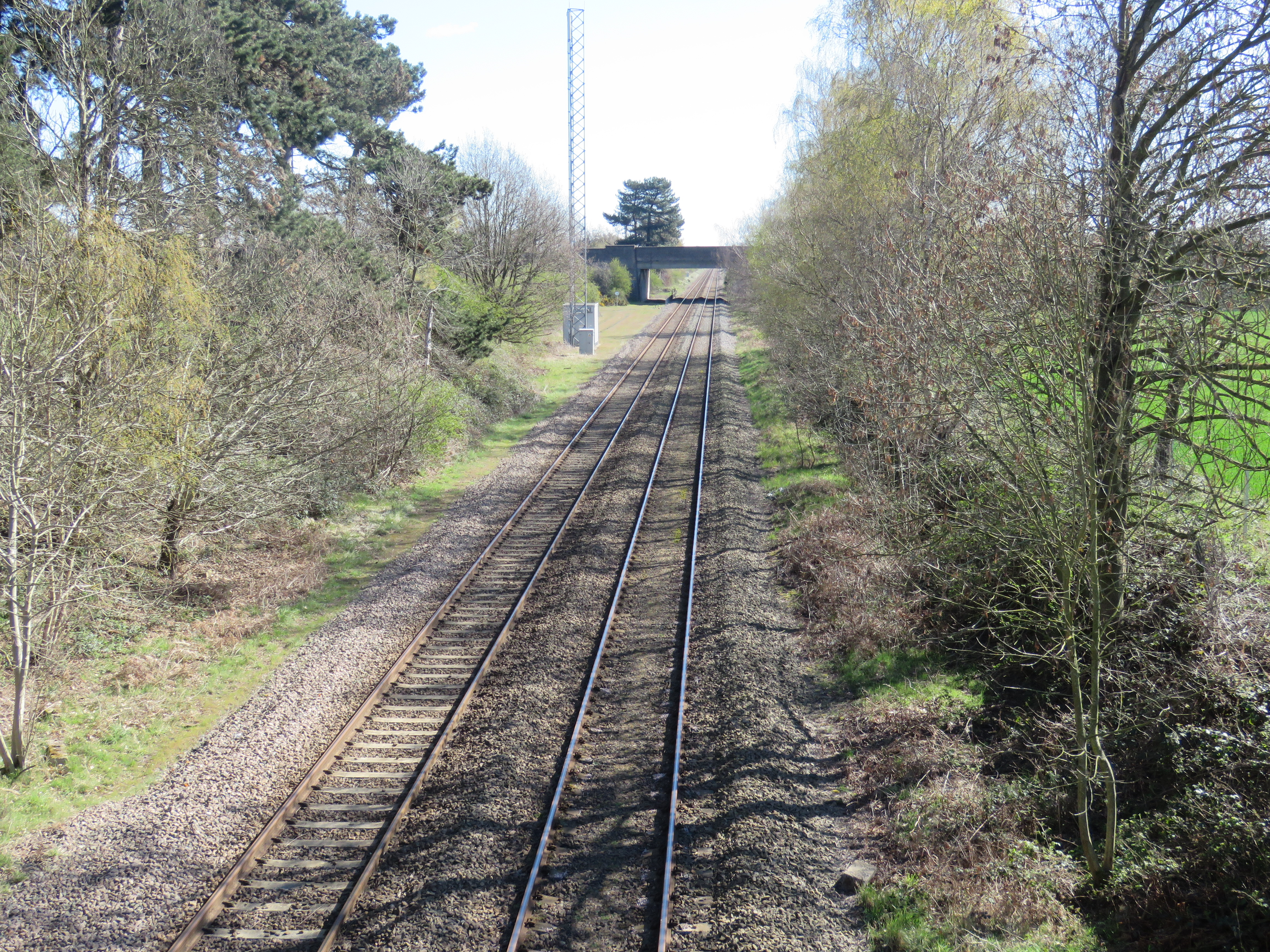
- The site of the goods station looking towards the A1 road bridge, pictured in 2021. Part of it is now overgrown, but part is occupied by a mobile phone mast.

General information
- Location: England
- Coordinates: 53.303133°N 1.031180°W
- Platforms: 2

Other information
- Status: Disused

History
- Original company: Sheffield and Lincolnshire Junction Railway
- Pre-grouping: Great Central Railway
- Post-grouping: London and North Eastern Railway

Key dates
- 1 April 1852: Opened
- 14 September 1931: Closed
Location

Checker House railway station was a station between Retford and Worksop, Nottinghamshire, England which served the village of Ranby from 1852 to 1931. The platforms were immediately to the east of the A1 road, and there was a goods station to the west of the road, which remained open until 1963. The line remains open for services on the Sheffield–Lincoln line but nothing remains of the passenger station or platforms, although part of a loading gauge was still visible in 2021.

The site was included in Bassetlaw District Council's local plan in 2019, as they were considering locations for a garden village development, and the favoured site was immediately to the south of the railway line. If the village is built, it will probably include a station at or near the site of Checker House station, but it may be called Morton.

== History ==
The line between Worksop and Retford opened on 16 July 1849, but did not initially include a station at Checker House, which opened three years later on 1 April 1852. The platforms were immediately to the east of Blyth Road(now the A1 road), which crossed the line at a level crossing. A footbridge enabled pedestrians to cross the line when the crossing gates were closed to road traffic. To the west of the road there was a signal box, with a long trailing siding to the south of the running lines. On the northern side of the tracks were two sidings, with access to the eastbound track at the eastern end, and to both tracks at the western end. To the west of the sidings was a bridge which carried a farmer's track, known as Green Lane, over the railway. By 1899, another trailing siding had been added to the west of Green Lane bridge, on the north side of the running lines.

Between 1908 and 1911, a siding was built between the goods station and the site of Elkesley boreholes, some 3 miles (4.8 km) to the south, and 1 mile (1.6 km) to the south-west of the Great North Road. It was used to deliver all of the equipment required to construct the boreholes, which were built by Ashton Frost and Company for Lincoln Corporation Waterworks, and became the main source of supply for Lincoln's drinking water. Equipment handled by the siding included two triple expansion steam engines, three Lancashire boilers, the pumps for the four boreholes, and materials for construction of the buildings. By 1920, the goods yard had acquired a cattle pen next to the two sidings on the north side, and a goods shed close to the Great North Road, but all traces of the temporary siding to Elkesley had been removed. Passenger services to the station, which had no nearby centre of population, ceased on 14 September 1931.

Just to the east of the passenger station was Morton Siding, which served a small brick works, and was operational by 1899. It consisted of a trailing siding with a headshunt to the south of the running lines. By 1920, a second siding had been installed, the clay pit was more extensive and was linked to the brick works by a short tramway, but the works was disused.

=== Retford bypass ===
In the early 1960s, the A1 road was diverted away from Retford, and a new overbridge was constructed to the west of the level crossing, as part of the Retford bypass, from late 1957, a dual-carriageway bridge was built by Robert McGregor & Sons. The £144,067 improvement was called Five Lane Ends to North of Checkerhouse. Previously there had been quarter mile queues on the north-south Blyth Road A614 at this unsuitably-placed level crossing.

The bridge spanned the two running tracks and the southern siding, with the signal box now located to the east of the road. The northern sidings were cut back, and the trailing connection to the eastbound track was removed. The level crossing continued to be used by local traffic for several years afterwards. The goods station closed in 1963, and most of the infrastructure was subsequently removed, although a loading gauge was still evident to the north of the tracks in 1992 and 2021, and the site of the level crossing gate is now occupied by the equipment room for a hot axle box detector.

=== Reopening ===
In 2019, when Bassetlaw District Council were preparing their local plan, they looked at potential sites for a garden village development. One of the two main contenders was at Morton, bordering the Worksop to Retford line and the site of the former Checker House station. The development would include some 4,000 new homes, 37 acres (15 ha) devoted to employment, and a new secondary school. One of the key requirements for such a site was sustainable transport, and their report therefore considered options for opening a new station at or close to the former Checker House station.

A separate technical appraisal was carried out, and identified possible ways to service a new station. Trains which operate over the line include an hourly service between Lincoln and Sheffield, and an hourly service between Sheffield and Gainsborough Central, which commenced in 2019. The Gainsborough trains could easily stop without significantly affecting the timetable, since they have a 22-minute scheduled layover at Gainsborough, which would be reduced to 16 minutes if three minutes are allowed for a stop in both directions. It might be more difficult for the Lincoln timetable to accommodate a stop, but the possibility of another new station at Waverley, proposed in Sheffield's City Rail Vision, might require a more thorough reworking of the timetable, which could then include a stop at Morton. A third option would be to extend the Robin Hood Line's service between Nottingham and Worksop onwards to Retford, but this was thought to be quite expensive, due to the requirement for an additional trainset to accommodate the timetable revision required.

The cost of providing a new station was estimated to be around £10 million, with predicted passenger revenues contributing between £105,000 and £450,000 per year. One operational benefit for Network Rail would be the potential for removal of the three level crossings between Worksop and Retford. These consist of a farmer's crossing at Morton Hill Farm, known as Howards No 1 crossing, near to Checker House station site, the crossing of the B6420 Mansfield Road at the eastern extremity of the development site, and the Old London Road crossing, just to the east of the Mansfield Road crossing. Network Rail are keen to remove level crossings to reduce the risk of collisions, and thus improve safety.

Preceding station	Disused railways	Following station
Worksop	Great Central Railway; Sheffield and Lincolnshire Junction Railway	Retford
