= Gainsborough railway station =

Gainsborough railway station may refer to the following stations in Gainsborough, Lincolnshire:

- Gainsborough Central railway station
- Gainsborough Lea Road railway station
