= Morton Garden Village railway station =

Proposed railway station in Nottinghamshire, England

Morton Garden Village

General information
- Location: Bassetlaw District, Nottinghamshire; England
- Line: Sheffield–Lincoln line
Location

Morton Garden Village railway station is a proposed railway station in Bassetlaw District, Nottinghamshire, England, near the A1 and A57 junction and the site of the former Checker House railway station.

The station would be on the Sheffield–Lincoln line, an existing line between Lincoln and Sheffield that now has hourly passenger train service.
