= Lincoln Corporation Waterworks =

Former water company in England

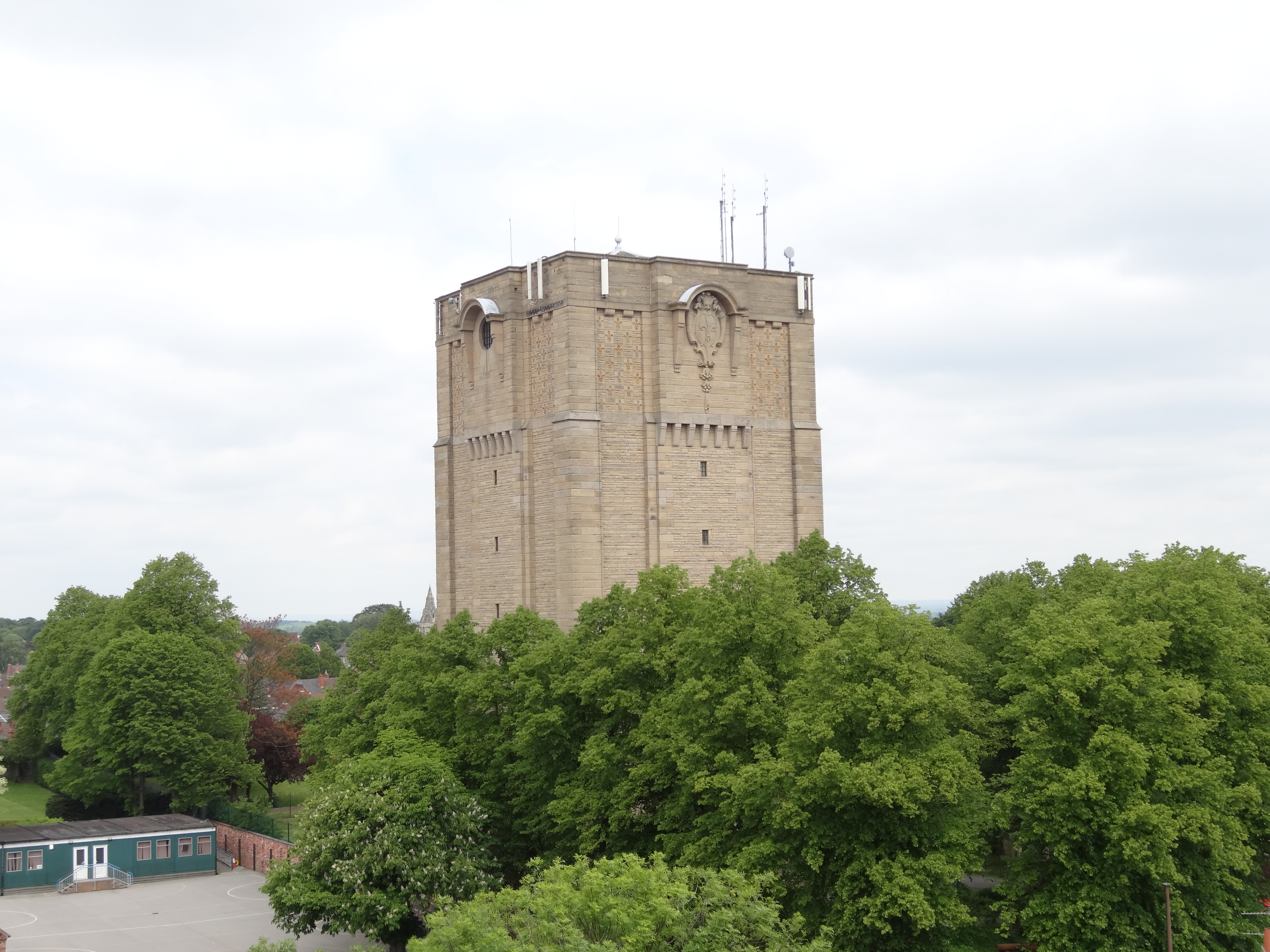
- Westgate water tower was completed in 1911 to store water from boreholes at Elkesley.
- Industry: Water and sewage
- Founded: 1871
- Fate: Taken over
- Successor: Anglian Water Authority
- Headquarters: Lincoln, England
- Key people: Thomas Hawksley

Lincoln Corporation Waterworks and its predecessors and successors have provided a public water supply and sewerage and sewage treatment services to the city of Lincoln, England. The Romans are known to have built a conduit from the Roaring Meg stream to a water tower in East Bight. Further development took place when the Lincoln Waterworks Act 1846 (9 & 10 Vict. c. cxi) was passed to establish the Lincoln Water Company, following a national outbreak of cholera in 1831–32.

The main source of supply was formed by impounding Prial Drain to form Hartsholme Lake. The water was filtered by sand filters at Boultham, and was pumped to a service reservoir at Westgate. Lincoln Corporation wanted to gain control of their water supply, and bought out the water company in 1871. The enabling act of Parliament, the Lincoln Waterworks Act 1871 (34 & 35 Vict. c. cxlix) also allowed them to construct a sewerage network, which fed a sewage farm at Canwick, but the Bracebridge area was not connected to the sewers, and waste water polluted local watercourses. There were sporadic outbreaks of typhoid and cholera, although the corporation argued that these might not be linked to a polluted water supply.

Two instances of typhoid were reported in November 1904, leading to a significant outbreak. By late April 1905, 131 individuals had succumbed to the disease, with an additional 1,045 affected. The waterworks became pioneers by introducing sodium hypochlorite to disinfect the water, a pioneering move in the country. In response, Neil McKechnie Barron assumed the role of corporation engineer, overseeing efforts that connected Bracebridge to sewers, enhanced water filtration, constructed the Westgate water tower, and initiated the quest for a new water source. Despite objections from Nottinghamshire about water leaving the county, new boreholes were drilled at Elkesley in the Nottinghamshire red sandstone beds. This project, which involved laying a pipeline from Elkesley to Lincoln, was completed by 4 October 1911, marked by a grand opening ceremony. Following the detection of E-coli bacteria in the water in 1932 and 1933, chlorination plants were integrated into the system. As the population increased, a fifth borehole was constructed at Elkesley and another was built at Newton on Trent.

Lincoln ceased to be responsible for its own water supply from 1961, when the waterworks became part of the Lincoln and District Water Board. The pipeline from Elkesley to Lincoln was duplicated, but after 62 years of trouble-free service, one of the two beam engines at Elkesley exploded in 1973, and both were replaced by electric pumps. At around the same time, the Anglian Water Authority, newly created under the terms of the Water Act 1973, became responsible for the regions water supply, sewerage and sewage treatment.

Following the passing of the Public Health Act 1848 (11 & 12 Vict. c. 63), there was a greater understanding of the need to deal with waste water. Lincoln was fortunate in that the engineer George Giles came to the city in 1847, working on the construction of the Great Northern Railway, and he had experience in sewerage systems. He produced a detailed report for the corporation, which included maps of the whole city, but there was significant opposition to any scheme to install underground drainage. In 1850 the principle of underground drainage was adopted, although Giles' report was not, but it took until 1881 until a scheme was fully implemented.

== History ==
Lincoln has been a centre of population since at least Roman times, when it was the site of the garrison of Lindum Colonial. Details of the water supply are a little sketchy, but it appears that they built a water tower or cistern in East Bight, close to the Newport Arch, which was connected to about 2,000 yards (1,800 m) of pipework, known as the "Conduit", at the far end of which was the Roaring Meg, a fast-flowing stream. The conduit was made of earthenware pipes, laid in a bed of cement. Archaeological excavation in the 1950s and 1970s led to speculation as to whether it ever functioned, because of the difference in levels between the stream and the water tower, but further investigation in 2007 as part of a housing development found clear signs that it was used for a considerable period.

In the 19th century, Lincoln saw a rapid rise in population as a result of industrialization, from 7,197 people in 1801 to 17,536 in 1851. Much of the population lived in unsanitary conditions. National outbreaks of cholera in 1831–32 and 1848–49 led to an act of Parliament, the Lincoln Waterworks Act 1846 (9 & 10 Vict. c. cxi), authorizing the creation of the Lincoln Water Company, with the engineer Thomas Hawksley responsible for the design. Under the act, the company was responsible for supplying the city of Lincoln and parts of Lindsey, Boultham, Bracebridge, Skellingthorpe and Kesteven, an area of 17.75 square miles (46.0 km^{2}). Charles Marshall became the company's manager and Henry Teague became the resident engineer.

An earth dam was built across the Skellingthorpe valley to the west of the city, to impound the waters of the Prial Drain. This became known as Hartsholme Lake and covered an area of 23 acres (9.3 ha), with a capacity of 40 million imperial gallons (180 Ml). An open channel, some 2.5 miles (4.0 km) long carried the water to Altham Terrace in Boultham, where the water was filtered by two sand filters. It was then pumped through a 9-inch (23 cm) cast iron pipe to an open service reservoir at Westgate, where a gas engine pumped water to the higher parts of the area of supply. The main pumping engine at Boultham was a 33 hp (25 kW) beam engine, bought second hand from a Cornish tin mine. It could deliver 110,000 imperial gallons (0.50 Ml) per day and the system was operational by 1849, when it was supplying water to 733 houses. Where there were courtyards and closes, a standpipe was installed, which allowed many households to access the water supply. The population continued to expand, and the pumping engine was replaced by a 40 hp (30 kW) engine. A pipeline also ran to the south, to feed a service reservoir on Bracebridge Heath.

=== Corporation ownership ===
As in many other towns and cities, Lincoln Corporation were keen to gain control of their own water supply, and the Lincoln Waterworks Act 1871 (34 & 35 Vict. c. cxlix) allowed them to take over the Lincoln Water Company. They paid £59-18-0 (£59.90) per share, and also paid off the debts which the company had, resulting in a final cost of £63,837. They employed J. H. Teague as their engineer, the son of Henry Teague who had served the water company for 25 years. The act also enabled the corporation to construct sewers, a waste disposal works, and a sewage works. A new service reservoir was built on Cross O'Cliff Hill, near to the psychiatric hospital. Bracebridge was by then a part of the city, and the water mains were extended in that area. At Boultham, water from ballast pits was used to supplement the supply from Hartsholme Lake, and a third filter was constructed. The option to take water from the River Witham was also included in the scheme, from an intake situated downstream of Bracebridge. By 1880, surface water and sewage from the city were conveyed to a works at Great Northern Terrace, and then to a sewage farm at Canwick, to the south-east of the city. However, the residents of Bracebridge were not connected to the sewerage network, and much of their waste was discharged into local watercourses. Despite receiving notices from the Medical Officer of Health in 1879, 1883 and 1885 calling attention to this situation, the corporation stated that the sporadic cases of cholera and typhoid were not necessarily linked to polluted water supplies.

By this time the population had increased to around 37,500, and an additional pump was installed at Boultham, capable of pumping 2 million imperial gallons (9.1 Ml) per day. More water was taken from the Witham, and in 1901, drilling started at Boultham, to see if water could be extracted from the red sandstone below the works. £24,000 was borrowed to fund the work, but progress was extremely slow. By 1901, the population had reached 50,000, and more filters were constructed at Boultham, to filter the increasing volume of water supplied. Two cases of typhoid were reported in November 1904, which had increased to 18 by early January 1905. The Medical Officer of Health declared it to be a serious outbreak, but the corporation refused to issue a public safety notice, for fear of a panic. Two weeks later, they issued notices to recommend boiling the water, but only to houses in the Sincil district. By 21 February, 61 people had died, and 732 people had contracted the disease. People abandoned using the public water supply, and returned to old wells and conduits, despite these having been declared unsafe. The numbers had increased to 113 dead and 1,006 with the disease by April, when the waterworks became the first in the country to add sodium hypochlorite to the water to disinfect it. The Great Northern Railway delivered tankers of clean water to the city throughout the epidemic, which began to wane by late April. A total of 131 people had died, and 1,045 had caught the infection by the time the crisis was over.

In the aftermath, intakes on the Pike Drain, Catchwater Drain and River Witham were shut off, and the corporation engineer resigned, to be replaced by Neil McKechnie Barron. He improved the filtering of the water at Boultham, and had a last attempt at extracting water from the borehole there. It was some 2,200 feet (670 m) deep and although it proved capable of supplying large volumes of water, it was salty and could not be used. Automatic monitoring of the filtration rate was introduced, and the works were extended to include an aeration tank and clear water reservoir. There was a drought in the summer of 1905, which restricted the amount of water available, so a new intake was opened on the River Witham, further upstream beyond Bracebridge, and Bracebridge was connected to the sewerage network, to prevent pollution of the watercourses.

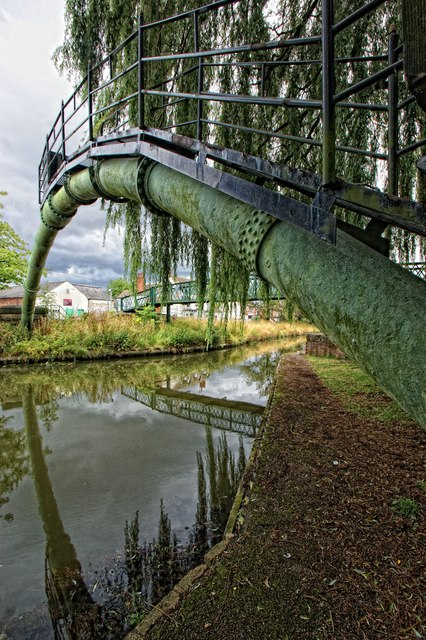
The main pipeline from Elkesley to Lincoln is self-supporting where it crosses the Foss Dyke Navigation at Saxilby.

Barron recommended that service reservoirs should be covered, rather than open, and that a water tower should be built to create adequate water pressure for the higher areas of the city. Together with two new rising mains, the project was costed at £50,000. An important advocate was Bishop E. King, who argued that Barron should be given more support for his scheme, and who calmed the people as well as representing them to the corporation. A sign of things to come was a grant for £50,000 to fund the construction of a water tower and covered reservoir in 1907.

=== Water from Nottinghamshire ===
The corporation wanted the tower to be of high quality, and asked architects to submit designs. Barron also submitted his own design, but the one chosen was by Reginald Blomfield. Westgate Water Tower consists of a circular brick tower, surrounded by a square structure constructed of Darley Dale gritstone, decorated with fleur-de-lys motifs to represent the patron saint of Lincoln, the Virgin Mary. The tank at the top holds 300,000 imperial gallons (1.4 Ml) of water, and its round design ensures there are no corners where water could stagnate. A replacement for the Cross O'Cliff Hill reservoir was constructed a little further to the south on Grantham Road, where the underlying rock was close to the surface. The new structure was circular, with a radius of 131.75 feet (40.16 m), with walls that were vertical on the outside, but sloping on the inside, with the width increasing from 3 feet (0.91 m) at the top to 9 feet (2.7 m) at the bottom. The walls were 22 feet (6.7 m) high, and the roof was supported by a number of columns. The pump house, which was designed by Barron in the Baroque Revival style, is located on the south-east edge of the tank and is now grade II listed. The reservoir had a capacity of 6 million imperial gallons (27 Ml), which would supply the city for about three days at the time it was constructed.

The final part of the scheme depended on finding a new source of pure water. Barron submitted 13 reports, each detailing one possible solution, which were whittled down to two, one at Dorrington, where water would be extracted from the Lincolnshire limestone, and the other at Elkesley, where it would come from the Nottinghamshire red sandstone or bunter. He favoured the latter, because the water would not have to be softened. The bunter occupied an area of some 200 square miles (520 km^{2}), with the water around 600 feet (180 m) deep, and only 30 feet (9.1 m) below the surface. The bill to authorise the work faced a difficult passage, with Nottinghamshire County Council objecting to water being transferred out of the county, but after legal battles in the courts, the House of Lords finally ruled in their favour. The Lincoln Corporation (Water, &c.) Act 1908' (8 Edw. 7. c. xxxiii) was obtained on 11 August 1908 but made the corporation responsible for water supply to a much larger area.

A ceremony to mark the start of the scheme was held on 24 October 1908, when 50 people travelled to Elkesley. Bishop E. King prayed for the success of the venture, the mayor, Councillor J. H. Mills used a silver spade to cut the first sod, and the party retired to the Hop Pole pub at Ollerton when torrential rain began to fall. The first borehole was cut to a depth of 570 feet (170 m), and when pumping tests proved successful, three further boreholes were cut. All had been finished by September 1909. Work on the pumps and buildings was then started. Delivery of materials for the project was aided by the construction of a 3-mile (4.8 km) siding from near Checker House railway station to the borehole site. This was used to deliver two triple expansion steam engines, three Lancashire boilers, the pumps for the four boreholes, and materials for construction of the buildings. Bower Brothers of West Bridgford were awarded the contract to lay 22 miles (35 km) of pipeline from Elkesley to Lincoln. The route followed the Great North Road, now the A1 road, southwards to Markham Moor, and then followed the A57 road to Lincoln. Most of it was made of cast iron pipes, 21 inches (53 cm) in diameter, but where the route crossed rivers or railways, lapped steel was used. A separate contract was awarded to Cleveland Bridge & Engineering Company for the section crossing the River Trent, where the steel pipe was carried on a bridge with six spans, next to the toll bridge at Dunham. They also built a crossing over the Foss Dyke at Saxilby, where the pipe is self-supporting, with an air release valve in the centre, and an access gantry to allow the valve to be serviced. A similar arrangement was used at Odder where the pipeline crosses the River Till, although the rise is much less, because navigable headroom is not required. Because the pipeline followed the contours of the countryside, air release valves were fitted at all the high points.

In Lincoln, many of the streets were dug up, to accommodate the laying of the trunk mains, which were between 18 and 21 inches (46 and 53 cm) in diameter, and the smaller distribution pipes, to connect the houses to the new system. On 4 October 1911, the work was complete, having cost £248,000. Clement Newsum, the mayor, formally turned the system on at a ceremony held in the Arboretum. A jet of water rose into the air, to a height of 70 feet (21 m), and the bells of Lincoln Cathedral were rung to mark the occasion.

=== Development ===
Barron had explained at the opening ceremony that the main covered reservoir at Bracebridge Heath was not yet finished, as the rest of the scheme had been built in less time than expected. The reservoir held 6 million imperial gallons (27 Ml), and the pumphouse, which included a small tank to increase the pressure to houses in Bracebridge Health, Waddington, Branston, and Canwick, was completed in 1912. Several villages which were located close to the main pipeline from Elkesley were connected to it, including Saxilby, Hardwick, Thorney, Newton and Burton. Westgate reservoir ceased to be used, and part of it became Wickham Gardens swimming baths, with the rest becoming a park. The borehole at Boultham and the filters were retained, to supply another swimming bath, while Hartsholme reservoir was also disconnected from the system.

At first, the Elkesley boreholes supplied around 1.2 million imperial gallons (5.5 Ml) per day, but this had risen to 1.7 million imperial gallons (7.7 Ml) by 1919. In 1932, traces of the E-Coli bacteria were detected in the water. After the reservoir had been drained and cleaned, it was refilled and a chlorination plant added. The bacteria were again detected in 1933, and it was thought that the source was sewage from farms near the Elkesley boreholes draining into a test borehole which had been used to look for coal deposits and had not been properly sealed afterwards. On the recommendation of the Medical Office of Health, a second chlorination plant was installed at Elkesley, so that water could be disinfected prior to entering the pipeline. Demand continued to increase, and by 1935 the boreholes were supplying just under 2 million imperial gallons (9.1 Ml) to a population of 69,458 in Lincolnshire, and a further 58,400 imperial gallons (0.265 Ml) to 2,763 people in Nottinghamshire.

During the Second World War, Lincoln supplied water to the Gainsborough Rural District Council area and became an emergency water supply centre. The old works at Boultham was upgraded, so that it could treat 1.25 million imperial gallons (5.7 Ml) of water per day from the River Witham, which was pumped into the supply. Water was supplied in bulk to eight Royal Air Force bases in the locality, and intermittently to six others. A fifth borehole was drilled at Elkesley in 1943, with the water extracted by an electric pump capable of supplying 0.5 million imperial gallons (2.3 Ml) per day. As the Corporation Waterworks reached its centenary in June 1946, its area of supply had increased from 17.78 square miles (46.0 km^{2}) to 222 square miles (570 km^{2}), and the population had increased from 17,500 to 83,000. New sources of water were required, and a borehole at Newton on Trent found abundant water in the Bunter sandstone 1,250 feet (380 m) below the surface. Other sources were found in the local limestone aquifer but had the disadvantage that the water was harder.

=== New administration ===
Immediately after the Second World War, there were over 1,000 separate undertakings supplying fresh water in England and Wales, and over 1,400 dealing with sewerage and sewage treatment. The Water Act 1945 sought to being the process of rationalising an activity where there was little co-ordination between neighbouring undertakings, by consolidating local authority undertakings. The aim was that they would benefit from economies of scale, and to provide funding for water supply in rural areas. Donald Whiteley, who had been Lincoln's engineer throughout the war, was promoted to water engineer for the East of England and looked at how rationalisation might work over a wide area. As a result, Lincoln Corporation Waterworks ceased to be responsible for Lincoln's water from 1 April 1961, when under the Lincoln and District Water Board Order 1961 (SI 1961/441) the role was taken over by the Lincoln and District Water Board. It merged with four other rural district water departments, covering Gainsborough, North Kesteven, Retford and Welton.

A new requirement in the 1960s was the provision of treated water to three power stations to be built within the District Water Board area, generating a total of 5 gigawatts. A new water source was constructed at Grove in Nottinghamshire, with any surplus water feeding into the Lincoln city system. The pipeline between Elkesley and the Trent was duplicated, and a further two boreholes were drilled at Elkesley. An electric booster station named after Donald Whiteley pumped the water from them, and a new section of pipe meant that the electric system could be run independently to the steam-powered system. The pipeline from the Trent to Lincoln was then duplicated, following a new route along Doddington Road to reach Bracebridge Heath reservoir. The circular tank there was supplemented by two square tanks, increasing the storage capacity from 6 million imperial gallons (27 Ml) to 16 million imperial gallons (73 Ml).

Elkesley pumping station had originally housed two triple-expansion steam engines, named Janetta and Livens. They had worked for 62 years without trouble, but on 17 October 1973, Janetta exploded, shooting a large part of a piston through the roof. Significant damage was caused to the boiler, the control system and the building, so that Livens could not be used either. Lincoln had to rely on the electric pumping station, the spare capacity of the Grove boreholes, and the borehole at Newton. It was decided that Janetta was beyond repair, and as Livens was of the same age, there was a risk that it too might fail. Electric pumps were fitted at the bottom of the boreholes, and a temporary system of diesel and electric booster pumps was installed, which remained in use for six years. Meanwhile, the Water Act 1973 had created a new administrative structure for the water industry, and on 1 April 1974 the Lincoln and District Water Board became part of the Anglian Water Authority, one of ten regional authorities responsible for water supply, sewerage and sewage treatment in England and Wales.

The removal of the two steam engines presented a problem, as there was no obvious way to do so without demolishing the listed building in which they resided. It took almost five years to get permission to pull down the building. The engines were given to a museum trust, in the hope that one would be re-erected, but they were both scrapped subsequently. Once authorisation had been obtained, a ceremony was held, at which the mayor used the silver spade which had been first used in 1908, and construction of the all-electric station began. It could pump 4 million imperial gallons (18 Ml) per day and was named McBarron, after Neil McKechnie Barron.

=== Sewerage ===
The 1830s and 1840s were a time of considerable political upheaval in Britain. The Reform Act 1832 had begun the process of giving votes to at least part of the population. This was followed by the Municipal Corporations Act 1835, which replaced self-perpetuating corporations in towns and cities with democratically elected councils. In 1838 there had been a serious outbreak of typhus, and the reformer Edwin Chadwick had spent three years compiling his report on The Sanitary Conditions of the Labouring Classes in Britain in 1842, which had caught the public imagination, and became an unexpected best-seller for Her Majesty's Stationery Office. This led to the setting up of the Health of Towns Commission, while Chadwick campaigned vigorously for a system where every house would have a constant water supply and adequate sewerage, since the introduction of water closets only made matters worse if they led to cesspools overflowing, rather than the waste being carried away to be treated elsewhere.

Lord Morpeth had introduced a bill to Parliament in 1847, which would have required all town councils and town commissioners to ensure that every house had a water supply, and that issues of drainage, sewerage and street paving were addressed. There was opposition to the proposals, and by the time it became the Public Health Act 1848 (11 & 12 Vict. c. 63), many of its key proposals had been diluted. Nevertheless, it created a General Board of Health, and the powers required to implement water and sewerage schemes could be obtained by a town requesting that an inspector from the board carried out a survey, rather than requiring a local act of Parliament, which was a much more costly exercise. The process was still not straightforward, as there were disagreements between men such as Chadwick who advocated glazed pipes for the sewers, and engineers such as Hawksley who advocated brick-built sewers, and there was no real agreement on what to do with the sewage once the pipework had been installed. Water supply produced a product which could be sold to households, and so private enterprise could finance many of the initial schemes, but sewerage did not produce anything that had a similar saleable value. Local authorities therefore had to fund the works themselves, and rates were generally not sufficient to fund such capital work.

Lincoln was fortunate in that the Great Northern Railway loop line was being built from Peterborough to Gainsborough, via Boston and Lincoln, and this brought the engineer George Giles to the city in 1847. Giles had previously been involved in railway construction in Hamburg, and when much of the city had been destroyed by fire in 1842, had blown up houses to prevent the fire spreading further, after which he had managed the construction of a sewerage and water supply system for the city as it was rebuilt. Lincoln had not asked the Board of Health to carry out an inspection, but they had set up a sanitary committee, which became responsible for implementing the provisions of the Public Health Act 1848 and knowing of Giles' experience in the field of sanitation, asked him to produce a report. He began his research in December 1848 and presented the report to the sanitary committee in September 1849.

=== Giles's report ===
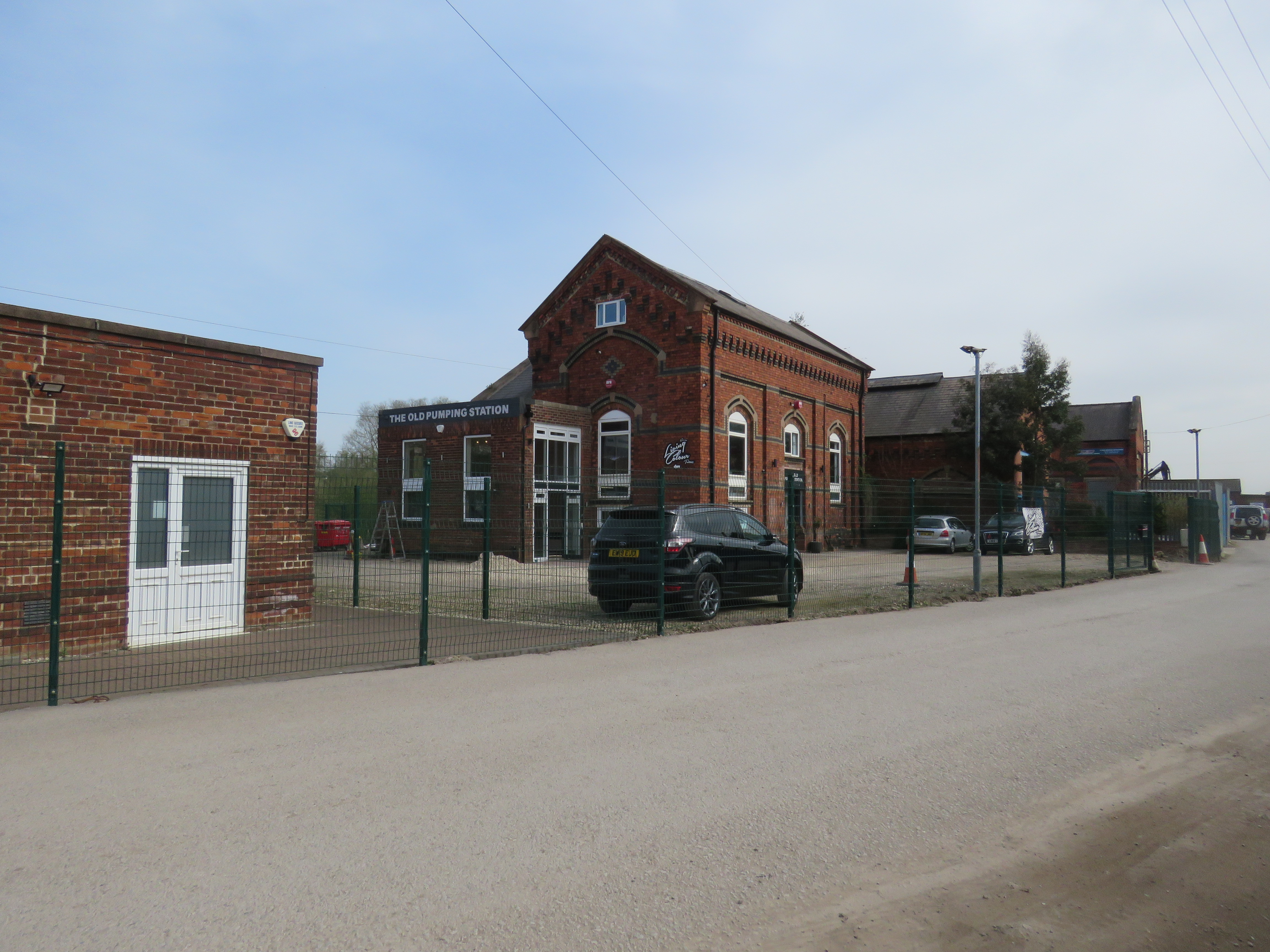
The sewage pumping station beside the Sincil Dyke pumped sewage to Canwick sewage farm when the scheme opened in 1881.

In his report, Giles considered the geography and geology of Lincoln, followed by a description of surface drainage channels. He then considered house drainage, where most wastewater including scullery waste was simply discharged into open channels in the streets. Privies and water closets discharged into cesspools, but some discharged into covered drains, which then discharged into the street channels. There were particular problems with cesspools overflowing, either into the streets or into houses, and a large number of piggeries which also contributed to the general filth. The conditions on each street were listed, and a common issue was that cesspools were often at a higher level than the houses, creating damp conditions and noxious air. On West Gate, cesspools were close to the houses, and two piggeries, a manure heap and a cow house discharged into the cellar of a house. A final problem was the practice of burying people within the city, close to houses. Giles produced a large plan of the city, and identified 21 burial grounds, but suspected that there were more.

Giles then mapped out a way forwards, much of which was detailed in plans and lithographs, rather than in text. He considered that the surface drainage could remain as it was and was therefore outside the scope of his remit. For house drainage, he proposed an arterial system, which would enable all sewage to reach a single discharge point. The layout of the sewers was shown on two plans, one drawn at 40 inches to the mile (1:1584), and one at 20 inches (1:3164). Provision for keeping the sewers clear was made by including flushing heads at strategic points, which would be connected to the supply provided by Lincoln Water Company. His plans showed six sizes of sewers, three constructed of bricks, and three using glazed pipes. One problem at the time was what to do with the sewage when it reached its destination. Chadwick had thought that it could be used as manure on the land, but after much consideration, Giles elected for chemical precipitation. The solid material could then be used as fertiliser, but it was nowhere near as effective as guano, which was readily available on the market. Finally, Giles estimated that 88,590 feet of sewers, or 16.8 miles (27.0 km) would be required and could be installed at a cost of £29,388. The sewers would drain to a location near Stamp End Lock, and the price included £1,900 for an engine house, steam engine and pumps, as not all of the sewage could reach that point by gravity.

In October 1849, the sanitary committee met to consider Giles' report. Of his plan of the city, a newspaper report stated:

The plan, a work of art, elicited the admiration of all present; every building is set out, and the height, above the Stamp End datum line, given for every locality.

It is difficult to know whether the committee were over-awed by the technical aspects of the report, but the discussion centred on whether there was a profit to be made from the manufacture of manure at the end of the process. The works would be entirely controlled by the corporation, which would allow them, under the terms of the Public Health Act 1848, to borrow the capital cost and repay it over 30 years. In view of the increased rates that would be needed to repay the loan, the committee decided that public consultation was necessary before proceeding, and resolved to print 500 copies of the report, to be sold at one shilling each, so that the public would be better informed. The committee recommended to the council that it should adopt the scheme, but the full council only decided to hold a public meeting, scheduled for 24 January 1850.

=== Implementation ===
Adoption of Giles' report was proposed at the meeting, but there were others who opposed it, on the grounds that the expense was unnecessary, and claiming that the poor health of the poor was due to their lifestyle. The meeting ended in uproar when it was suggested that some of the commons could be sold and used as building land to fund the scheme. A second meeting was held on 10 May, at which the subject was debated more reasonably, but there was significant opposition, with claims that open sewers were better, and that the sewerage schemes in Hull and Gainsborough had caused outbreaks of cholera. Significantly, Councillor Edward Willson argued against the scheme, and questioned what would happen to the sewage when it reached Stamp End. A final meeting on 27 May was described as rough by The Chronicle, with the speeches "fit only for brothels and the lowest pot houses", but somehow, despite general uproar, and Bellatti the printer of the reports needing a police escort to leave the meeting, the principle of underground drainage was adopted, although Giles' scheme was not.

The Public Health Act 1848 was repealed and replaced by the Local Government Act 1858. It was permissive, rather than mandatory, and while discussion about it was taking place, adoption was thwarted by Charles Ward, who presented a petition containing 2,550 signatures opposing such action. A joint sewer was constructed from the County Hospital and the psychiatric hospital in 1860, which discharged into Brayfood Pool. There was further debate in 1864, and the mayor, Alderman Harvey, offered a prize to whoever wrote the best essay on underground drainage in Lincoln, which was won by a land agent called David Middleton. The mayor published the essay, together with an account of his visit to a sewage farm in Croydon. Following this, he led a party of council members on a fact-finding mission, which visited Croydon and another facility in Worthing.

The council finally adopted the Local Government Act 1858 in 1866, despite further public opposition, and the council became a local board of health. This led to the abolition of the lighting and paving commission, and although the council appointed three consultants, progress was slow, although a number of new covered drains had been constructed by this time. Things got really bad in 1870, when Joseph Shuttleworth had to close his factory because the workers could no longer abide the stench of the river. A government inspector visited the city soon afterwards, but his report was less than impartial, which stirred up those who were against sanitary reform. However, in 1876, the Local Government Board took legal action against the corporation, and a contract to construct underground sewerage was awarded in September 1876. The contractor became bankrupt, but the scheme was eventually completed in 1881. The sewers drained to a sewage pumping station on the south side of the Sincil Dyke, where some filters were constructed, and the sewage was pumped to a sewage farm, which was part of Canwick Manor Farm, by Washingborough Road.

== Bibliography ==
- Binnie, G M (1981). Early Victorian Water Engineers. Thomas Telford. ISBN 978-0-7277-0128-2.
- George, Beryl (2011). "Lincoln, Sewerage and Government Inspectors" (PDF). SLHA Journal : Lincolnshire History and Archaeology. Archived (PDF) from the original on 6 April 2022.
- Lewis, Caroline (12 April 2007). "Archaeologists Find Evidence Romans Used Lincoln Aqueduct". Culture 24. Archived from the original on 11 September 2018.
- Mills, Dennis R (2015). Effluence and Influence – Public Health, Sewers and Politics in Lincoln, 1848–50. Society for Lincolnshire History and Archaeology. ISBN 978-0-903582-53-7.
- Norton, Emily (23 August 2015). "Lincoln's hidden gems". The Lincolnite. Archived from the original on 4 December 2020.
- Ofwat (2006). "The Development of the Water Industry in England and Wales" (PDF). OFWAT. Archived from the original (PDF) on 4 June 2015.
- Pacey, Trevor E (2011). To fetch a pail of water (2nd ed.). Tucann Books. ISBN 978-1-907516-15-3.
- Whitelam, Paul (3 October 2018). "Typhoid killed 131 people in Lincoln". Lincolnshire Live. Archived from the original on 13 April 2021.
