= Sturton railway station =

Former English railway station

Sturton
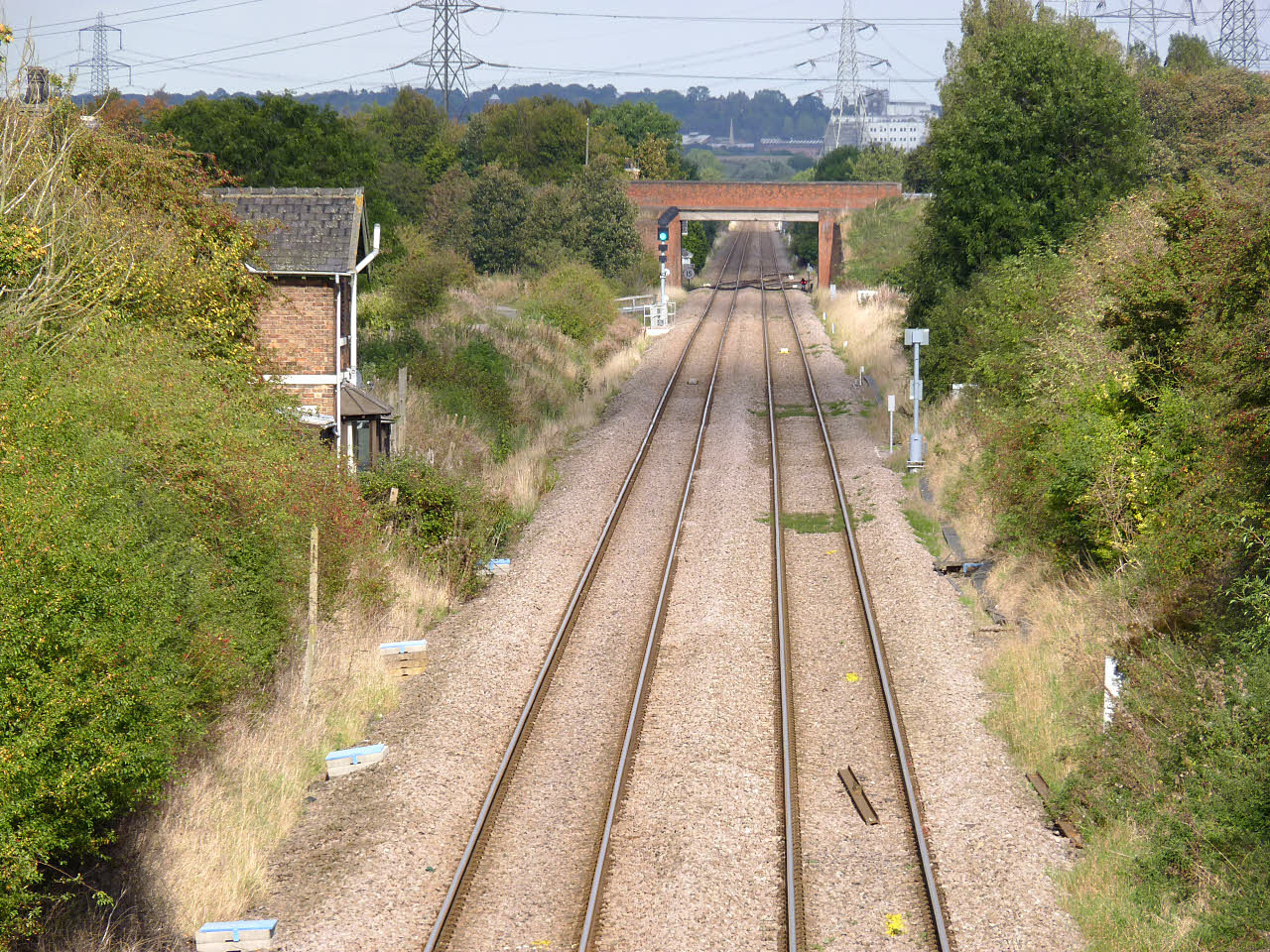

General information
- Location: Sturton le Steeple, Nottinghamshire; England
- Coordinates: 53.3543°N 0.8276°W
- Grid reference: SK781848
- Platforms: 2

Other information
- Status: Disused

History
- Original company: Manchester, Sheffield and Lincolnshire Railway
- Pre-grouping: Great Central Railway
- Post-grouping: London and North Eastern Railway

Key dates
- 17 July 1849: Station opened
- 2 February 1959: Station closed
Location

Sturton railway station was an intermediate stop on the eastern main line of the Great Central Railway, opened in 1849. Besides the village of Sturton le Steeple in Nottinghamshire, England, it also served the villages of North Wheatley and South Wheatley, both also being in Nottinghamshire. It closed in 1959.

== History ==
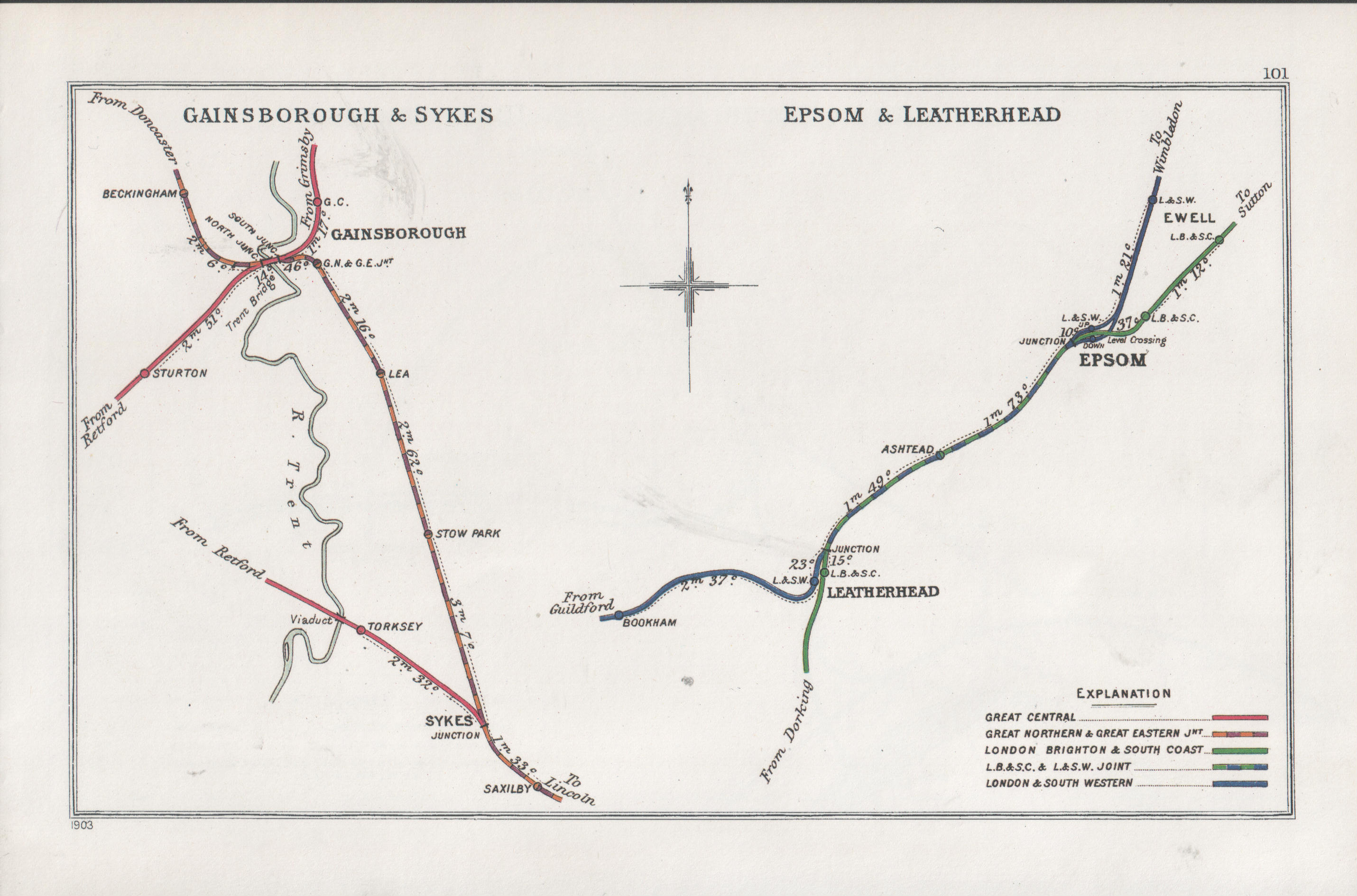
A 1903 Railway Clearing House Junction Diagram showing (left) railways in the vicinity of Sturton (centre left)

The Manchester, Sheffield and Lincolnshire Railway (MS&LR) was formed on 1 January 1847 by the amalgamation of several railway companies, one of which was the Sheffield and Lincolnshire Junction Railway (S&LJR). This had been incorporated on 3 August 1846 for a line linking Sheffield (on the Sheffield, Ashton-under-Lyne and Manchester Railway) with Gainsborough (on the Great Grimsby and Sheffield Junction Railway).

The main line of the MS&LR between Manchester and Grimsby was opened in stages. The final section – that of the erstwhile S&LJR between Woodhouse Junction and Gainsborough – was opened by the MS&LR on 17 July 1849, and included five intermediate stations, one of which was Sturton, just over 70 1/2 miles (113.5 km) from Manchester.

In 1897, the MS&LR was renamed the Great Central Railway (GCR). In 1904 Sturton station had facilities for handling passengers, parcels, goods and livestock (including horses and prize cattle). The GCR amalgamated with other railways on 1 January 1923 to create the London and North Eastern Railway.

Sturton station closed to passengers on 2 February 1959.

Preceding station	Historical railways	Following station
Retford; Line and station open	Great Central Railway; Sheffield and Lincolnshire Junction Railway	Gainsborough Central; Line and station open
