= Sheffield–Lincoln line =

Railway line in England

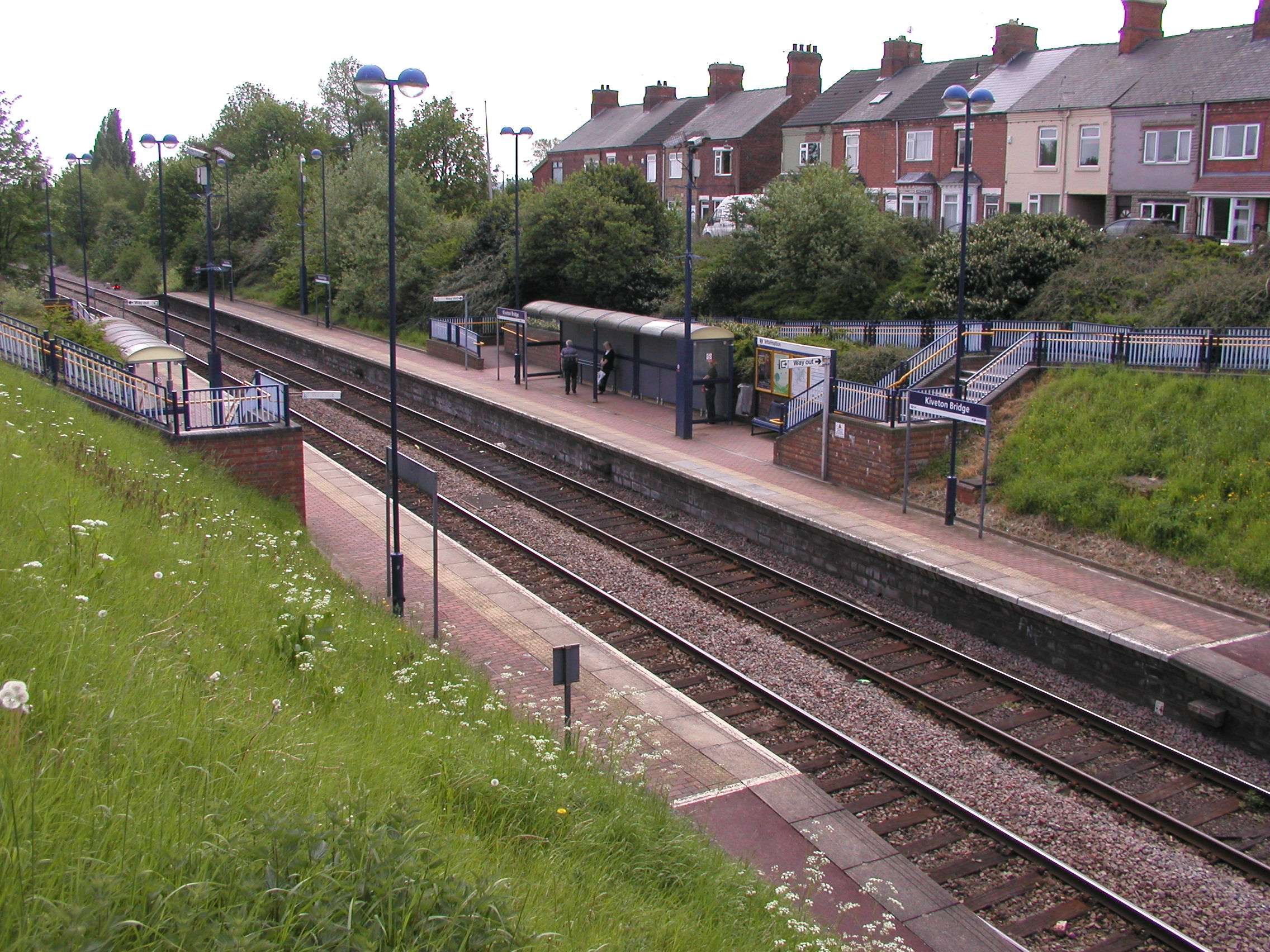
- Kiveton Bridge station

Overview
- Status: Operational
- Owner: Network Rail
- Locale: East Midlands; Yorkshire and the Humber
- Termini: Sheffield; Lincoln (main line), Cleethorpes (Brigg Branch)
- Stations: 11 (main Line), 20 (Brigg branch)

Service
- Type: Heavy rail
- System: National Rail
- Operator(s): Northern; East Midlands Railway
- Rolling stock: Class 170 "Turbostar"; Class 158 "Express Sprinter"; Class 195 "Civity"; Class 150 "Sprinter"

Technical
- Track length: 48 miles (77 km) (main line); 72 miles (116 km) (Brigg branch)
- Num of tracks: Two (One on sections on Brigg branch)
- Track gauge: 1,435 mm (4 ft 8 1/2 in) standard gauge
- Electrification: No
- Operating speed: 60 miles per hour (97 km/h) (Max.)
Route map
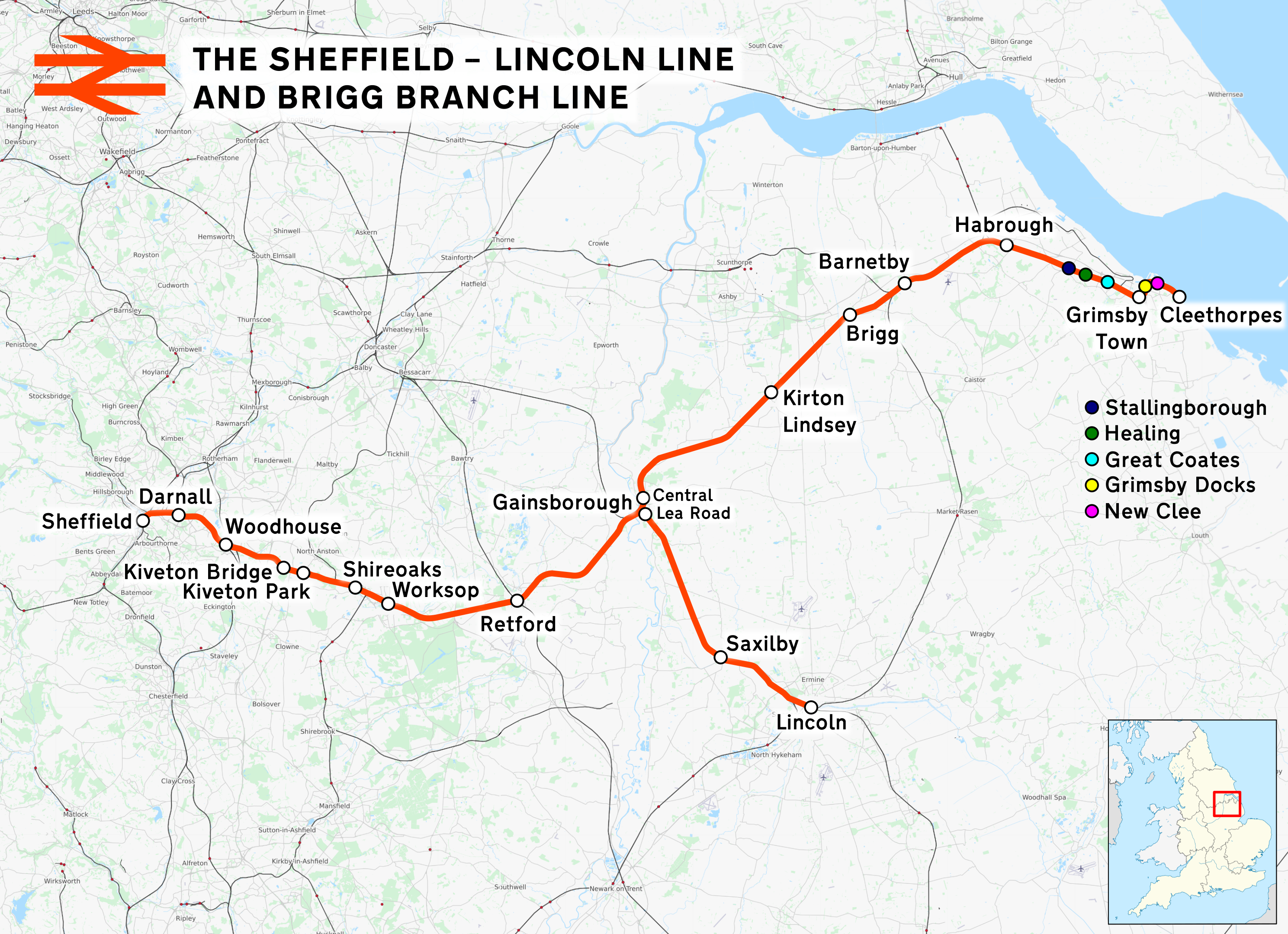
(Click to expand)

The Sheffield–Lincoln line is a railway line in England. It runs from Sheffield to Lincoln via Worksop, Retford and Gainsborough Lea Road. The route comprises the main line of the former Manchester, Sheffield and Lincolnshire Railway (MS&LR), to Gainsborough Trent Junction, where it then follows the former Great Northern and Great Eastern Joint Railway (GNGEJR) to Lincoln Central. The former MS&LR main line continues from Trent Junction to Wrawby Junction, Barnetby, much of it now single line, where it then runs to Cleethorpes. In 2023, the Department for Transport announced that a new station will be opened on the line. Waverley station will be located between Darnall and Woodhouse.

== History ==
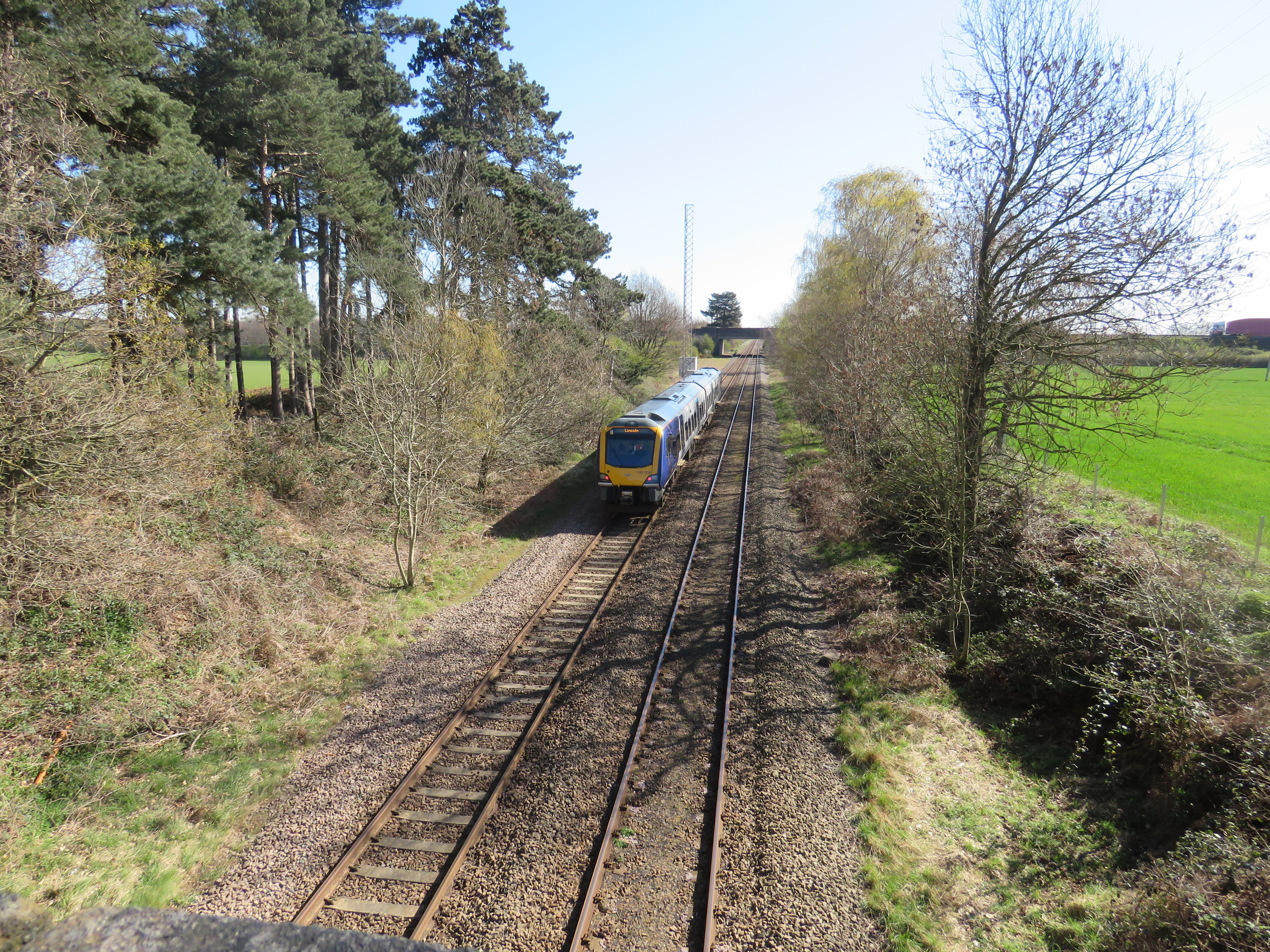
Checker House A1 bridge, built in 1959, seen in April 2021

In the 1950s the line crossed the A1 single-carriageway, at a level crossing, known as Checker House. As part of the Retford bypass, from late 1957, a dual-carriageway bridge was built by Robert McGregor & Sons. The £144,067 improvement was called Five Lane Ends to North of Checkerhouse, the former Checker House railway station.

Previously there were quarter mile queues on the A1 at this level crossing.

== Routes ==
=== Current services ===
The line comprises two passenger routes: the main line route from Sheffield to Lincoln and a branch line route running from Sheffield to Cleethorpes, using the Brigg branch line from Gainsborough Trent Junction. North of Gainsborough Central the Brigg branch line primarily carries freight trains to/from the Port of Immingham.

==== Main line route ====
The route largely follows the former MS&LR main line, until Trent Junction, Gainsborough where it goes on to follow the former GNGEJR line to Lincoln.

- Sheffield
- Darnall
- Woodhouse
- Kiveton Bridge
- Kiveton Park
- Shireoaks
- Worksop
  - connections with Robin Hood Line
- Retford
  - connections with ECML services at Retford
    - Joined by Doncaster-Lincoln Line at West Trent Junction.
    - Diverges from the former MSLR main line and joins the former GMGEJR line, now the main route line at East Trent Junction.
- Gainsborough Lea Road
  - connections with Doncaster–Lincoln line
- Saxilby
- Lincoln Central

An hourly service provided by Northern runs along this route. Additional services provided by East Midlands Railway serve the section between Lincoln and Gainsborough Lea Road en route to Doncaster.

==== Brigg branch line route ====
This route follows the former MS&LR main line to Cleethorpes.

- Sheffield
- Darnall
- Woodhouse
- Kiveton Bridge
- Kiveton Park
- Shireoaks
- Worksop
  - connections with Worksop–Nottingham line
- Retford
  - connections with ECML services at Retford
    - Continues on the former MS&LR main line, now Brigg Branch Line, from East Trent Junction.
- Gainsborough Central
- Kirton Lindsey
- Brigg
  - Joins the South Humberside Main Line (from Hatfield and Stainforth) and Grimsby–Lincoln–Newark line (from Market Rasen)
- Barnetby
  - connections with South TransPennine route and Nottingham–Grimsby line
    - Joined by the Barton line (from Barton-on-Humber)
- Habrough
  - connections with Barton on Humber–Cleethorpes line
- Grimsby Town
- Cleethorpes

On weekdays, a single daily service Sheffield and Gainsborough Central is provided by Northern. This was introduced in the May 2023 timetable change and is the first regular weekday service to run on the Brigg branch since 1993. Passenger services along the entire route only ran on Saturdays previously, when Northern operated three services each way between Sheffield and Cleethorpes. At Barnetby, the route is joined by the South Humberside Main Line and the section between there and Cleethorpes is also served by hourly trains from Liverpool Lime Street, operated by TransPennine Express.

The Brigg Branch line is single track from Barnetby to Brigg, and Kirton Tunnel to Thonock (North of Gainsborough Central) with a passing loop at Northorpe. Other sections are double track.

=== Former routes ===
==== Clarborough Junction-Sykes Junction branch ====
Clarborough Junction is about 3.75 miles (6.04 km) east of Retford. This Sheffield and Lincolnshire Junction Railway branch had originally been proposed in 1844. It opened on 7 August 1850

The line diverged from the MS&LR main line at Clarborough junction ran through Leverton, Cottam and Torksey to Sykes Junction (located about 1.3 miles (2.1 km) northwest of Saxilby). Services from Sheffield via the branch line to Lincoln, then continuing to Grimsby and Cleethorpes via Market Rasen, used to operate along the line. Opening of the line was delayed for four months by controversy over the safety of Torksey Viaduct. It is now a Grade II listed structure, though the line closed to passengers on 2 November 1959.

In 1967 the line was reopened from Clarborough Junction to Cottam to serve Cottam power stations and solely used for freight traffic. On reopening, Clarborough Junction signalbox was closed and control passed to Thrumpton, and the two level crossings were converted to automatic half barriers. The Thrumpton box was rebuilt in 2014.

With the closure of Cottam power station in 2019, the line became disused. The final train was "The Cottam Farewell" railtour, which travelled over the line on 28 September 2019. In 2020, the line was still classed as "live" and mandatory inspections and patrols were still taking place on foot.

== Accidents and incidents ==
- On 9 December 1983, a freight train collided at low speed with the side of a local passenger train at Wrawby Junction. The first carriage of the passenger train was derailed and turned over onto its side, and one passenger was killed instantly.
- On 28 February 2007, an EWS freight train derailed at a set of points between Lincoln Central train station and Lincoln High Street level crossing. There were no injuries.
- On 27 April 2012, a Northern Rail passenger train running the Lincoln-Adwick route derailed as it was leaving Clarborough Tunnel on the Retford side. This was due to a landslip onto the line. The driver and a passenger were taken to hospital with minor injuries.
- 4 December 2012, a Northern Rail Passenger train running a Scunthorpe-Lincoln route, struck and fatally injured a worker on the tracks near Saxilby.
- On 30 June 2015, a DB Schenker freight train was derailed near the site of Langworth station, on the Lincoln-Grimsby line.

== Types of train ==
The line is operated by Northern Trains, which mainly utilises Class 195 sets (though Class 150 DMUs can also appear). From Gainsborough Trent Junction (where the line from Doncaster joins) eastwards to Lincoln, Class 158 and Class 170 units operated by East Midlands Railway share the route beyond West Trent Junction with trains to/from Doncaster.

Most freight traffic using the line will leave this line and join the Doncaster to Lincoln line at West Trent Junction. With the closure of both West Burton Power Station and Cottam Power Station freight traffic west of West Trent Junction has ceased, aside from occasional freight diversions through the night.

== Retford dive-under ==
The Sheffield and Lincolnshire Junction Railway (S&LJR) (later Great Central Railway (GCR), now the Sheffield–Lincoln line) was the first railway in Retford, arriving on 6 July 1849. This was then joined by the Great Northern Railway (GNR) line from Doncaster, arriving on 4 September 1849 with the GNR crossing the S&LJR at a flat crossing. This flat crossing caused congestion as trains could not run on both lines at the same time; this was to become a bigger problem when the West Burton and Cottam power stations were built, as they would require 5 million imperial tons (approx. 5 million tonnes) of coal a year, to be sourced from the National Coal Board's coalfields in the East Midlands and North East. The flat crossing also placed a speed restriction on express trains using the GNR line.

In order to alleviate these problems a dive-under was constructed, by which the GCR passed under a new bridge which the GNR passed over. Construction started in 1963 and was completed in 1965. During construction, trains continued to use the flat crossing. Upon completion of the dive-under the flat crossing was finally removed on 13 June 1965, allowing through trains on the GNR to run at normal operating speeds, and allowing trains to run on both lines simultaneously. The approach slopes into the dive-under's 2,160 feet (660 m) long channel have a gradient of 1 in 100 on the east and 1 in 133 on the west side.
