= Retford railway station =

Railway station in Nottinghamshire, England

Retford
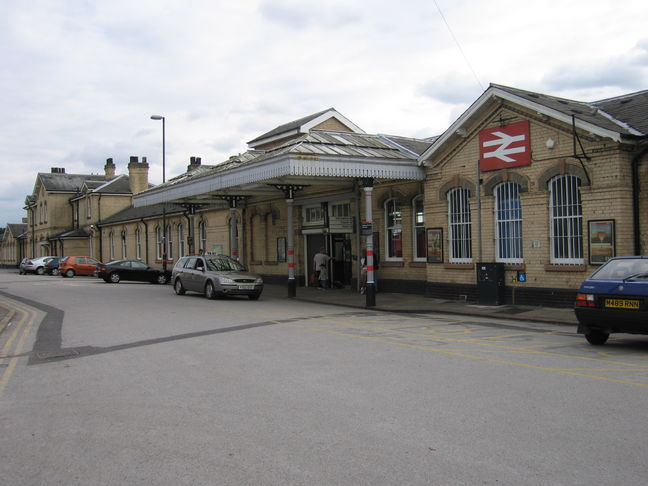
- The station in 2005

General information
- Location: Retford, Bassetlaw District, England
- Coordinates: 53.315°N 0.948°W
- Grid reference: SK701803
- Owner: Network Rail
- Manager: London North Eastern Railway
- Platforms: 4
- Tracks: 6

Other information
- Station code: RET
- Classification: DfT category C2

History
- Opened: 1849

Passengers
- 2020/21: ▼0.116 million
- Interchange: ▼19,682
- 2021/22: ▲0.456 million
- Interchange: ▲64,331
- 2022/23: ▲0.520 million
- Interchange: ▲66,127
- 2023/24: ▲0.546 million
- Interchange: ▲82,623
- 2024/25: ▲0.603 million
- Interchange: ▲0.105 million
Location
Notes
- Passenger statistics from the Office of Rail and Road

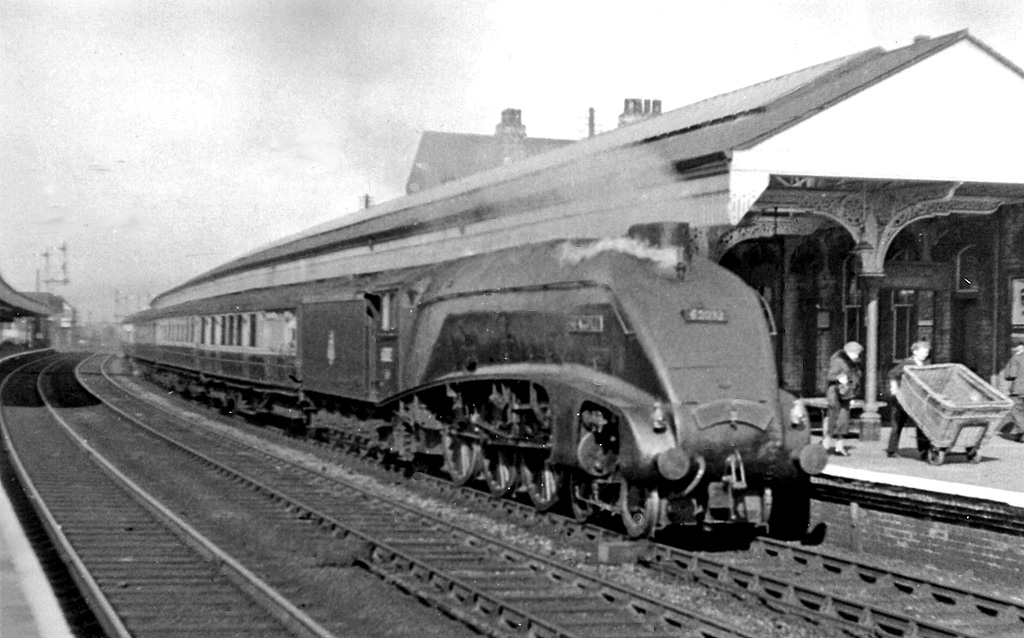
LNER Class A4 4902 Seagull pulling the Up Leeds express in 1954

Retford railway station is a stop on the East Coast Main Line, serving the town Retford, in Nottinghamshire, England. It lies 138 miles 49 chains (223.1 km) down the line from London King's Cross, and is situated between Newark Northgate and Doncaster on the main line. It has four platforms: two of which serve the main line (1 & 2); and the other two (3 & 4), located at a lower level and at right angles to the first pair, serve the Sheffield to Lincoln Line.

== History ==
Retford station was Grade II listed by Historic England in July 2020. The current buildings date from 1891-2: the reason for listing was given as "the very rare survival of the original finishes in the dining room and refreshment room" which are said to be ornate and featuring "fine craftsmanship"; the "remarkably long and well-balanced composition in the Italianate style" of the station buildings and the "impressive" canopy over the platform; and the well-preserved platform, which together make it "one of the most intact medium-sized GNR stations".

The Retford Times (1913) presented a memoir of William Briggs (b 1839), who recalled the arrival of the first locomotive: "The speculation and guesses as to what a steam train would be like, when it began to be talked about, was general. The first locomotive came on a heavy lorry. It arrived on a Saturday and, going down Dixon's Bridge, the weight sunk the wheels on one side to the axle, and it had to remain till Monday. On Sunday hundreds visited the spot." He also recalled a train going to Cleethorpes from Manchester and Sheffield which had 64 carriages, all full, and many of them open to the weather.

The Retford Times also published the memories of Frank George (b 1879), who worked at the WH Smith & Sons station bookstall. He recalled: "...the Duke and Duchess of Portland, Duke and Duchess of Newcastle, Earl and Countess Manvers, Earl and Countess of Yarborough, the Earl and Countess of Galway, the Foljambes, Laycocks, Denisons, Huntsmans etc" all used the station. The Duchess of Newcastle was said to change at Retford accompanied by her Russian Borzoi hounds. "If any special guests were staying at Welbeck Abbey, a magnificent equipage would bring them to Retford station, cockaded footmen and coachmen and occasionally postillion riders, a wonderful experience for any lad."

=== Historic station buildings ===
==== S&LJR line and Thrumpton station ====
The first railway into Retford was the Sheffield and Lincolnshire Junction Railway, which opened on 16 July 1849 on the line between Sheffield (Bridgehouses) and Gainsborough. The station for this line was at Thrumpton, part of which survives and is called The Old Station House.

==== The Great Northern Railway ====
The Great Northern Railway line from Doncaster arrived on 4 September 1849 crossing the S&LJR on the level. It used the Thrumpton station until its own station was completed on land to the east of Ordsall Lane (now called West Carr Road) in 1852. Several new streets were built at this time to link the station to the existing town, including Queen Street, Victoria Road, Station Road and Albert Road. On 1 July 1859, the S&LJR (now the Manchester, Sheffield & Lincolnshire Railway) began using the GNR station via a short connecting curve and closed its original station.

=== Layout ===
==== Original ====
Prior to the remodelling of the station, the S&LJR and GNR lines crossed at a flat crossing, with a curve connecting the northern and eastern tracks. This allowed trains on the Sheffield-Gainsborough line to call at the station.

There were two northbound platforms: platform 2 (now closed) was on the eastern side of an island platform and platform 3 on the opposite side (now renumbered 2); platform 1 handled southbound and eastbound trains. In addition, there was a single southbound line which passed in between platforms 1 and 2, rather than the two lines in place today. To relieve congestion on platform 1, there was a timber-built extension on the south curve (platform 1a) to allow Lincoln-bound trains to clear platform 1.

==== 1960s changes ====
The lower-level platforms (originally numbered 4 and 5, now renumbered 3 and 4) were added when the flat crossing between the two lines was removed and replaced with a bridge in 1965; the Sheffield-Gainsborough tracks lowered to pass beneath the main line.

These works also necessitated the removal of the direct north-to-east curve, meaning that trains between Sheffield and Lincoln could no longer call at the original platforms without a reversal. The curve connecting the Sheffield to Lincoln line to the current platform 2 is extant and is used by a limited number of trains each day.

=== Use of station buildings ===
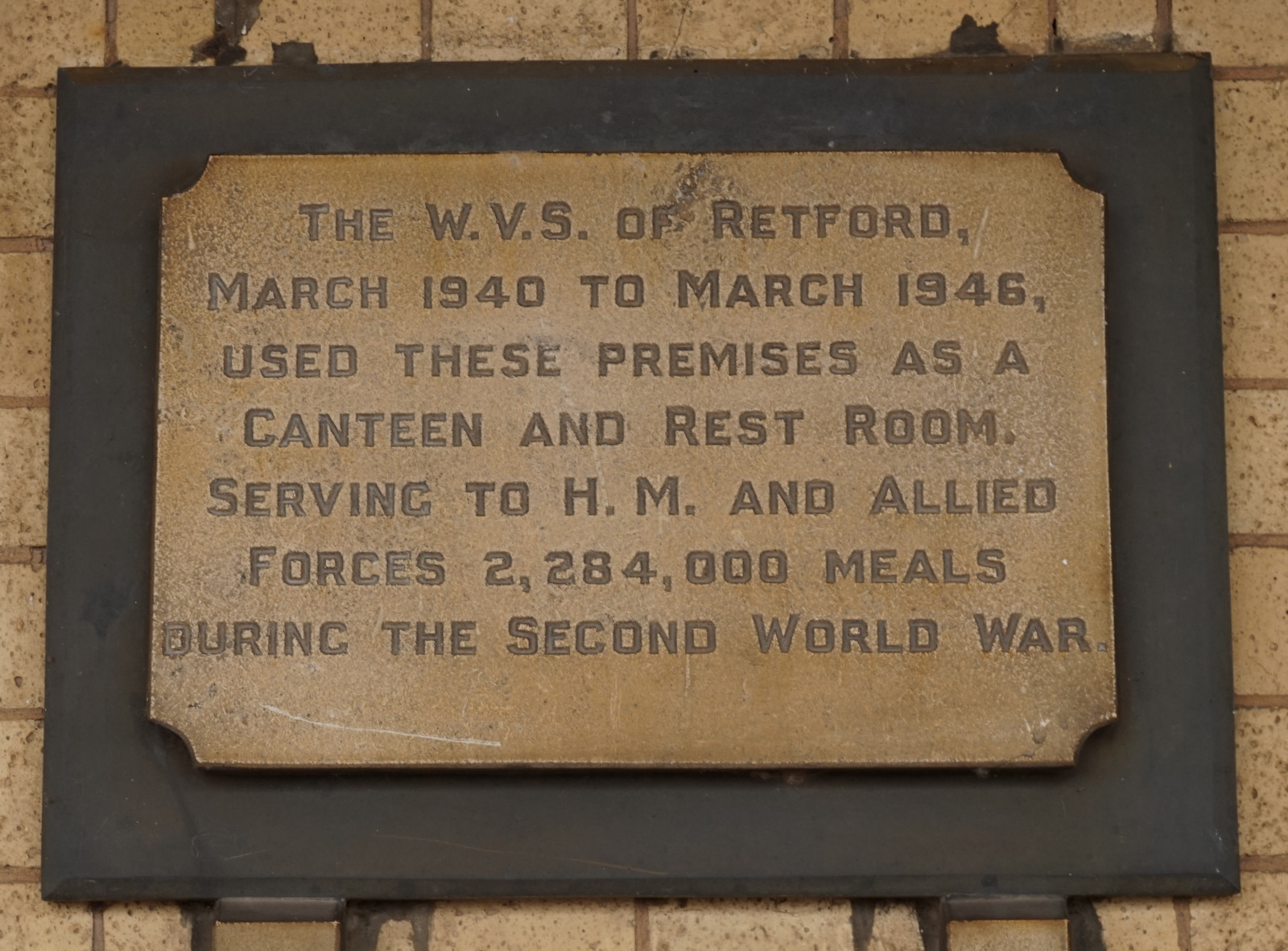
Plaque to the WVS on platform 1

==== Canteen and Rest Room ====
The work of the Women's Voluntary Services (WVS) of Retford at the station is celebrated with a plaque on platform 1, which states that between March 1940 and March 1946 they served 2,284,000 meals to HM and Allied Forces in the canteen and rest room.

==== Buffet and first class dining room ====
The former buffet and first class dining room, on platform 1, are currently used as clubrooms by the Bassetlaw (North Notts) Railway Society. The club has installed an interesting display of local railway images in the windows of the rooms.

==== Great North of England cattle market ====
The Great Northern and the Manchester, Sheffield & Lincolnshire Railway Companies put forward the idea of a ‘Great North of England Cattle Market’ next to the railway. By 1865, the Retford Cattle Company was holding markets on a site to the east of West Carr Road and north of the railway line. There was a public house next to this, known as the Cattle Market or Market Hotel; the building is extant.

=== Accidents and incidents ===
- 13 February 1923 - an express passenger train, hauled by ex-GNR Class C1 (large boiler) 4-4-2 no. 298, overran signals and was in a rear-end collision with a goods train. Three people were killed.
- 13 August 2014 - a man was killed after being struck by a train.
- 21 February 2019 - a 45-year-old woman died after being struck by a train in Retford.

== Layout ==
The station's high-level platforms (1 and 2) serve southbound and northbound East Coast Main Line trains; platform 1 (on the eastern side of the layout) adjoins the main station building. Between the two platforms tracks, there are two further lines, used by fast trains not booked to call here.

The station's low level platforms (3 & 4) lie on the Sheffield to Lincoln Line; they are served by Northern Trains.

In May 2019, significant improvements were made on the line as part of the new Northern Trains operator with services on the line being doubled, although these have since been reduced due to the COVID-19 pandemic.

== Facilities ==
The station is staffed throughout the week, with most amenities (booking office, toilets, coffee shop and vending machine) in the main building on platforms 1. The ticket office is staffed Monday to Friday 05:35-18:00, Saturday 05:35-16:10 and Sunday 08:20-16:10. A self-service ticket machine is also provided for use when the booking office is closed and for collecting pre-paid tickets. Train running information is offered via automated announcements, CIS displays and timetable posters. There are also customer help points on both low-level platforms, along with waiting shelters. All platforms are fully accessible for disabled passengers, via lifts and a subway.

In 2021, work was undertaken to make the low-level platforms fully accessible, funded by the UK Government's Access for All programme. Previously, only the Retford to Lincoln platform (platform 4) was accessible; the Retford to Sheffield platform (platform 3) had steps to the platform and a barrow crossing. It was originally intended that the improvement programme would be completed by July 2021, but the project was set back by flooding and finally concluded on 15 December. The programme included the addition of a covered walkway between the main line and the low-level platforms.

== Services ==
=== High-level ===
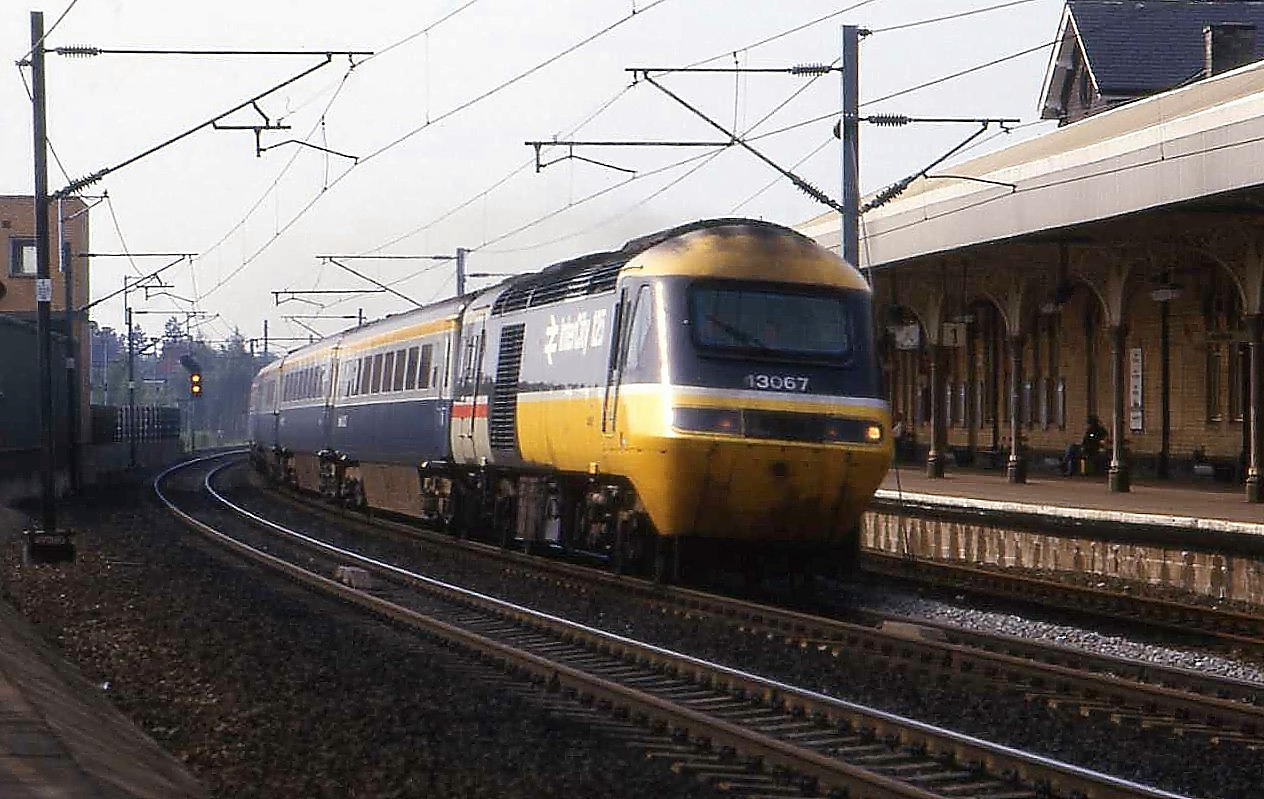
An InterCity 125 at the station, following electrification

These platforms are served by two train operating companies; the general off-peak service in trains per hour/day (tph/tpd) is:

London North Eastern Railway

- 1 tp2h to York
- 1 tpd to Aberdeen
- 1 tp2h to London King's Cross.

There are additional services at peak hours, including to Leeds, Skipton and Middlesbrough. At weekends, the frequency is the same although services usually run to Edinburgh or Leeds.

Services are operated using Class 800 bi-mode multiple units and Class 801 electric multiple units.

Hull Trains

- 7 tpd to Hull Paragon; of which:
  - 2 tpd continue to Beverley in the evenings
- 6 tpd to London King's Cross.

There is a reduced service in place at weekends.

Hull Trains proposed to operate two services per day to Sheffield from late 2025, under the brand of Sheffield by Hull Trains, which are planned to stop at Retford.

Services are operated using Class 802 bi-mode multiple units.

=== Low-level ===
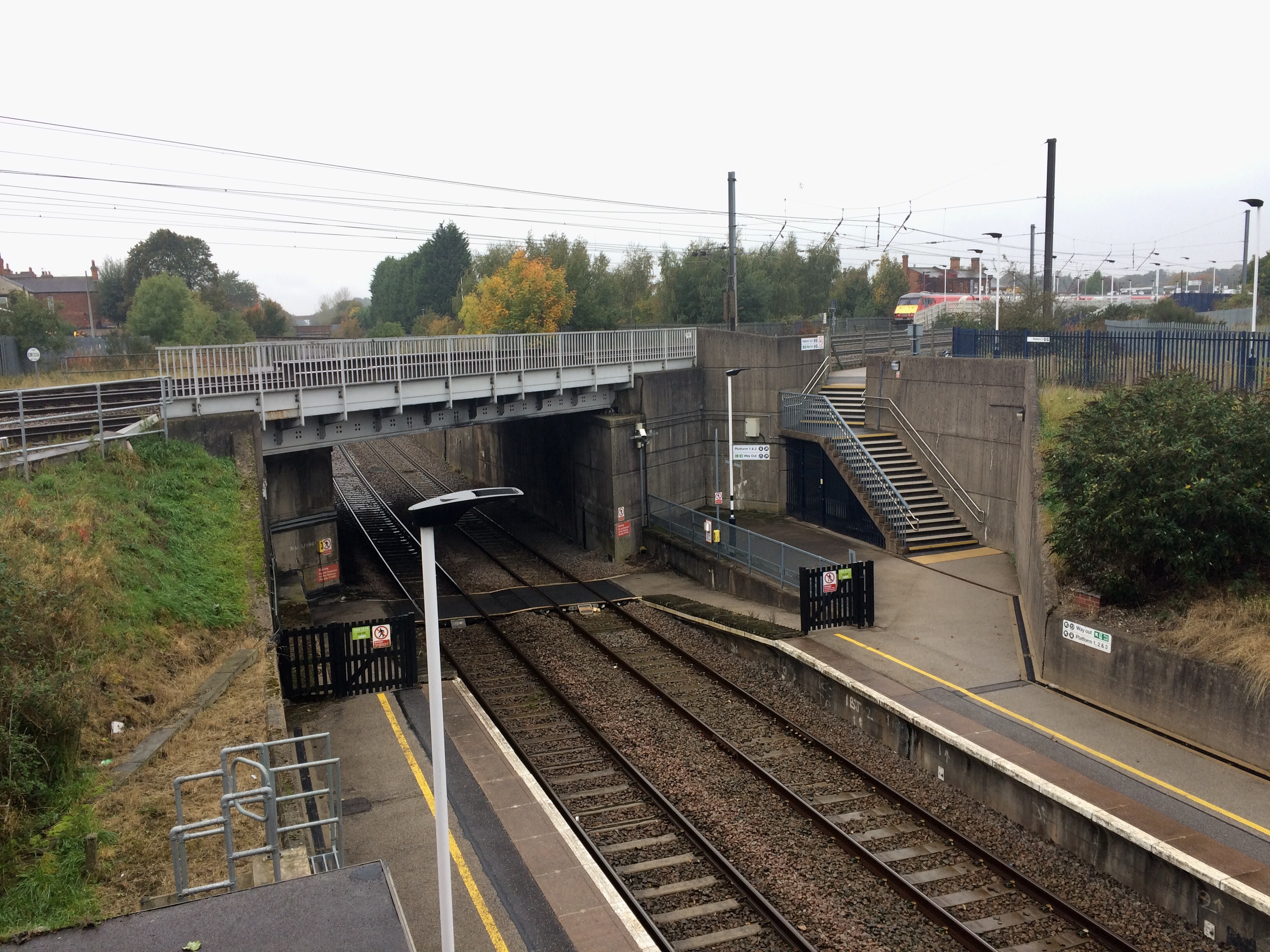
Retford low-level platform, showing the main line and the barrow crossing

Northern Trains operates all services on the low-level platforms:

- 1 tph to Leeds, via Sheffield
- 1 tph to Lincoln.

On Sundays, the station is served by an hourly service between Lincoln and Sheffield, with some services continuing to Huddersfield.

Services are operated using Class 150 and 195 diesel multiple units.

A small number of trains from Sheffield start/terminate here, including two that use the surviving connection via Whisker Hill Junction to reach platform 2 at High Level (a practice that was much more common in the 1970s when the Lincoln route had fewer through trains).

Preceding station	National Rail	Following station
Newark Northgate	London North Eastern Railway East Coast Main Line	Doncaster
Grantham	Hull Trains East Coast Main Line	Doncaster
Worksop	Northern Trains Brigg Branch Line Limited Service	Gainsborough Central
Worksop	Northern Trains Sheffield to Lincoln Line	Gainsborough Lea Road
	Proposed services	
London King's Cross	Sheffield by Hull Trains East Coast Main Line	Worksop
	Historical railways	
Tuxford North Line open, station closed	Great Northern Railway East Coast Main Line	Barnby Moor and Sutton Line open, station closed
Checker House Line open, station closed	Great Central Railway Sheffield and Lincolnshire Junction Railway	Sturton Line open, station closed
Checker House Line open, station closed	Great Central Railway Sheffield and Lincolnshire Extension Railway	Leverton Line and station closed

== In popular culture ==
Bill Bryson comments of Retford station, in his book Notes from a Small Island, that it is shown on railway maps in a typeface (and large filled circle graphic) marking it as equivalent to much more notable cities in northern England; he therefore deemed it worth a visit.

Michael Palin, of Monty Python fame, recalls frequently visiting Retford station as a youngster for trainspotting, as it was in easy reach of his home city of Sheffield and provided access to legendary locomotives like Flying Scotsman running on the East Coast Main Line.

== See also ==
- Listed buildings in Retford
