= Stow Park railway station =

Former railway station in Stow, Lincolnshire, England

Coordinates: 53.3231°N 0.7157°W

Stow Park
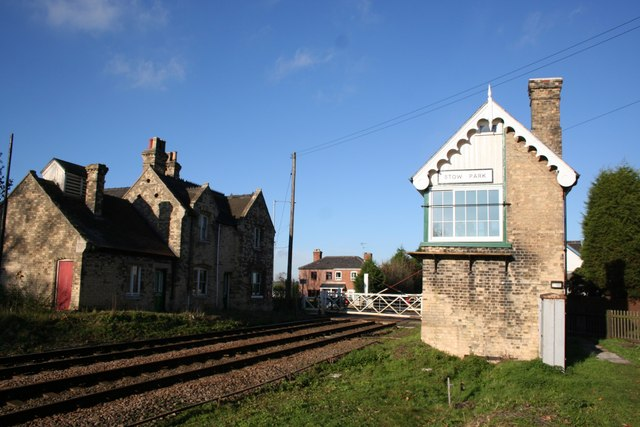
- Stow Park station site in 2006

General information
- Location: Stow, Lincolnshire, England

Other information
- Status: Disused

History
- Original company: Great Northern Railway
- Pre-grouping: Great Northern and Great Eastern Joint Railway
- Post-grouping: London and North Eastern Railway; Eastern Region of British Railways

Key dates
- 9 Apr 1849: Opened as Marton
- 1 Dec 1864: Closed
- 15 Jul 1867: Reopened
- 1 Dec 1871: Renamed Stow Park
- 11 Sep 1961: Closed
Location

Stow Park railway station was a railway station that served the villages of Marton and Stow in Lincolnshire, England on the line between Lincoln and Doncaster. It closed in 1961. The station and nearby signal box were listed in 1985.

Former Services

Preceding station	Historical railways	Following station
Lea Line open, station closed	Great Northern and Great Eastern Joint Railway	Saxilby Line and station open
