= Lea railway station =

Former railway station in Lincolnshire, England

Coordinates: 53.3601°N 0.7392°W

Lea railway station was a station in Lea, Lincolnshire, England, south of Gainsborough. It was opened in 1849 by the Great Northern Railway, but was closed to passengers in 1957 and closed entirely in 1963.

Preceding station	Historical railways	Following station
Gainsborough Lea Road Line and station open	Great Northern and Great Eastern Joint Railway	Stow Park Line open, station closed

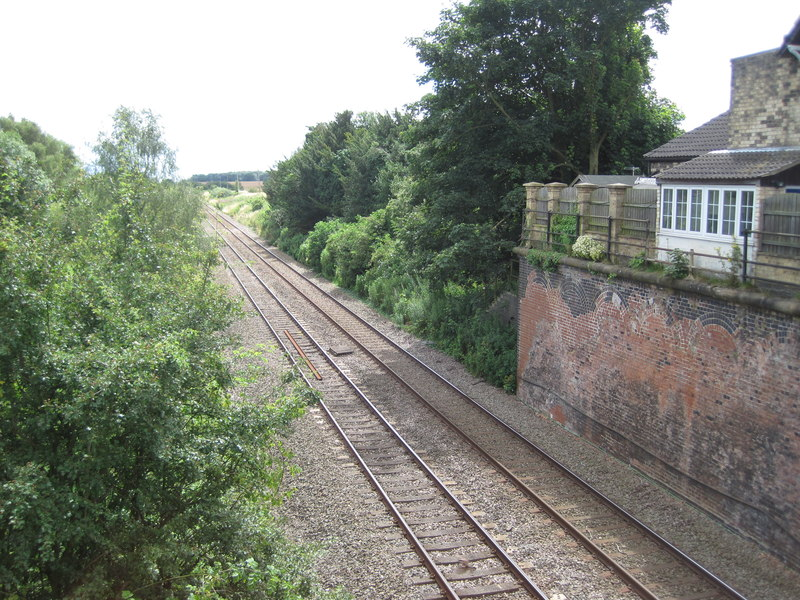
Site of station photographed from overbridge, 29 July 2012
