= Gainsborough Central railway station =

Railway station in Lincolnshire, England

Gainsborough Central
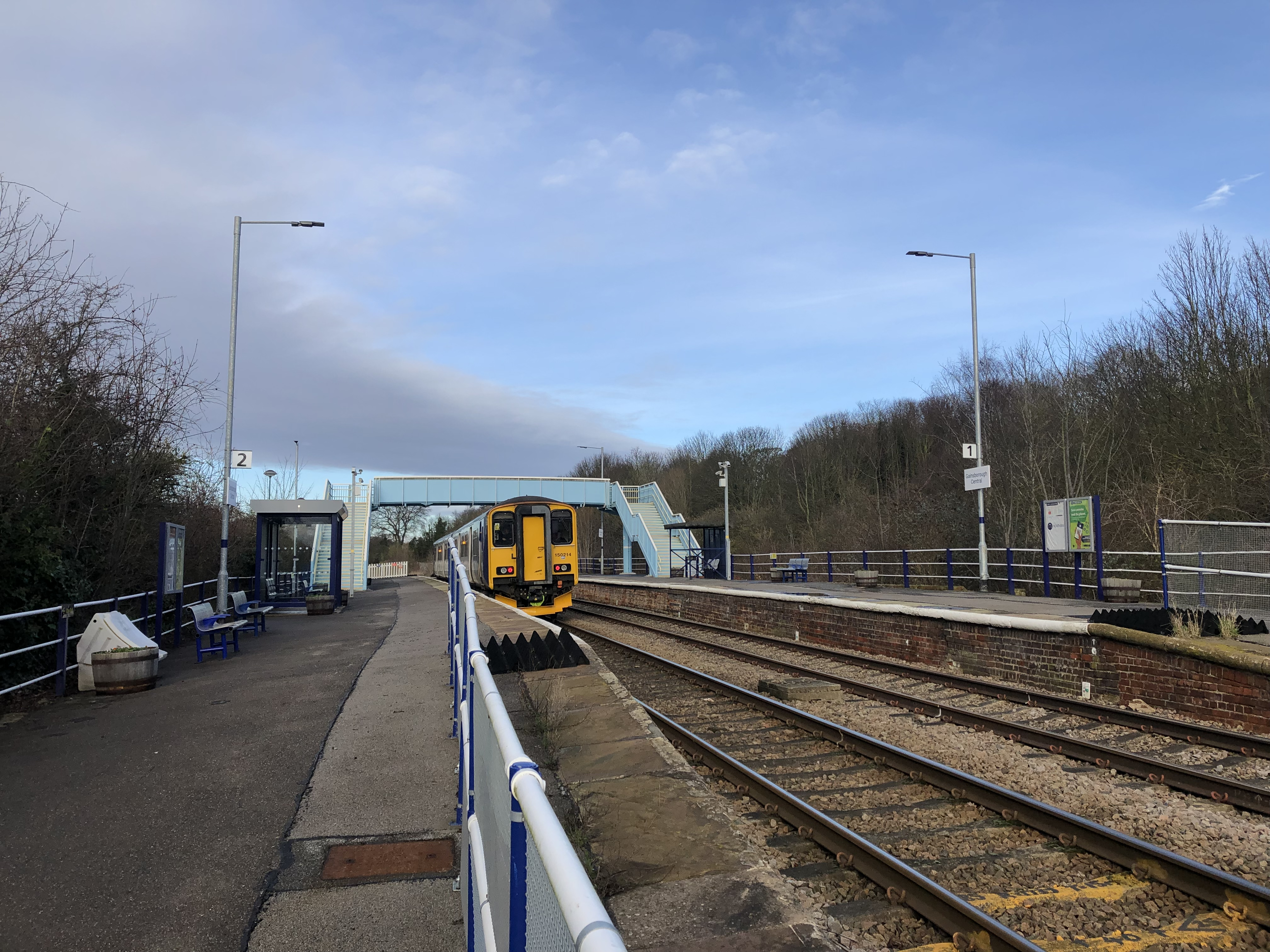
- The station in 2023.

General information
- Location: Gainsborough, West Lindsey; England
- Coordinates: 53.3990°N 0.7696°W
- Grid reference: SK819898
- Manager: Northern Trains
- Platforms: 2

Other information
- Station code: GNB
- Classification: DfT category F1

History
- Opened: 2 April 1849
- Original company: Manchester, Sheffield and Lincolnshire Railway
- Pre-grouping: Great Central Railway
- Post-grouping: London and North Eastern Railway

Key dates
- 2 April 1849: Opened as Gainsborough
- September 1923: Renamed Gainsborough Central

Passengers
- 2021/22: ▲1,830
- Interchange: ▲1,193
- 2022/23: ▲1,950
- Interchange: ▼83
- 2023/24: ▼1,676
- Interchange: ▼48
- 2024/25: ▲2,372
- Interchange: ▲57
- 2025/26: ▲4,746
- Interchange: ▲74
Location
Notes
- Passenger statistics from the Office of Rail and Road

Gainsborough Central railway station is one of two railway stations in the town of Gainsborough, Lincolnshire, England. The station is on the Brigg branch of the Sheffield–Lincoln line. Services are currently operated by Northern Trains.

The town's other station is the busier Gainsborough Lea Road.

== History ==
The station was opened by the Manchester, Sheffield and Lincolnshire Railway (MS&LR) on 2 April 1849. The opening day was a gala occasion, shops were closed and the town was full of visitors. The station, off Spring Gardens, was crowded with onlookers, and at noon the train whistle was heard in the distance. Some hundreds of people saw 'a veritable locomotive on a line of railway at Gainsborough' for the first time. It came over the track by a wooden trestle bridge across the Humble Carr and backed into the station. The directors of the line and the chief engineer were greeted by leading inhabitants and then went in procession to the old coaching inn, the White Hart, for a champagne lunch.

The station buildings were designed by architects Weightman and Hadfield. A substantial stone frontage with full-height portico with four attached Roman Ionic columns and triple arcade with moulded round arches.

The MS&LR became the Great Central Railway (GCR) on 1 August 1897, which in turn amalgamated with other railways to form the London and North Eastern Railway (LNER) at the end of 1922. The LNER inherited two stations in Gainsborough, and to distinguish them, the ex-GCR station was renamed Gainsborough Central in September 1923. The station buildings were demolished in 1975, leaving just the two platforms and a footbridge over the two railway lines.

Weekday passenger services (which had been thrice-daily each way between Sheffield and Cleethorpes since the early 1980s) were withdrawn by British Rail in October 1993 leaving only three trains in each direction running on Saturdays. In the Strategic Rail Authority's 2002/3 financial year, only five fare-paying passengers (excluding season ticket holders) boarded trains at Gainsborough Central station, and three disembarked, making it the least busy station in Great Britain, alongside Barry Links. The 2004/05 figures suggested 21 passengers used the station that year, putting it slightly above Watford West, a station which closed in 1996.

The line through the station was upgraded and refurbished in 2008 by contractors Arup and Carillon to allow it to carry increased levels of freight traffic from the port complex at Immingham to South Yorkshire and the East Midlands. This was done to reduce congestion on the busy route via Scunthorpe.

Meanwhile, the Friends of the Brigg and Lincoln Line, who come under the umbrella of the Lincolnshire Branch of Railfuture, was campaigning for the introduction of regular weekday services. This was finally achieved in May 2019 when Northern introduced an hourly service between Gainsborough Central and Sheffield on weekdays and Saturdays, the most regular service the station has received since 1849. Although it falls outside Northern's franchise commitments, the operator agreed to run the service without extra subsidy, with West Lindsey District Council agreeing to fund improvements to the station and signage. The new services utilise trains and crew which would otherwise have waited 40 minutes at Retford. Stopping at all stations, it now allows the Lincoln to Sheffield service to run non-stop between Worksop and Sheffield as part of the new Northern Connect network. Just eight months later however, the regular service was suspended again due to the COVID-19 pandemic in the United Kingdom, with a skeleton service resuming in May 2022.

== Location ==
Gainsborough Central station is situated close to Gainsborough steel stock holders (since moved) and the new Marshalls Yard Shopping Centre.

== Facilities ==
The station is unstaffed and has relatively basic facilities. The station has a self-service ticket machine for ticket purchases.

The station has a small cycle rack at the entrance and car parking is available at the nearby Marshalls Yard Shopping Centre.

Step-free access is available to both platforms at the station.

== Services ==
All services at Gainsborough Central are operated by Northern Trains.

As of 21 May 2023, there are two trains per day on weekdays, one to Cleethorpes and one to Sheffield. There is no weekend service.

This station had a more frequent service before the May 2023 timetable change with four trains per day on weekdays and Saturdays to Sheffield via Worksop which started and terminated here. There were also three trains on Saturdays between Sheffield and Cleethorpes via Brigg.

The nearby Gainsborough Lea Road is served regularly throughout the day, in the evenings and on Sundays.

Preceding station	National Rail	Following station
Retford	Northern Trains Brigg Branch Line Limited service	Kirton Lindsey
	Historical railways	
Sturton Line open, station closed	Great Central Railway Sheffield and Lincolnshire Junction Railway	Blyton Line open, station closed
