= Robert McGregor & Sons =

Robert McGregor & Sons Ltd
- Company type: Limited company
- Industry: Civil engineering
- Headquarters: Chaddock Lane, Boothstown, Walkden, Salford, England
- Area served: United Kingdom

Robert McGregor & Sons, also known just as Mc Gregor was a large civil engineering company based in Boothstown, in what is now Greater Manchester, England.

== History ==
It was founded in Manchester in 1927.

It specialised in building concrete surfaces for roads using a machine known as a concrete paver. It worked with the company Cementation Construction Ltd. It developed the CPP60 concrete paver.

It became part of Norwest Holst Civil Engineering, when bought in October 1978 for £3m.

== Structure ==
It was based on the A572 in Walkden in Greater Manchester (Salford). It also had a site in at Birdholme in Chesterfield, Derbyshire.

== Products ==
Roads it built include:

- A1(M) Birtley bypass (£2.5 million)
- A1 Grantham bypass, October 1962
- A1 Newark-on-Trent bypass, July 1964
- A1 Improvement from North of Muskham to South of Carlton including Cromwell By-pass, January 1966 (£772,000)
- A1 Sutton-on-Trent, Weston, and Tuxford By-Pass, July 1967, £4m
- A38 Alfreton-M1 bypass, opened in August 1969 as the A615
- A46 dualling between Six Hills (B676) and Widmerpool (A606), December 1965, £1.126 million
- A1 Eaton Socon bypass, 1971
- M56 North Cheshire Motorway, five miles from Lymm to Bowdon, opened July 1975

Constructions:

- Coedty Reservoir dam

== Sport ==
It founded the McGregor Trophy in Golf in 1982, initially held at Radcliffe-on-Trent Golf Club.
