= Gainsborough Lea Road railway station =

Railway station in Lincolnshire, England

Gainsborough Lea Road
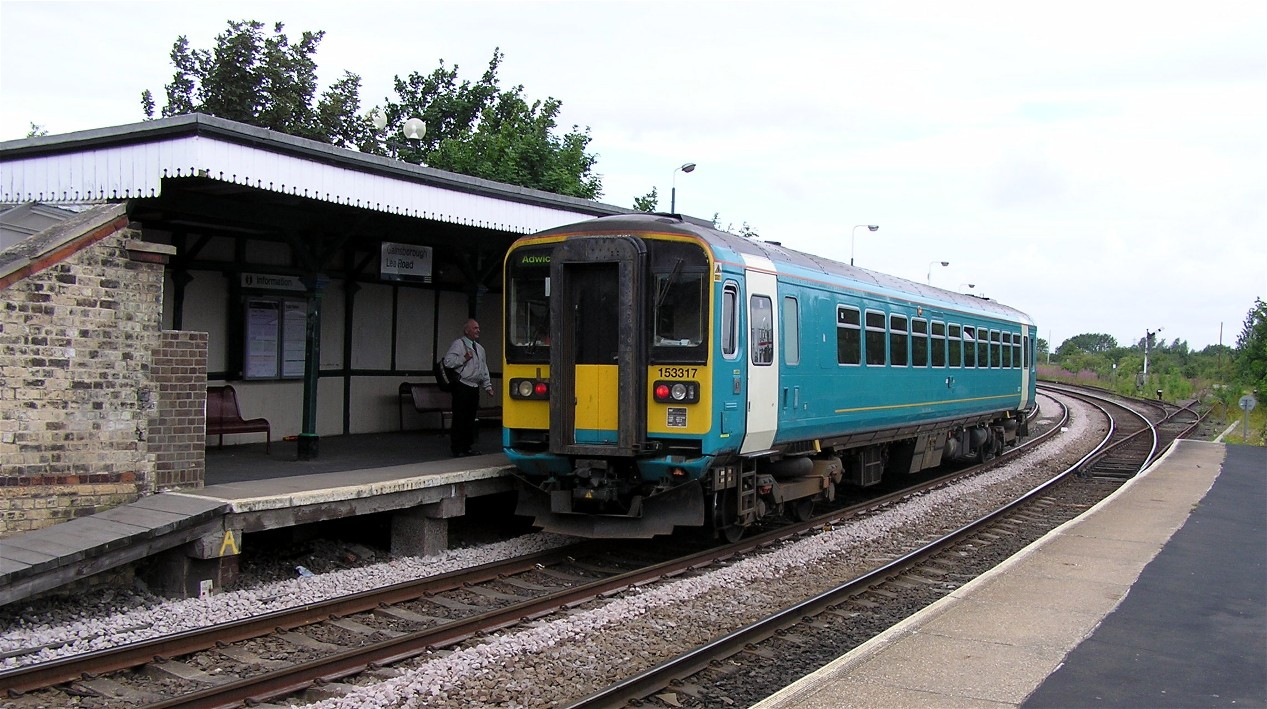
- Class 153 Super Sprinter at the station in 2005

General information
- Location: Gainsborough, West Lindsey; England
- Coordinates: 53.38600°N 0.76914°W
- Grid reference: SK819883
- Manager: East Midlands Railway
- Platforms: 2

Other information
- Station code: GBL
- Classification: DfT category F1

History
- Original company: Great Northern Railway
- Pre-grouping: Great Northern and Great Eastern Joint Railway
- Post-grouping: London and North Eastern Railway

Key dates
- 15 July 1867: Opened as Gainsborough
- 9 July 1923: Renamed Gainsborough North
- 1 December 1923: Renamed Gainsborough Lea Road

Passengers
- 2021/22: ▲0.146 million
- 2022/23: ▲0.169 million
- 2023/24: ▲0.185 million
- 2024/25: ▲0.211 million
- 2025/26: ▲0.222 million
- Interchange: 111
Location
Notes
- Passenger statistics from the Office of Rail and Road

Gainsborough Lea Road (originally opened as Gainsborough and briefly known as Gainsborough North) is one of two railway stations that serve the town of Gainsborough in Lincolnshire, England, the other being Gainsborough Central, which is located in the town centre. The station is managed by East Midlands Railway and is located 14 1/4 miles (23 km) northwest of Lincoln Central on the A156 Lea Road in the south of the town. It opened in 1867 on a single line of the Great Northern Railway, who ran four trains a day from Gainsborough to Lincoln.

== History ==
=== Opening ===
The first station at Gainsborough was the current Central station opened on 2 April 1849 by the Manchester Sheffield and Lincoln railway. Initially a terminus this became a through station when the line was extended to Woodhouse and Retford on 16 July 1849. On 9 April 1849 a single-track line built by the Great Northern Railway (GNR) from Lincoln to west of the station and GNR trains serving Gainsborough reversed here. Following the opening of the MSLR line to Retford, GNR services then ran to Retford although the reversal into Gainsborough Central was still required.

The GNR was keen to extend their line from Gainsborough to Doncaster and parliamentary approval for this line was received on 25 July 1864. As part of this scheme the existing Lincoln to Gainsborough line was also to be upgraded. On 1 December that year the line from Lincoln to Doncaster was closed and doubling took place. At this time the new station, initially called Gainsborough, was built and trains started calling there on 15 July 1867.

On 1 March 1871 a line was opened from north of the station to the bank of the River Trent serving Ashcroft Saw Mill and an iron works.

=== Great Northern and Great Eastern Joint Railway ===
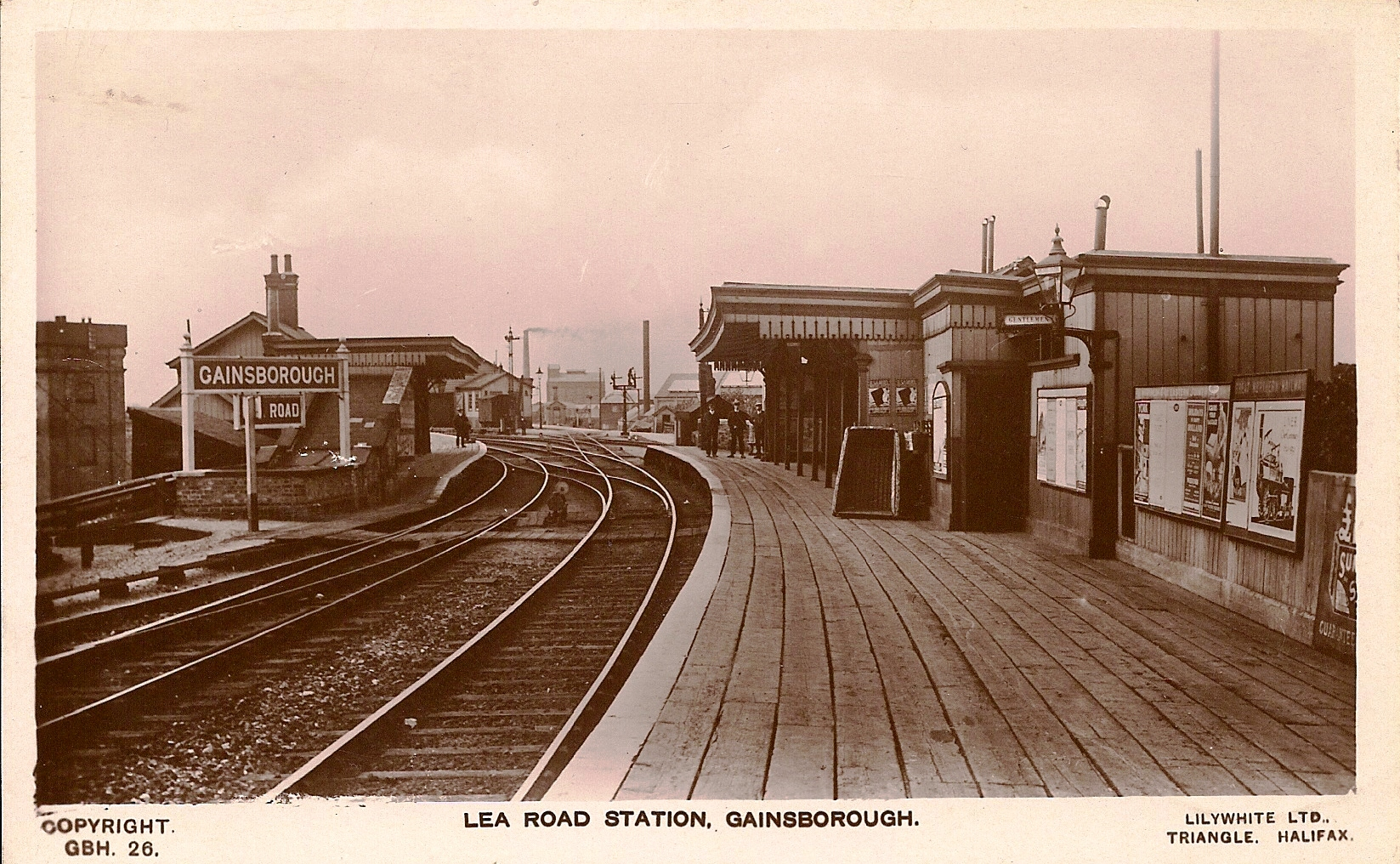
Gainsborough Lea Road railway station in the early 1900s

In 1879 the GNR and the Great Eastern Railway (GER) formed a committee to build a line linking the coal fields of south Yorkshire to London. This saw the building of a new line from Spalding North Junction to Pyewipe Junction near Lincoln which opened in stages in 1882. The station was transferred to the Great Northern and Great Eastern Joint Railway committee.

Passenger facilities were improved in 1883 and 1884, and goods facilities expanded in 1886 and 1891 with a number of rail connected businesses operated in the station area. In 1909 the joint committee was abandoned and although the station remained in Joint ownership, it was managed by the GNR.

=== London and North Eastern Railway ===
The GNR amalgamated with several other railways to form the London and North Eastern Railway on 1 January 1923. On 9 July the station was renamed Gainsborough North although this name was short-lived as the station was renamed Gainsborough Lea Road on 1 December.

In the Second World War the joint line saw significant freight traffic and passenger services were reduced as a result.

=== British Railways ===
Following nationalisation of the railways in 1948 Gainsborough Lea Road became part of the Eastern Region of British Railways.

The goods yard remained active during the 1950s but falling traffic saw closure on 1 April 1967.

== Services ==
=== Winter 1890 services ===
Passenger services in the Winter 1890 services included several express services operated by the Great Eastern Railway supplemented by local trains between Lincoln and Doncaster operated by the GNR. there was also a Peterborough–Doncaster local service (GNR) and march – Doncaster local service operated by the GER.

The express services were:

- 2 × Liverpool Street – Doncaster
- Harwich – Doncaster
- March – Doncaster (portion from Harwich to Manchester North Country Continental service)

There were a number of goods services: GER services generally running between Whitemoor (a large marshalling yard located north of March in Cambridgeshire) and Doncaster. GNR goods services ran from Doncaster to/from a variety of destinations including Lincoln, Louth, Peterborough and Grantham.

=== Modern-day services ===
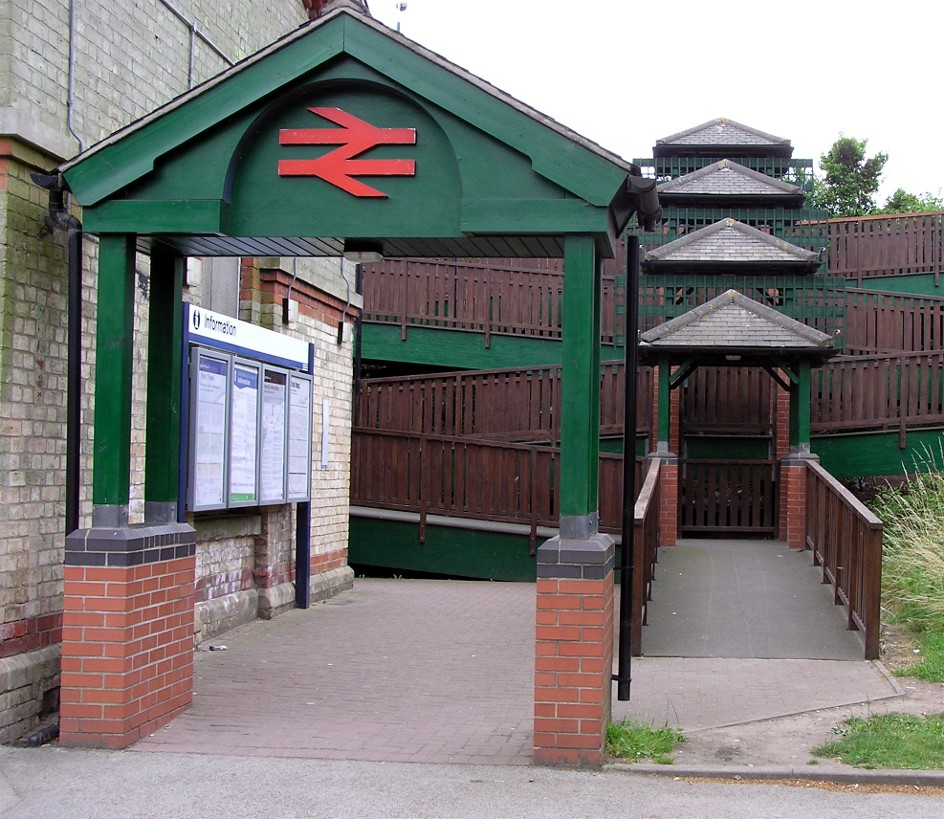
Lea Road Station entrance

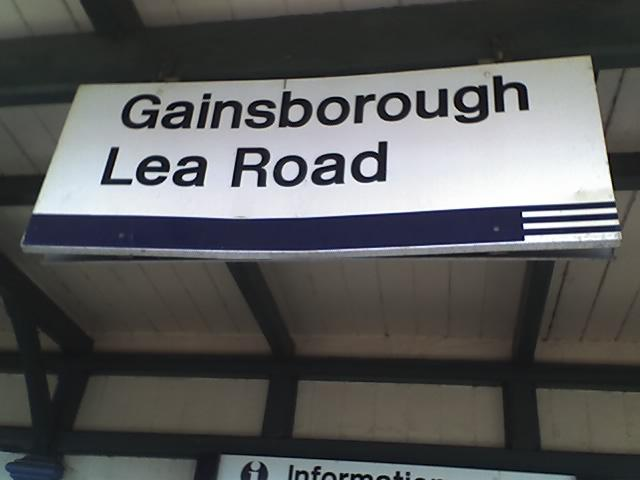
The station sign

Services at Gainsborough Lea Road are operated by Northern Trains and East Midlands Railway.

On weekdays and Saturdays, the station is generally served by an hourly Northern Trains service between Lincoln and Leeds via Retford and Sheffield. There are also, around, five return services per day between Doncaster and Lincoln with the first, northbound, train originating in Peterborough and travelling via Sleaford to Doncaster. These services are operated by East Midlands Railway.

On Sundays, there is generally an hourly service between Lincoln and Sheffield, with some services continuing to and from Huddersfield. There are no Sunday services to Doncaster or Peterborough.

Preceding station	National Rail	Following station
Doncaster	East Midlands Railway: Doncaster–Lincoln line; Monday-Saturday only	Saxilby
Retford	Northern Trains Sheffield–Lincoln line	Saxilby
	Historical railways	
Terminus	Great Northern Railway Lincolnshire Loop Line	Lea Line open, station closed
Beckingham Line open, station closed	Great Northern and Great Eastern Joint Railway Doncaster-Lincoln-Huntingdon	Lea Line open, station closed

==== Potential Future services ====
In April 2019, the DfT announced that Abellio had won its bid for the East Midlands franchise, after Stagecoach was disqualified from the process due to not meeting pension obligations. The service will be renamed "East Midlands Railway" and the contract is due to last until August 2027. As part of this takeover Abellio have pledged to run hourly Peterborough–Lincoln–Doncaster through-service from December 2021, and introduce a new Sunday service between Lincoln and Doncaster, all of which will be operated by refurbished, modern trains with more reliable service, free on-board Wi-Fi and at-seat power sockets.

There have been calls from the local rail users group for the station to receive a direct service to London King's Cross, which would be provided by extending the current London North Eastern Railway service between London & Lincoln Central (the set for which currently runs empty to/from Neville Hill depot at Leeds and passes through the station en route to Lincoln), or by Hull Trains providing services between London and Hull via Lincoln. The operator has yet to formally respond to these proposals.

== Signal Boxes ==
When the station opened in 1877 a signal box called Gainsborough South was provided. there was also a signal box at Gainsborough North which controlled access to the goods yard and Trent branch (known as Lower yard) South signal box was renamed Lea Road in 1895 when it had a new lever frame made by Evans, O' Donnell & Co fitted. North box was replaced by a ground frame.

On 11 February 2009 Gainsborough Lea Road signal box was badly damaged by fire. The block section (this is the area between signals controlled by different signal boxes) was extended to between Stow Park (southwards) and Gainsborough Trent Junction to the north. The route was upgraded during 2012 and 2013 as part of a £280 million project to relieve the East Coast Main Line of freight. This included new colour light signalling and the signal boxes at Stow Park and Gainsborough Lea Rd officially closed in January 2014 with the new signalling controlled from Lincoln Control Centre.
