= Worksop railway station =

Railway station in Nottinghamshire, England

Worksop
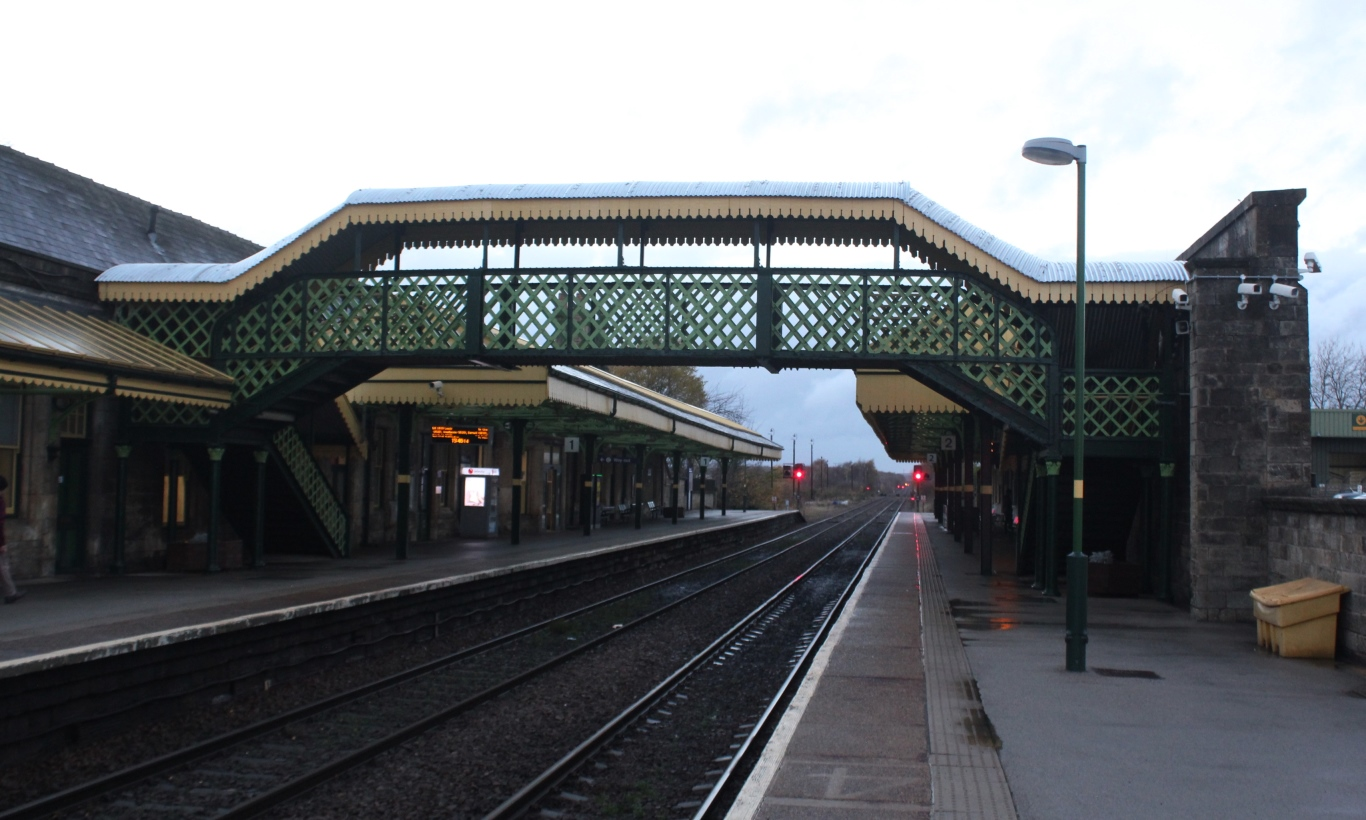
- The station in 2018

General information
- Location: Worksop, Bassetlaw; England
- Coordinates: 53.311667°N 1.122778°W
- Grid reference: SK585797
- Manager: Northern Trains
- Platforms: 2

Other information
- Station code: WRK
- Classification: DfT category E

History
- Opened: 7 July 1849

Passengers
- 2020/21: ▼0.116 million
- Interchange: ▼8,814
- 2021/22: ▲0.365 million
- Interchange: ▲24,377
- 2022/23: ▲0.420 million
- Interchange: ▲26,663
- 2023/24: ▲0.457 million
- Interchange: ▲30,770
- 2024/25: ▲0.515 million
- Interchange: ▲33,938

Listed Building – Grade II
- Feature: Worksop Station, House and Outbuildings, Carlton Road
- Designated: 10 Apr 1975
- Reference no.: 1045024
Location
Notes
- Passenger statistics from the Office of Rail and Road

Worksop railway station is a Grade II listed railway station which serves the town of Worksop in Nottinghamshire, England.

== History ==
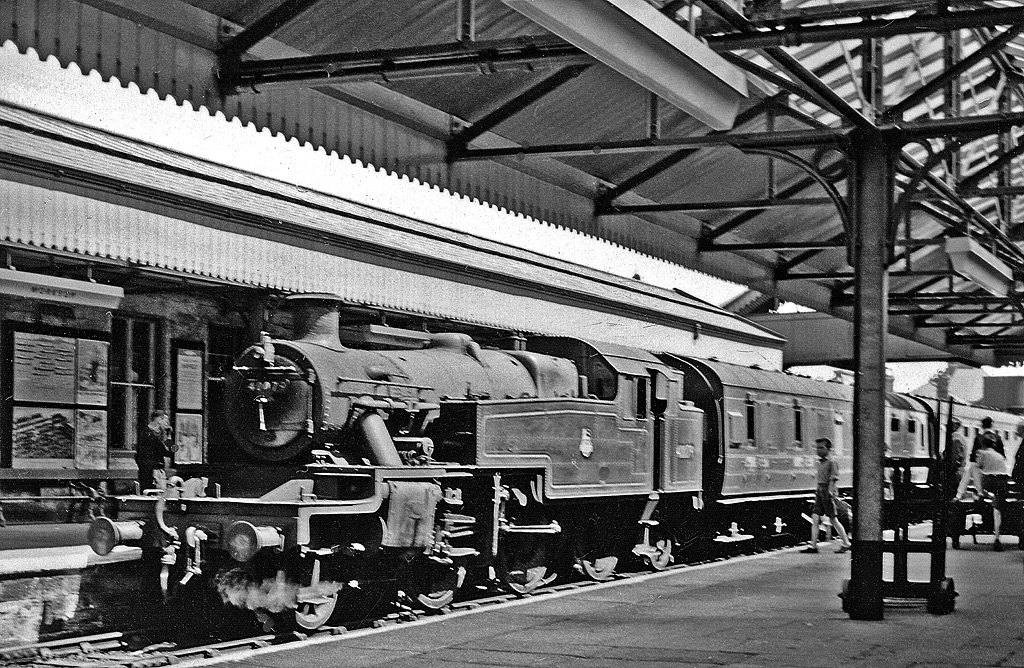
Worksop Station in 1957

The station was designed by Weightman & Hadfield, Sheffield in the Jacobean style, and built by James Drabble, Carlton in Lindrick. It was opened on 7 July 1849 by the Sheffield and Lincolnshire Junction Railway, part of the Manchester, Sheffield and Lincolnshire Railway. It was extended and further buildings added in 1900.

It is today an intermediate stop on the regional service between Lincoln Central and Leeds (15 3/4 miles (25.3 km) from Sheffield) operated by Northern Trains, and is the northern terminus of East Midlands Railway' Robin Hood Line between Worksop and Nottingham via Mansfield (the section from the latter town was re-opened to passengers on 25 May 1998, after originally losing them to the Beeching Axe in October 1964). Northern runs the booking office on platform 1, Network Rail has office accommodation on platform 1 and the remaining rooms are let out as private commercial premises including a small pub. Platform 2 formerly housed the Railway Cafe before its closure.

Worksop Power signal box (PSB), which was opened in 1998, is located at the western end of the station on the Retford-bound platform, and there are a number of goods loops and sidings close by that were previously used for stabling and reversing/recessing coal trains that served nearby power stations at West Burton and Cottam. Due to the closure of the power stations and nearby coalfields the sidings are now used for the repair and storage of rolling stock by HNRC Swietelsky. Platform 2 has a turnback facility provided, so that terminating trains from the west and south can terminate and start back from there without having to change lines and use the level crossing at the eastern end.

== Facilities ==
The station is staffed part-time (ticket office open Monday - Friday 07:00 - 17:00, Saturday 07:00 - 13:30, closed Sundays); self-service ticket machines are also provided for use outside these times and for collecting advance-purchase tickets. Refreshment facilities are available via a cafe on platform 2, a public house on platform 1 and from vending machines on both sides. Canopies provide covered waiting areas on both platforms – these are also fully accessible for disabled passengers. Train running information is offered via automatic announcements, timetable posters and digital display screens.

The station went through authentic restoration works in early to mid 2018 with a new authentic colour scheme which was used when the station first opened in the 19th century.

== Services ==
Services at Worksop are operated by Northern Trains and East Midlands Railway.

The typical off-peak service in trains per hour is:

- 1 tph to Leeds via Sheffield
- 1 tph to Lincoln via Retford
- 1 tph to Nottingham

The station is also served by a single daily return service to and from Cleethorpes on weekdays only.

On Sundays, the station is served by an hourly service between Lincoln and Sheffield, with some services continuing to Huddersfield. There are no Sunday services to Nottingham.

There is an ongoing proposition by FirstGroup's Hull Trains to begin a new service between London King's Cross to Sheffield, stopping at Worksop station, giving Worksop its first direct service to London in decades. If this plan were to go ahead, FirstGroup predicts its operations to begin by 2025.

Preceding station	National Rail	Following station
Shireoaks	Northern Trains Sheffield to Lincoln Line	Retford
Whitwell or Creswell	East Midlands Railway: Robin Hood Line; Monday-Saturday only	Terminus
	Proposed services	
Woodhouse	Sheffield by Hull Trains East Coast Main Line	Retford

== See also ==
- Listed buildings in Worksop
