= Sheffield and Lincolnshire Junction Railway =

UK railway company

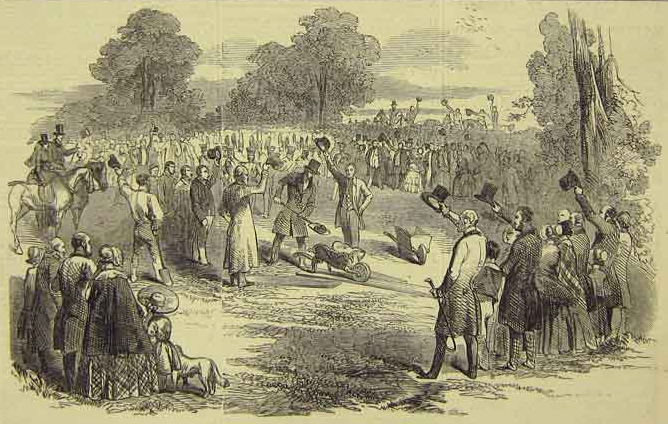
- Cutting the first sod of the railway, in 1846

Overview
- Dates of operation: 1846–1847
- Successor: Manchester, Sheffield and Lincolnshire Railway

Technical
- Track gauge: 4 ft 8 1/2 in (1,435 mm)

The Sheffield and Lincolnshire Junction Railway was an early British railway company which opened in 1849 between Sheffield and Gainsborough and Lincoln. It amalgamated with the Sheffield, Ashton-Under-Lyne and Manchester Railway and the Great Grimsby and Sheffield Junction Railway, the three being renamed the Manchester, Sheffield and Lincolnshire Railway in 1847. It is now the Sheffield to Lincoln Line.

== Plans ==
The line originated with a plan in 1836 to connect the SA&MR at Sheffield with the proposed Midland Counties Railway at a time when the latter was planning to run to Chesterfield. This was changed to proposal for Sheffield Union Railway to connect instead with the North Midland Railway at Woodhouse Mill. This plan, in turn, was superseded by one for a connection to Chesterfield. At this point, in 1844, it was suggested that the people of Sheffield would be better served by extending the SA&MR eastwards. This was supported, not only by the SA&MR, but by the councillors of Retford and Worksop.

== Authorisation ==
Sheffield and Lincolnshire Junction Railway Act 1846
- Act of Parliament
- Parliament of the United Kingdom
- Long title: An Act for making a Railway from Sheffield to Gainsborough, with Branches.
- Citation: 9 & 10 Vict. c. ccciv

Dates
- Royal assent: 3 August 1846

Other legislation
- Repealed by: Manchester, Sheffield and Lincolnshire Railway Act 1849

Status: Repealed

The line received approval in the Sheffield and Lincolnshire Junction Railway Act 1846 (9 & 10 Vict. c. ccciv), along with the Sheffield and Lincolnshire Extension Railway, which was the branch to Lincoln, which would run from near Retford. Parliamentary decree meant that the way from Saxilby to Lincoln would be shared with the Great Northern. The latter built this part of the line and shared it with the S&LE with the agreement that it could have running powers from Retford to Sheffield.

== Construction ==
The first board meeting of the amalgamated Manchester, Sheffield and Lincolnshire Railway took place on 6 January 1847. Construction had begun on 15 October 1846 with the section between Sheffield and to what was by then the Midland Railway at Beighton. The final link in the line between Sheffield and Gainsborough was completed in 1849 with stations at Kiveton Park, Shireoaks, Worksop, Retford and Sturton.

== Officers ==
- John Jobson Smith (Chairman)
- John Woodcroft (Deputy Chairman)
- John Hambly Humfrey (Secretary)
- John Fowler (Engineer)
