= Barnetby railway station =

Railway station in Lincolnshire, England

Barnetby
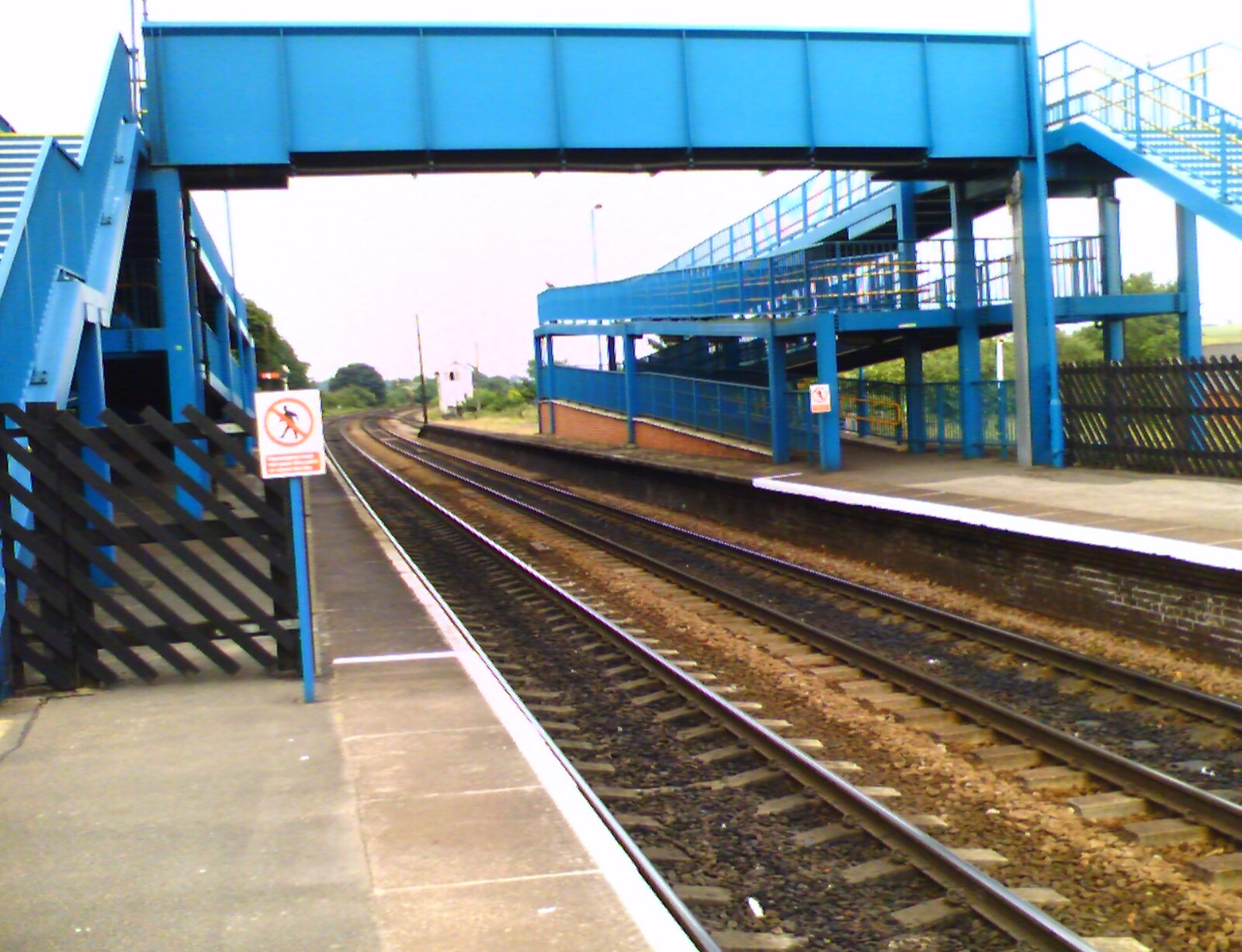
- Pedestrian bridge over platforms

General information
- Location: Barnetby-le-Wold, North Lincolnshire; England
- Coordinates: 53.57503°N 0.40990°W
- Grid reference: TA053098
- Managed by: TransPennine Express
- Platforms: 4

Other information
- Station code: BTB
- Classification: DfT category F1

History
- Opened: 1848

Passengers
- 2020/21: ▼9,760
- Interchange: ▼1,057
- 2021/22: ▲42,282
- Interchange: ▲2,865
- 2022/23: ▲42,462
- Interchange: ▲3,862
- 2023/24: ▲52,328
- Interchange: ▲4,343
- 2024/25: ▲61,434
- Interchange: ▲4,740
Location
Notes
- Passenger statistics from the Office of Rail and Road

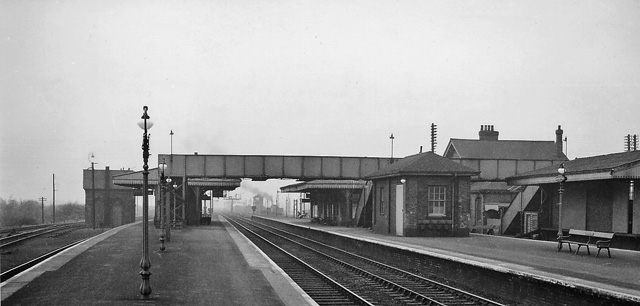
View in 1961 towards Lincoln/Retford/Doncaster

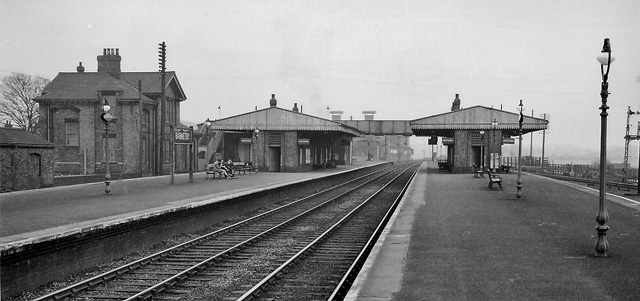
View in 1962 towards Immingham and Grimsby

Barnetby railway station serves the village of Barnetby-le-Wold in North Lincolnshire, England. It is operated by TransPennine Express, with East Midlands Railway and Northern Trains also serving the station.

Barnetby railway station is unstaffed, and is popular with railway enthusiasts for the freight which passes through. It is also the closest station to Humberside Airport, located 2 1/2 miles (4.0 km) to the east.

== History ==
The railway first came to Barnetby in 1848 when the Great Grimsby and Sheffield Junction Railway was constructed. This line ran from Sheffield, through Retford, Torksey, Lincoln and Market Rasen before reaching Barnetby – then on to Grimsby. A year later, the section of route between Gainsborough and Barnetby was opened, establishing the village's future as a railway centre. The most important connection – and still is to this day - was the building of the Trent, Ancholme and Grimsby Railway in 1866 – through the steel town of Scunthorpe. Over the following years, these railways – and several others became part of the Great Central Railway (GCR).

The Great Central Railway recognised the importance of the Humber ports. As well as developing Grimsby, the company invested heavily in Immingham Docks was unique among the Humber ports in that a deep water channel made easy access for ships at all states of the tide. This suited the GCR as one of its chief flows of traffic was coal from the South Yorkshire and East Midlands coal-fields.

With the increased traffic through Barnetby, the track infrastructure needed more investment. At the time, Barnetby had a fairly simple layout based on a standard double track. It even had a level crossing near to where the Kings Road bridge is today. To make passage easier, the GCR invested in the quadrupling of the track between Wrawby Junction and Brocklesby Junction – together with much improved signalling. The level crossing was removed and the Kings Road underbridge was built. To handle the traffic, new signal boxes were built at Wrawby Junction, Barnetby West, Barnetby East, Melton Ross and Brocklesby Junction.

In 1923, the Great Central Railway became part of the London and North Eastern Railway in 1948 part of British Railways. In 1994 the infrastructure came under the ownership part of Railtrack and in 2002, Network Rail.

Whilst most railway freight traffic passes through the village, in years past the village generated a small amount of its own business. The nearby malt kiln was opened in 1875, and the village cattle market used rail transport. The cattle market is long gone and the malt kiln demolished. The station's platform buildings (waiting rooms, toilets etc.) were demolished in the late 1980s and replaced by shelters, but the main building next to the footbridge still stands (it is used as office accommodation by Network Rail).

During World War II, Barnetby served as the railhead used for nearby RAF Elsham Wolds, a bomber base. Arriving and departing personnel could be picked up or dropped off by RAF vans. Australian Don Charlwood, in his memoir, "No Moon Tonight," writes movingly of standing on the platform with 20 other young men, part of four newly arrived crews for RAF bombers flying night raids on Germany from Elsham Wolds. While they waited for the van, ". . . we stood on the platform looking up at the hills that rose gently from every side." Casualties in Bomber Command were heavy: ". . . of our twenty only eight were destined to depart Barnetby station a few months later."

A serious accident occurred near the station in 1983, when one passenger died after a freight and passenger train collided. In 2001 a new footbridge complete with ramps was built.

The lines through the station were re-signalled over the Christmas and New Year of 2015/16, with the new colour light signals installed and the old manual signal boxes at Wrawby Junction and Barnetby East closed during a 17-day blockade. The area is now under the control of the York IECC.

== Facilities ==
The station is unstaffed as noted, but has a self-service ticket machine, accepting card payments only, to allow passengers to buy tickets prior to departure or for the collection of pre-paid tickets. Passengers paying by other methods (e.g. cash) must buy their ticket from the conductor on the train. There are waiting shelters on each island platform (but no other permanent buildings), along with customer help points, digital information screens and timetable poster boards. Step-free access is available to all platforms via the fully accessible footbridge from the car park and station entrance.

== Services ==
Services at the station are operated by East Midlands Railway, Northern Trains and TransPennine Express.

On weekdays, the station is served by an hourly TransPennine Express service between Cleethorpes and Liverpool Lime Street as well as by a two-hourly East Midlands Railway service between Cleethorpes and Matlock via Lincoln and Nottingham. There is also a single daily service between Cleethorpes and Sheffield via Brigg which is operated by Northern Trains. On Saturdays, there are three East Midlands Railway services to Cleethorpes.

On Sundays, the TransPennine Express service is two-hourly in the morning but increases to hourly in the afternoon. There are three East Midlands Railway services between Nottingham and Cleethorpes during the summer months only with no service during the winter.

Preceding station	National Rail	Following station
Market Rasen	East Midlands Railway Grimsby–Lincoln–Newark line	Habrough
Scunthorpe	TransPennine Express: South Humberside Main Line; (South TransPennine)	Habrough
Brigg	Northern Trains Brigg Branch Line Limited Service	Grimsby Town
	Historical railways	
Elsham Line open, station closed	Great Central Railway Trent, Ancholme and Grimsby Railway	Terminus
Terminus	Great Central Railway Great Grimsby and Sheffield Junction Railway	Bigby Road Bridge Line open, station closed
Brigg Line and station open	Regional Railways Brigg Branch Line	Brocklesby Line open, station closed

== Gallery ==
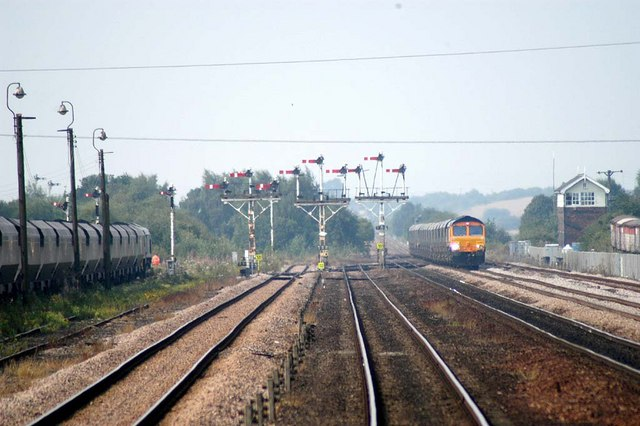
Semaphore Signals towards Wrawby Junction

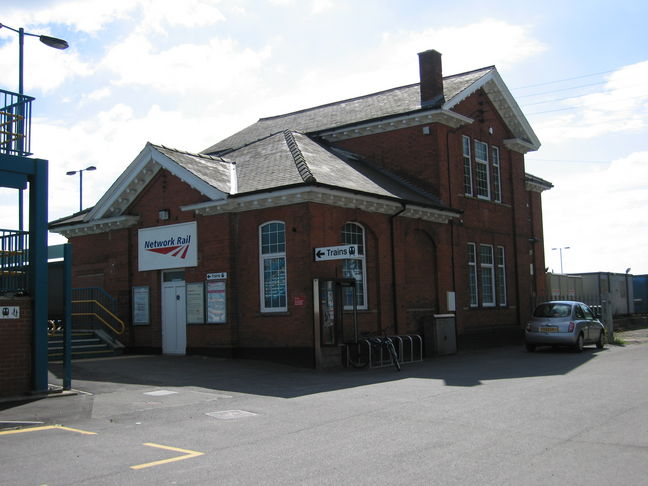
The station building
