= St Mary's Church, Barnetby =

Coordinates: 53.5676°N 0.3986°W

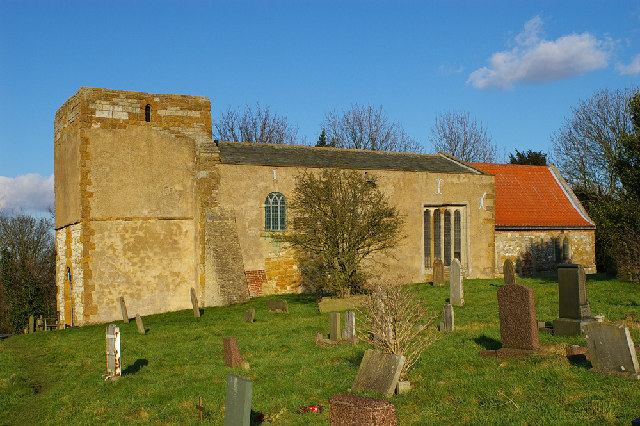
- St Mary's Church, Barnetby, from the south

- Location in Lincolnshire
- OS grid reference: TA 061 091
- Location: Barnetby, Lincolnshire
- Country: England
- Denomination: Anglican
- Website: Churches Conservation Trust

Architecture
- Functional status: Redundant
- Heritage designation: Grade I
- Designated: 6 November 1967
- Architectural type: Church
- Style: Anglo-Saxon, Norman, Gothic

Specifications
- Materials: Ironstone, chalk, limestone and brick. Slate and tile roofs

St Mary's Church is a redundant Anglican church in the village of Barnetby, Lincolnshire, England. It is recorded in the National Heritage List for England as a designated Grade I listed building, and is under the care of the Churches Conservation Trust.

== History ==
The church dates from the 11th century, and some of the remaining fabric in the south wall of the nave is Anglo-Saxon. The tower was built in the 11th–12th century, and the tower arch, the north arcade, and the chancel date from the 13th century. More alterations were made in the 17th and 18th centuries, including the demolition of the north aisle, and the addition of a new east window to the chancel. In 1829 a gallery and a gallery window were added to the nave. Other alterations made during the 19th century include the replacement of the south porch with buttresses. During the 20th century some rendering was applied to the exterior of the church, and further repairs were carried out.

In 1927, the congregation stopped meeting in St Mary's, and began using St Barnabas church, a brick structure half a mile away in Barnetby. St Mary's fell into disuse, was declared redundant in 1972, and the Churches Conservation Trust now cares for it.

In his well-regarded memoir, "No Moon Tonight, " Don Charlwood, an Australian navigator in RAF Bomber Command at nearby RAF Elsham Wolds in World War II, refers, movingly and repeatedly, to visits to St. Mary's.

== Architecture ==
=== Exterior ===
St Mary's is constructed in a mixture of ironstone, chalk, limestone, and red and yellow brick. Cement rendering has been applied to parts of the nave and the tower. The roof of the nave is slated, and the roof of the chancel is tiled. The plan of the church consists of a three-bay nave, a three-bay chancel, and a west tower. The squat-looking tower is in two stages on a plinth. It has quoins and a moulded string course. In the west side of the lower stage is a round-headed doorway, over which is a small lancet window. In the upper stage there are small round-headed bell openings on the west and south sides, and a square-headed bell opening on the north side. In the north wall of the nave are the remains of two arcade arches, a 15th-century three-light window under a segmental arch containing Perpendicular tracery, and two plain three-light windows with mullions. On the south side of the nave are two buttresses between which is a round-headed gallery window. To the east of these are a narrow 11th-century round-headed window with a lintel carved in relief with a lion, and a large square-headed window dating from the 16th–17th century with four trefoil-headed lights. In the south wall of the chancel are a single lancet and a twin lancet window, between which is a blocked doorway. The east window is round-headed. Above the window is a gable containing red and yellow brick and rendering.

=== Interior ===
The tower arch is pointed and is partly obscured by the west gallery. The gallery is carried on a pair of wooden columns. On the south wall of the nave is a blocked round-headed doorway, and on the north wall is the blocked arcade. The chancel arch is pointed, and in the chancel is a blocked south door. The chancel rails are in two bays with a central opening; they were made from a former 15th-century oak rood screen. The wooden octagonal pulpit dates from the late 18th or the early 19th century, and contains painted panels. In the tower is a carved stone infant's coffin. The lead Romanesque font that was formerly in the church has been moved to the North Lincolnshire Museum in Scunthorpe. There is a ring of three bells, but these are no longer ringable. The oldest bell was cast in 1578 by Henry I Oldfield, and the other two were made in about 1599 by John Woolley.

== External features ==
The churchyard contains war graves of three Royal Engineers soldiers of the First World War.

== See also ==
- List of churches preserved by the Churches Conservation Trust in the East of England
