= 1898 in rail transport =

This article lists events related to rail transport that occurred in 1898.

== Events ==
=== March ===
- March 16 – Original Finnish Railway Museum opens in Helsinki.

=== April ===
- April 1 – The Aberlady, Gullane and North Berwick Railway opens between Aberlady Junction and Gullane, Scotland.
- April 20 – Electrification of the South Side Elevated Railway in Chicago is completed ending all steam locomotive operations on the route. Multiple-unit (M.U.) train control is also introduced by railroad engineer Frank J. Sprague.

=== May ===
- May – E. H. Harriman becomes chairman of the executive committee for the Union Pacific Railroad.
- May 11 – The Lynton and Barnstaple Railway in England opens.
- May 16 – Passenger service is inaugurated on the Lynton and Barnstaple Railway.

=== June ===
- June 12 – Regular revenue service begins on the Detroit, Ypsilanti and Ann Arbor Railway in Michigan.

=== July ===
- July 3 – Rail transport in Sudan: Desert railway from Wadi Halfa completed to Atbara by British military engineers on 1,067 mm (3 ft 6 in) gauge.
- July 11 – Opening of the London and South Western Railway’s Waterloo & City line, the second deep-level electrified "tube" railway in London.
- July 21 – First section of White Pass and Yukon Route opens out of Skagway, Alaska, first railroad in the territory.
- July 23 – Brooks Locomotive Works completes its 3,000th new steam locomotive.
- July 30 – The Société des Chemins de fer vicinaux du Mayumbe (CVM) is created to build and operate a network of 2 ft (610 mm) gauge railways in the province of Lower Congo, in the Congo Free State, with a planned extension to the Republic of the Congo.

=== September ===
- September 2 – The Wellingborough rail accident in England kills 7 people.

=== October ===
- October 17 – The Wrawby Junction rail crash in England kills 9 people.

=== Unknown date ===
- Sunset magazine is founded as a promotional tool of the Southern Pacific Railroad.
- The Loup Creek & Deepwater railway is officially renamed Deepwater Railway

== Deaths ==
- March 6 – Hugh J. Jewett, president of the Erie Railroad 1874–1884 (b. 1817).
- October 12 – John M. Forbes, president of the Michigan Central Railroad and the Chicago, Burlington and Quincy Railroad (b. 1813).
- November 20 – Sir John Fowler, British civil engineer (b. 1817).
- December 15 – Calvin S. Brice, president of Lake Erie and Western Railroad, builder of Nickel Plate Road (b. 1845).
