= Blyton (disambiguation) =

Blyton may refer to:

== As a place ==
- Blyton, a village and civil parish in Lincolnshire, England
- Blyton, Illinois, an unincorporated community in Illinois, United States

== As a surname ==
- Billy Blyton, Baron Blyton (1899–1977), a British Labour Party politician
- Carey Blyton (1932–2002), a British composer and writer
- Enid Blyton (1897–1968), a British children's author
- Katherine Dow Blyton (born 1964), an English actress

== Other ==
- RAF Blyton, an airfield in Lincolnshire, England
