= Barnetby le Wold =

Small rural village and civil parish in North Lincolnshire, England

Coordinates: 53.5779°N 0.4071°W

Barnetby Le Wold: Barnetby
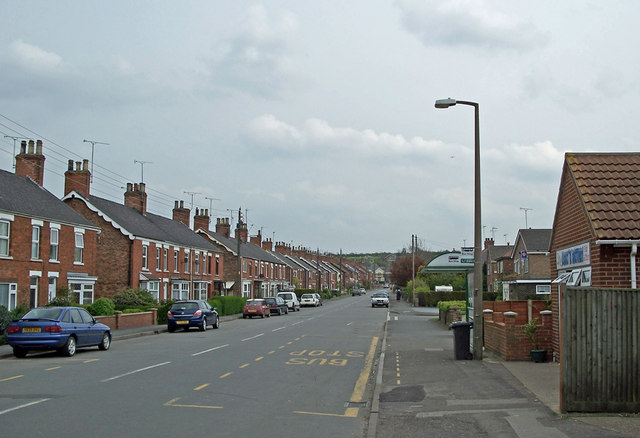
- Victoria Road, Barnetby

- Location within Lincolnshire
- Population: 1,741 (Including Searby, Lincolnshire. 2011 census)
- OS grid reference: TA054102
  - London: 145 mi (233 km) S
- Unitary authority: North Lincolnshire
- Ceremonial county: Lincolnshire
- Region: Yorkshire and the Humber
- Country: England
- Sovereign state: United Kingdom
- Post town: BARNETBY
- Postcode district: DN38
- Dialling code: 01652
- Police: Humberside
- Fire: Humberside
- Ambulance: East Midlands
- UK Parliament: Brigg and Immingham

Barnetby le Wold is a village and civil parish in North Lincolnshire, Lincolnshire, England, located between Brigg and Immingham. The village is also near Barton-upon-Humber. Barnetby railway station serves the village and Humberside Airport.

== History ==
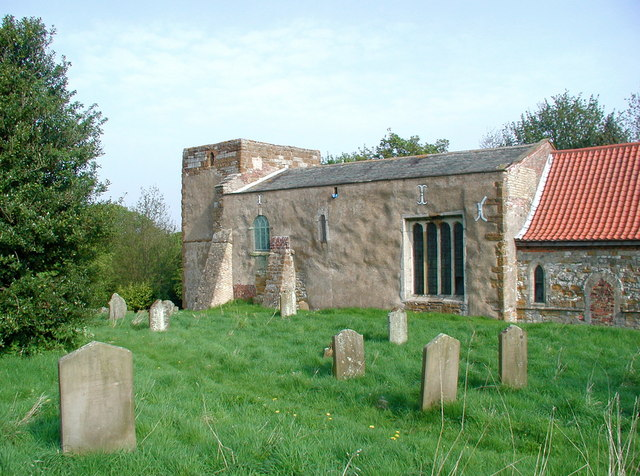
St Mary's Church with its squat tower

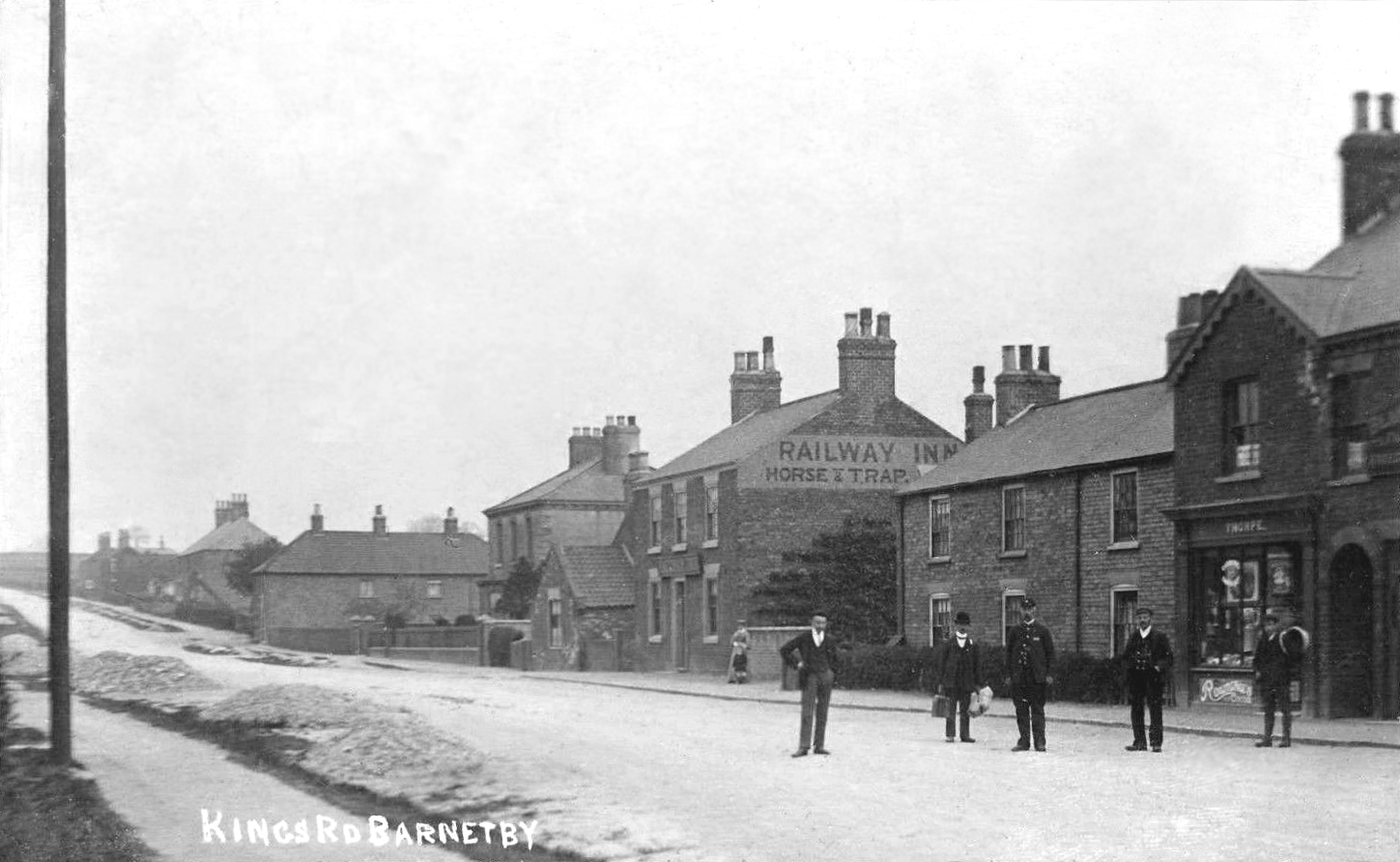
Historic photograph of Kings Road (circa. 1912)

Evidence of early settlement is indicated by the finding of a cast copper brooch in the village, which was based on a late Roman age coin. The village was listed in the Domesday Book of 1086, where it is called "Bernodebi", which is derived from the Scandinavian name "Beornnoth", a potential Dane who settled and gave his name to the area. As such, the village was historically part of the Danelaw area of England but by 1086 was recorded as in the lordship of William de Percy. The "le Wold" denotes that the village is part of the greater Lincolnshire Wolds geographic area. The historical animal husbandry method of tethering cattle was carried out in the village, and there is a place called teatherings refecting this.

In 1821, Barnetby le Wold parish was recorded to contain 45 houses and 316 inhabitants.

== Governance ==
The village is part of the North Lincolnshire local authority area. There is a local parish council for the village.

=== Westminster ===
The area was formerly represented in Westminster by the Brigg and Goole constituency but following a boundary review in 2023, the seat was abolished in 2024. The village is now represented by the Brigg and Immingham constituency.

== Demography ==
The population of the parish in the 2001 census was 1,593. This increased by 148 to 1,741 in the 2011 census.

== Landmarks ==
The redundant Church of St Mary on Church Hill is originally of Saxon origin, but the recent building contains more Norman architecture. The font inside the church is said to date from the times of King Stephen. On the northern side of the church, a crude carving of a cat may be seen. St Mary's Church originally possessed a Norman lead font, which was the only one in Lincolnshire – being only 30 such examples in England. The font was moved to the newer church of St Barnabas and is now in the North Lincolnshire Museum, Scunthorpe.

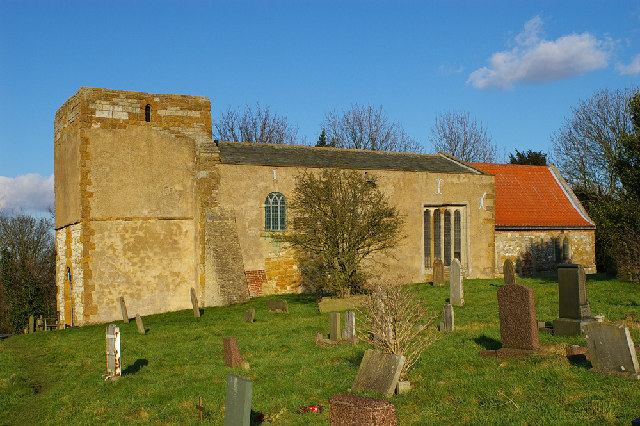
Church of St Mary

Despite being called "new", St Barnabas Church was completed in 1927, and is of brick construction. For many years the church hall was of wooden construction, but this was demolished and a modern brick hall built on the site. The church hall was the main venue for many village functions until a purpose-built village hall was built during the 1980s alongside the playing fields. The other religious building in Barnetby is the Methodist Chapel and Hall on West Street(now closed).

The Viking Way from the Humber Estuary to Oakham, in Rutland passes through the village. The route is posted with a Viking symbol.

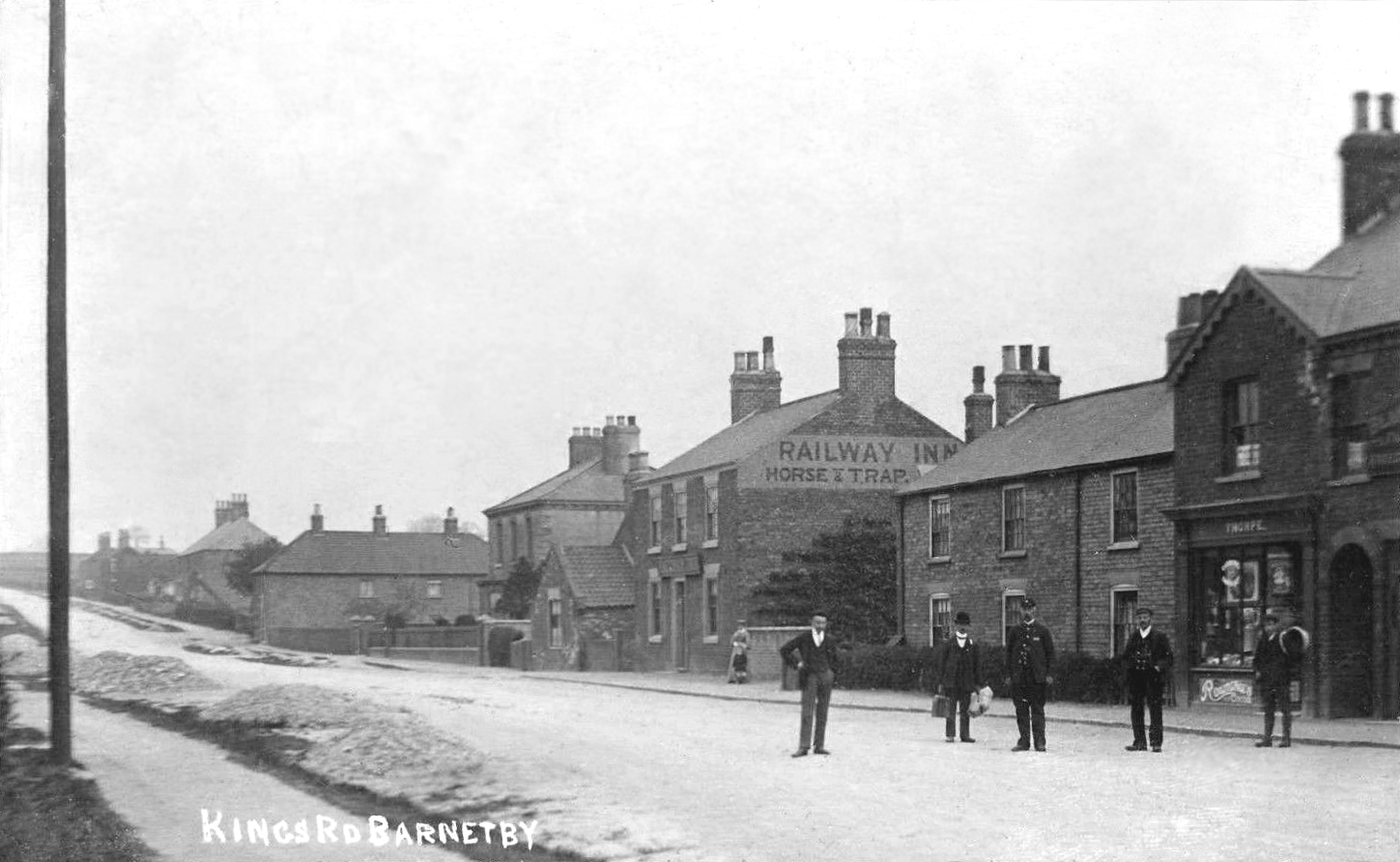
The Railway Inn on Kings Road before 1912

Just outside the village and alongside the A18 Brigg road is a set of ancient gallows. These were erected in the 17th century on the orders of King James I as a deterrent to two local feuding families – the Ros's from Melton Ross and the Tyrwhits from Kettleby. This feud had lasted over 300 years, and James I ordered that any subsequent death as a result of this long-standing feud would be treated as murder and the offender would be hanged from the gallows. The adjacent woods are locally known as Gallows Wood.

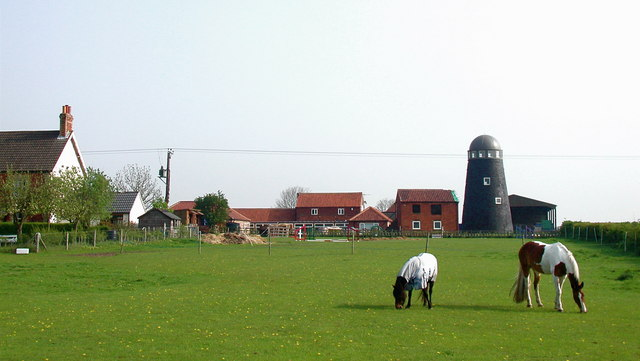
Countryside views from Barnetby Le Wold. The converted Top Mill is on the right.

The village has one public house which was formerly known as the 'Station Hotel' but after redevelopment of the hotel to include accommodation and a music studio resulted in the pub being renamed the 'Whistle & Flute'. A second pub in the village was the 'Railway Inn', however this was closed by 2018, has now been demolished, and the site used for new housing. The village also has two convenience stores, a Post Office (now relocated to be part of one of the convenience stores), three establishments offering a variety of takeaway food and two other bed & breakfast/hotels.

== Transport ==
=== Railway ===
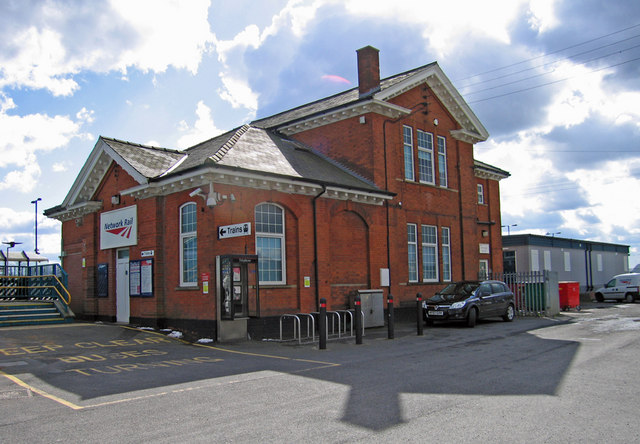
Railway house at Barnetby railway station

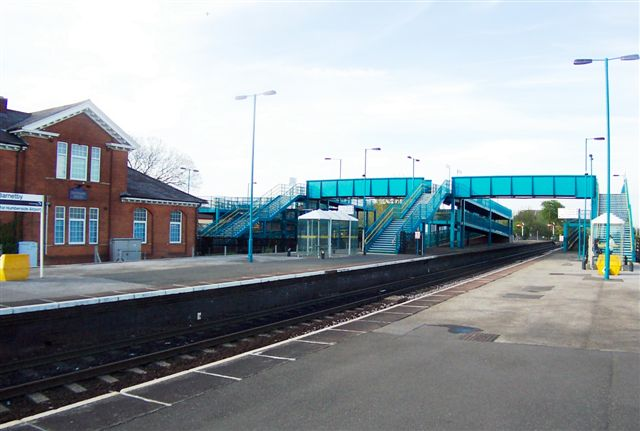
Barnetby railway station platform

The village is a direct result of the coming of the railway in 1848. Originally part of the Trent, Axholme & Grimsby Railway, the station later passed into the hands of the Manchester, Sheffield & Lincolnshire Railway, thereafter becoming part of the Great Central Railway. In the 1923 grouping of railway companies the Great Central became the London & North Eastern Railway and finally in 1948 becoming British Railways before becoming Railtrack and ultimately the present-day Network Rail.

Although Barnetby had a small amount of rail freight traffic originating from it, most of the trains were passing through on the way to Immingham or Grimsby. In the other direction, freight trains such as the "Banbury fish" passed through. However, most of Barnetby's rail traffic was involved with the steel works at Scunthorpe, which was taken over by Corus. Although Lincolnshire has a reputation for being flat, this part of the county has several steep inclines and many freights required extra locomotives in order to cope with the gradients. For this purpose, a locomotive depot was built at nearby Wrawby junction – together with a turntable. Today, only the remains of the turntable pit can be found, which can just be seen in the undergrowth between the Brigg and Lincoln branch lines.

Although Barnetby's rail network has decreased compared to the 20th century, 25 per cent of Britain's bulk rail freight traffic passes through the village. The biggest volume is the imported coal to feed power stations and the nearby Corus steelworks at Scunthorpe. Iron Ore, petroleum products and steel also pass through in large quantities. Additionally, DB Cargo operated biomass trains frequently pass through Barnetby, serving imported wood chips and pellets for energy production at Drax Power Station.

Services from the station include an hourly TransPennine Express service to Manchester Airport calling at Scunthorpe, Doncaster, Sheffield and Manchester Piccadilly and originating from Cleethorpes.

Further services include an East Midlands Railway service from Grimsby to Lincoln and Newark, also Northern Trains services to Sheffield via Brigg and Retford which operate on Saturdays.

=== Bus service ===
There are several bus services which operate through the village and are run by a number of operators. Bus services are often dictated by various factors such as school and college periods and the market days in the nearby town Brigg. Stagecoach Lincolnshire provides one weekday service each way as diversions of the Grimsby/Hull Humber Flyer.

Hornsby Travel provides the more frequent service from Mondays to Fridays which is known as the 'Wolds Villager'. This service operates hourly between 9 am and 4 pm (approx.) and travels between Brigg and Kirmington calling at Humberside Airport and Wrawby. Furthermore, Hornsby provide a service between Ulceby and Scunthorpe calls at the village on Saturdays.

The service was originally introduced by the local Unitary Authority of North Lincolnshire Council who still support and subsidise this service. There are no bus services on Sundays.

=== Airport ===
Humberside Airport is approximately 4 miles away from the village and operates daily services to Amsterdam and Aberdeen among various holiday destinations. The Airport also has an oil platform helicopter ferry operator which is based at the Airport along with the Humberside Police force helicopter – 'Oscar 99'.

=== Road ===
The village has major links to other cities such as Kingston upon Hull (via the A15 and A63), Grimsby (via the A180), Doncaster (via the M180), Sheffield (via the M180 and M1), Leeds (via the M180 and M62) and Manchester (via the M180 and M62). All of these are accessed via 'Barnetby top' which is a large roundabout junction at the top of the village.

Work in 2016 created a new small roundabout junction at the top of the village (from Kings Road) with links to the A18 from the direction of Brigg and Melton Ross.

== Education ==
The village's primary school is St Barnabas Primary School. The most recent Ofsted rating was in July 2013 where the school was rated overall as Good but with Outstanding features. This is a downgrading from their previous rating of overall Outstanding in 2007

Many of the students at the school progress to the local secondary schools. These schools include Vale Academy, Sir John Nelethorpe, Caistor Yarborough Academy and Caistor Grammar.
