= Darius Perkins =

Australian actor (1964–2019)

- Darius Perkins as the original Scott Robinson in Neighbours (TV series) in 1985.
- Born: Darius Anton Perkins; 28 October 1964
- Died: 2 January 2019 (aged 54)
- Occupation: Actor
- Years active: 1980–2014

Darius Anton Perkins (28 October 1964 – 2 January 2019) was an Australian actor. He was the original actor in the role of teenager Scott Robinson in the soap opera Neighbours in 1985 before the role was taken over by Jason Donovan the following year.

Perkins also played Charlie in All the Green Year, Gary Samuels in Home and Away, and Ben in All the Rivers Run for which he won a Logie Award. After a lengthy time away from the screen, in 2013 Perkins returned to Neighbours as guest character Marty Kranic. Perkins also worked in the art department for Crashburn and Bollywood film Salaam Namaste, which was made in Australia.

== Career ==
Perkins had no formal acting training. While in Year Six at primary school, he appeared in a production of The Happy Prince. His drama teacher was actress Val Lehman. His first television role was "naughty schoolboy" Jim Bullock in an episode of Lawson's Mates in 1980. Perkins attended Swinburne Senior Secondary College and told Jill Morris of The Age that he wanted to be both an actor and artist. He played Charlie Reeves in the six-part period drama All the Green Year, which is based on the novel by Don Charlwood. The series was shot on the Mornington Peninsula and Perkins admitted that the hardest part of filming was learning to ride a camel. Perkins later worked with his All the Green Year co-star Greg Stroud on an episode of Cop Shop. He also appeared in 28 episodes of The Sullivans. Perkins also had guest roles in Cop Shop, Prisoner, A Country Practice, and Carson's Law.

Perkins played Ben in the HBO miniseries All the Rivers Run in 1983, which earned him the Logie Award for Best Juvenile Performance. In 1984, he played Stephen Caine in the television film Matthew and Son, alongside Paul Cronin as Stephen's father Matthew. The film was based on the life of Victoria police surgeon Dr John Birrell. When Matthew and Son was not picked up for a series, Perkins joined new Seven Network soap opera Neighbours as Scott Robinson. His father Robbie Perkins was a freelance set designer, who helped create the original Neighbours sets. His brother Martin became a dresser on the serial. Perkins only appeared as Scott for the show's first year. When the series moved to Network Ten at the start of 1986, Perkins was sacked from the role due to alleged problems with his behaviour on the set, including lateness. He would later state, however, that his contract simply expired and he was not under obligation with Network Ten, after the series had moved from Network Seven. Jason Donovan took over the role and the character remained in the show until 1989.

After leaving Neighbours, Perkins guested in a 1987 episode of The Flying Doctors as Glen Reid, a young man who takes a romantic interest in Dr. Chris Randall (Liz Burch). The following year, he took on the recurring role of Gary Samuels in Home and Away. Perkins was contracted for seven weeks and he felt challenged by the role, describing his character as a "psychotic sociopath". In 1991, Perkins appeared in the two-part miniseries Ratbag Hero. In 1994, he appeared once again in A Country Practice as Graham Irving, Jess Morrison's (Jane Hall) former boyfriend. Perkins also worked behind the scenes, most notably in the art departments for the TV series Crashburn and Australian film Storm Warning. He served as the art director for Bollywood film Salaam Namaste. On 10 July 2013, it was announced that Perkins would be returning to Neighbours in the guest role playing Paul Robinson's shady business associate Marty Kranic.

== Personal life ==
In 1992, Perkins was arrested after being involved in a collision with his former partner's car. He was convicted for drink-driving after he was found to have a blood alcohol level of .110. At the hearing in the Prahran Magistrates' Court, Perkins had his license cancelled and he was disqualified from driving for 11 months. He was later removed from a television advertisement for the Transport Accident Commission when they learned of the conviction.

In addition to his acting career, Perkins was also a singer with the Melbourne rock 'n' roll band Genius.

Perkins died from cancer on 2 January 2019, aged 54. Tributes came from his former Neighbours co-star David Clencie (Danny Ramsay) who said, "I am so sad, really devastated to lose my mate. We had this incredible bond. We were mates to the very end." Jason Donovan later stated, "Never met Darius but always had great respect both personally and professionally." Stefan Dennis who played Perkins' former on-screen brother, and Neighbours executive producer Jason Herbison also paid tribute to him.

== Filmography ==
Year	Title	Role	Notes
1980	Lawson's Mates	Jim Bullock	Episode: "Tommy"
1980	All the Green Year	Charlie Reeves	Main cast
	The Sullivans		
	Cop Shop		Guest roles
1983	Prisoner	Trevor Collins	Recurring role
	Carson's Law		
1983	All the Rivers Run	Ben	TV miniseries
1984	A Country Practice	Hedley Skinner	Episodes: "Repairing the Damage: Part 1 & 2"
1984	Matthew and Son	Stephen Caine	Television film
1985	Neighbours	Scott Robinson	Main cast
1987	The Flying Doctors	Glen Reid	Episode: "Bachelors and Spinsters"
1988	Home and Away	Gary Samuels	Recurring role
1991	Ratbag Hero	Dave	TV miniseries
1994	A Country Practice	Graham Irving	Episode: "A Taste of Honey"
2013–2014	Neighbours	Marty Kranic	Recurring role
