= Great British Car Journey =

- Location within Derbyshire and the United Kingdom
- Established: 22 May 2021; 5 years ago
- Location: Ambergate, Derbyshire, England
- Coordinates: 53.0671°N 1.4918°W
- Type: Automotive museum
- Collections: Vehicles
- Founder: Richard Usher
- Website: www.greatbritishcarjourney.com

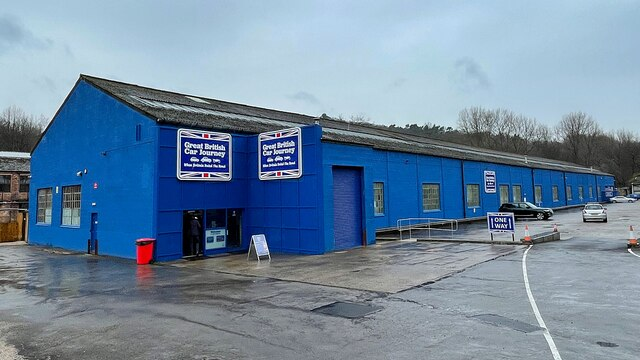
The Great British Car Journey

The Great British Car Journey is a car museum in Ambergate, Derbyshire, England. It opened on 22 May 2021. The museum's exhibits consist of over 130 cars that illustrate the history of British car design and production between 1922 and the present day.

== Collections ==
Vehicles on display include a Morris Minor Million, Humber Hawk, Austin Allegro, Rover Metro, Mini Clubman, Triumph Toledo, Sinclair C5, DMC DeLorean, Ford Fiesta, Jensen Interceptor, Rover P6, Jaguar XJS and Lotus Esprit. Visitors to the museum are taken on an "interactive journey" and are able to learn about the history of the cars by scanning them with a device. The cars are arranged in groups by decade of production, surrounded by banners and artwork displaying period adverts and graphics. Visitors are able to get close to the cars, so they can "smell the old car smell, marvel at the interiors and jog memories".

In addition to the display vehicles are 32 cars—including a Ford Capri, Austin Seven and Rolls-Royce Silver Spirit—that visitors are able to drive around the site, accompanied by an instructor. Visitors are also able to view maintenance work being undertaken on the exhibits.

The museum is the idea of Richard Usher, former owner of Blyton Park racing circuit and Auto Windscreens. The idea took shape after Usher was asked if he wanted to buy a low-mileage, mint condition, 1989 Austin Maestro; Usher initially thought 'no', but later reflected on how rare such cars—the everyday cars that a few years ago sold in their millions— had become. Acquiring the cars and establishing the museum took about four years; one of the hardest cars to source was a Vauxhall Chevette, as few had survived out of the half a million that were made and the museum wanted one in a basic trim specification; the display car was eventually bought from Vauxhall. The museum had been scheduled to open in April 2020, but its opening date was delayed a year due to health problems of two of its founders, unforeseen extra costs, flooding at the site, and the COVID-19 pandemic.

The museum occupies a 4-acre site of a former wire works, which shut down in 1996 after 120 years of production. The wire works had employed 500 people in its heyday, and during World War II made the telegraph cables that were routed under the English Channel.
