= Matthew and Son (film) =

- Based on: short story by Bert Deling; Michael Aitkens
- Written by: Christine Schofield; Marcus Cole
- Directed by: Gary Conway
- Starring: Paul Cronin; Darius Perkins; Paula Duncan
- Country of origin: Australia
- Original language: English

Production
- Producer: Damien Parer
- Running time: 75 mins
- Production company: Television House Films
- Budget: $800,000

Original release
- Network: Channel Ten
- Release: 5 August 1984

Matthew and Son is a 1984 Australian television film about a single parent who is a police surgeon. It was filmed May to June 1984 and is a pilot for a TV series that never eventuated.

== Cast ==
- Peter Kowitz as Jerry Ashton
- Paul Cronin as Matthew Caine
- Darius Perkins as Stephen Caine
- Paula Duncan as Barbara Dean
- Nicole Kidman as Bridgette Elliot
- Edward Hepple as Bert Macrostie
- Alex Menglet as Gebhard
- Ben Mendelsohn in a cameo role

== Production ==
The film was one of several projects Paul Cronin made when at Channel Ten, and was done for Johnny Young's company. Cronin:

It was based on the life of Dr John Birrell, the police surgeon, who was instrumental in the .05 and seatbelt legislation. A fascinating man – I met him, and he was a great character to play. Ten Brisbane, Ten Melbourne and Ten Adelaide committed to a series – they had a 7:30 timeslot allocated for it and all – and the only fly in the ointment was Ten Sydney. They would not commit. The telemovie rated well when it did go to air. It was a very, very well constructed show, but Johnny's company collapsed after that, and I left channel Ten.

The cast includes Cronin as Matthew Caine, Paula Duncan as social worker Barbara Dean, Darius Perkins as Matthew's son Stephen, and Nicole Kidman as Stephen's friend Bridgette Elliot.
