= Kirton Lindsey railway station =

Railway station in Kirton in Lindsey, England

Kirton Lindsey
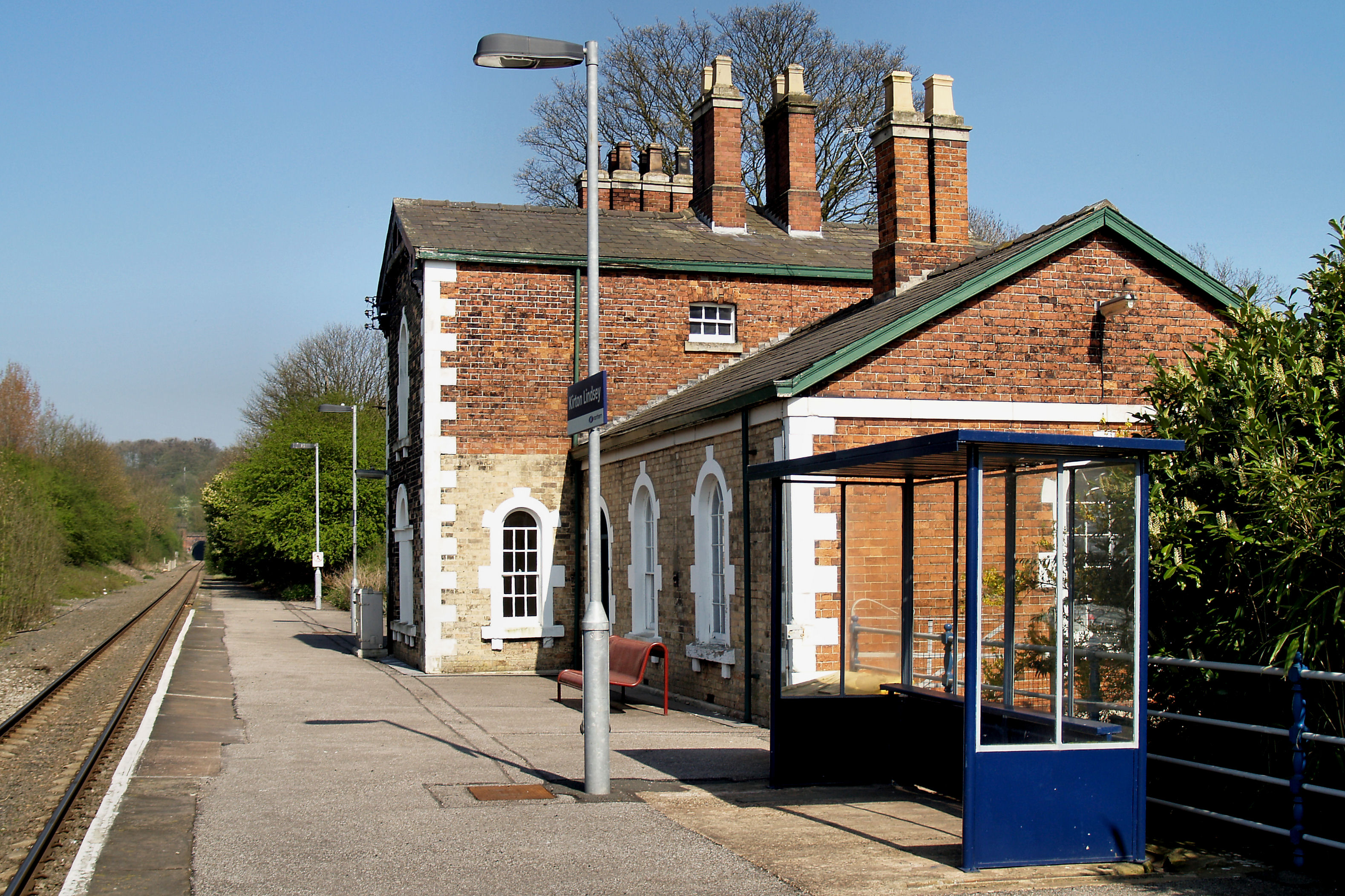
- Kirton Lindsey station platform looking NE towards Kirton Tunnel and Brigg

General information
- Location: Kirton in Lindsey, North Lincolnshire; England
- Coordinates: 53.485°N 0.594°W
- Grid reference: SK933996
- Manager: Northern Trains
- Platforms: 1

Other information
- Station code: KTL
- Classification: DfT category F2

History
- Opened: 1849

Passengers
- 2021/22: ▲68
- 2022/23: ▲94
- 2023/24: ▲294
- 2024/25: ▲740
- 2025/26: ▼512
Location
Notes
- Passenger statistics from the Office of Rail and Road

Kirton Lindsey railway station serves the town of Kirton in Lindsey in North Lincolnshire, Lincolnshire, England. The station was opened in 1849 on the former main line of the Great Grimsby and Sheffield Junction Railway which became part of the Manchester, Sheffield and Lincolnshire Railway.

The station was built with two flanking platforms with the main station building on the Sheffield-bound side at the top of a long approach road. The Grimsby-bound platform had a simple waiting shelter and the platforms were linked by a latticed footbridge. The footbridge and Grimsby bound platform have since been removed and the route reduced to a single track at this point.

== Service ==
All services at Kirton Lindsey are operated by Northern Trains.

As of 21 May 2023, this station is served by only two trains per day on weekdays only, one to Sheffield and one to Cleethorpes. There is no weekend service.

Between October 1993 and May 2023, the station was served by 3 trains in each direction between Sheffield and Cleethorpes on Saturdays only, with no services running on weekdays or Sundays.

Preceding station	National Rail	Following station
Gainsborough Central	Northern Trains Brigg Branch Line Limited service	Brigg
	Historical railways	
Northorpe Line open, station closed	Great Central Railway Great Grimsby and Sheffield Junction Railway	Scawby Line open, station closed
