= Scawby railway station =

Former railway station in Lincolnshire, England

Scawby & Hibaldstow
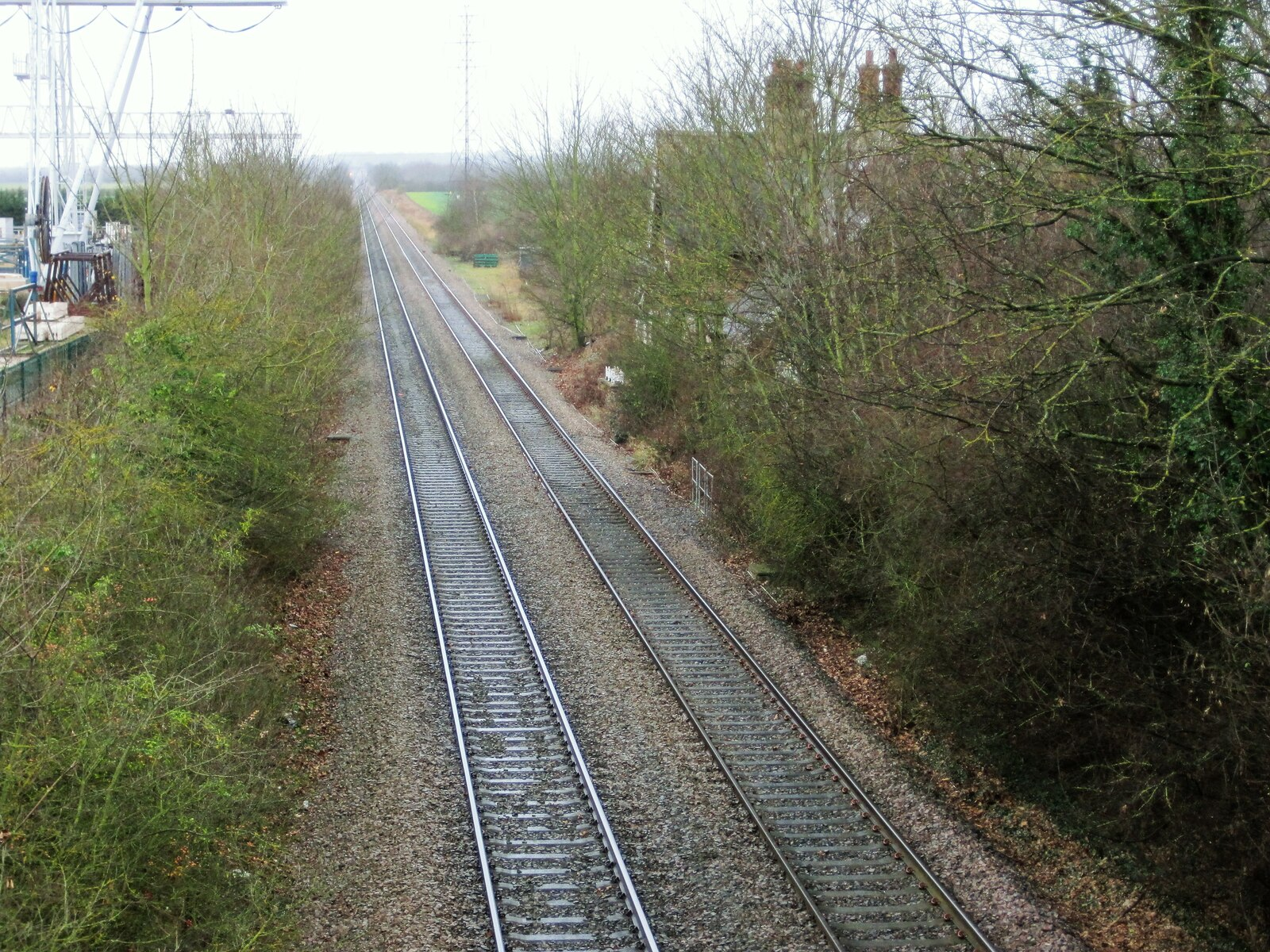
- Station site in 2020.

General information
- Location: Scawby, Lincolnshire; England
- Coordinates: 53.5218°N 0.5341°W
- Platforms: 2

Other information
- Status: Disused

History
- Original company: Great Grimsby and Sheffield Junction Railway
- Pre-grouping: Great Central Railway
- Post-grouping: LNER

Key dates
- 2 April 1849: Opened
- 5 February 1968: Closed
Location

Scawby railway station, also known as Scawby and Hibaldstow railway station, was a station in Scawby, Lincolnshire. It was located on the line between Gainsborough and Grimsby. The station opened in 1849 and closed in 1968 but the line still remains open but calling at fewer stations than it once did.

Former Services

| Preceding station | Historical railways | Following station |
|---|---|---|
| Kirton Lindsey; Line and station open | Great Central Railway; Great Grimsby and Sheffield Junction Railway | Brigg; Line and station open |
