= Wrawby Junction =

Coordinates: 53°34′12″N 0°25′14″W

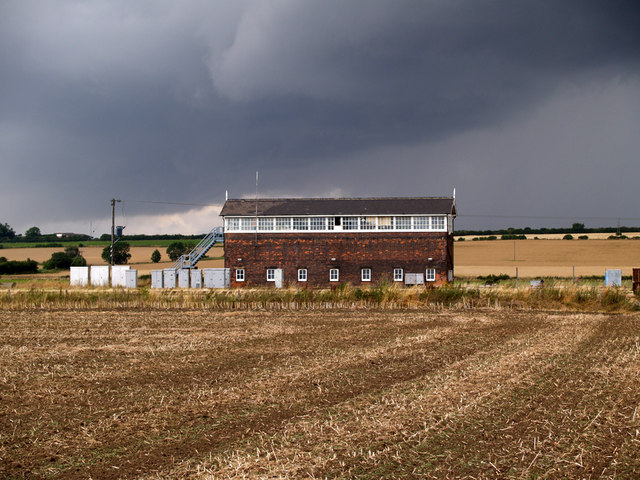
Wrawby Junction signalbox

Wrawby Junction is a busy railway junction located a short distance west of Barnetby, North Lincolnshire, England and controls the confluence of the Network Rail routes from Lincoln, Retford and Scunthorpe towards Immingham and Cleethorpes. The junction was controlled by a large signal box of part-brick, part-wooden, construction and is now controlled from York Rail Operating Centre (ROC).

== History ==
Although the railway has served the area since 1848, the present construction is of late-Great Central Railway design. Apart from the part-brick construction, Wrawby Junction is of similar design to its companion signal boxes at Barnetby East and Barnetby West. All signal boxes were built about 1916 when the section of route between Wrawby and Brocklesby was quadrupled to cope with the growing amount of freight traffic heading for the docks at Immingham and Grimsby. As well as controlling this busy complex of routes, Wrawby Junction was also responsible for controlling the entrance to the once-busy railway sidings at Barnetby, and the locomotive depot. When built, the lever frame consisted of 132 levers, whilst later, 5 more levers were added at the left hand end (A to E inclusive). Wrawby Junction was the largest manual signal box in the world to be worked by a lone signaller. Most other large signal boxes require two or more signallers.

Wrawby Junction signal box is a grade II listed building, and closed on Christmas Eve 2015, control of the area being transferred to York Rail Operating Centre.

== Accidents ==
Wrawby Junction has been the site of two fatal accidents :

- On 17 October 1898, 8 people were killed when a passenger train collided with a derailed goods train.
- On 9 December 1983, one passenger was killed when a goods train collided with a passenger train.

== Wrawby Junction today ==
Modern-day Wrawby Junction is still quite a complex location, although changing traffic patterns have resulted in significant rationalisation of the layout. Once noted for its impressive semaphore signal arrays, the whole area is now controlled by colour-light signals. The locomotive depot no longer exists, although the eagle-eyed observer will still notice the old turntable pit between the Lincoln and Retford routes. The sidings see little use, trains may be either recessed or run-round in the Down Reception lines. Additionally, Colas Rail locomotives can be found stabled in what is left of the goods yard sidings.

Wrawby Junction signal box closed in December 2015 as part of the re-signalling of the line between Scunthorpe and Cleethorpes.
