= Northorpe railway station =

Former railway station in Northorpe, Lincolnshire, England

Coordinates: 53.4581°N 0.6382°W

Former station

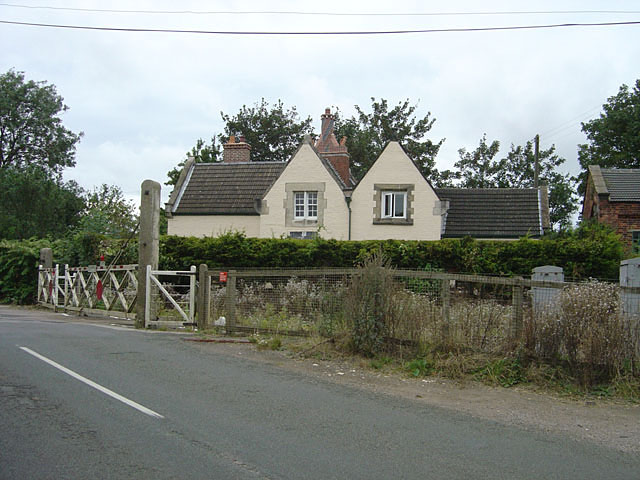
Former station building, now a house

Northorpe railway station was a railway station in Northorpe, Lincolnshire, England. It opened on 2 April 1849 and closed for passengers on 4 July 1955 and freight on 2 March 1964. Originally named Northorpe, it became Northorpe (Lincs) at some point after January 1948. Although the station is now closed, the signal box here remains in use to supervise a level crossing and passing loop on the single track section of the route between Gainsborough Central and Kirton Lindsey.

Preceding station	Disused railways	Following station
Blyton	Great Central Railway	Kirton Lindsey
