= All the Green Year =

1980 Australian television series

- Genre: Coming of Age
- Based on: All the Green Year by Don Charlwood
- Written by: Cliff Green
- Directed by: Douglas Sharp
- Starring: Carl Hansen; Alan Hopgood
- Narrated by: Alwyn Kurts
- Country of origin: Australia
- Original language: English
- No. of episodes: 6

Production
- Producer: Oscar Whitbread
- Running time: 30 mins
- Production company: ABC

Original release
- Network: ABC
- Release: 20 October – 24 November 1980

All the Green Year is a six-part Australian television series based on a novel about three boys growing up near Melbourne on the eve of the Great Depression, that aired on the ABC in 1980.

It is based on the book of the same name by Don Charlwood, first published in 1965. The book sold over 100,000 copies and has come to be regarded as an Australian classic.

== Cast ==
- Greg Stroud as Johnno
- Darius Perkins as Charlie Reeves
- Jamie Adamson
- Sally Cooper
- Carl Hansen
- Monica Maughan as Mrs Reeves
- Alan Hopgood as Mr Reeves
- Alwyn Kurts as Older Charlie Reeves
- Larry Held
- Tracey Kelly as Eileen
- Pepe Trevor as Kitty

== Production ==
The novel was published in 1965 and was acclaimed. It was set as a text for high school students studying English Literature in the 1960s.

In 1977 it was announced the ABC would make a TV series based on the book. Filming did not take place until mid 1980.

Although most of the series was set in the Melbourne suburb of Frankston, it was shot in Flinders.
