= Blyton railway station =

Former railway station in Lincolnshire, England

Blyton
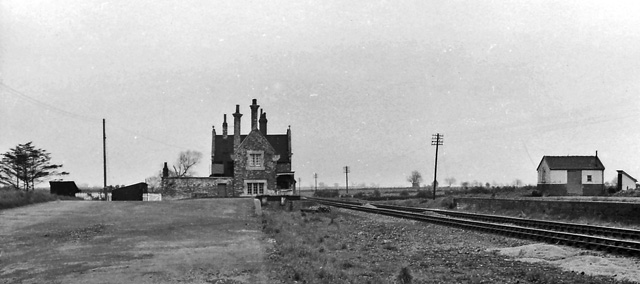
- The station in 1967

General information
- Location: Blyton, West Lindsey; England
- Coordinates: 53.4396°N 0.7020°W
- Grid reference: SK863943
- Platforms: 2

Other information
- Status: Disused

History
- Original company: Manchester, Sheffield and Lincolnshire Railway
- Pre-grouping: Great Central Railway
- Post-grouping: London and North Eastern Railway

Key dates
- 2 April 1849: Opened
- 2 February 1959: Closed
Location

Blyton railway station is a former railway station in Blyton, Lincolnshire. It was on the (still open) line between Gainsborough and Grimsby.

Preceding station	Historical railways	Following station
Gainsborough Central; Line and station open	Great Central Railway	Northorpe; Line open, station closed
