= Blyton Windmill =

Windmill in Blyton, Lincolnshire, England

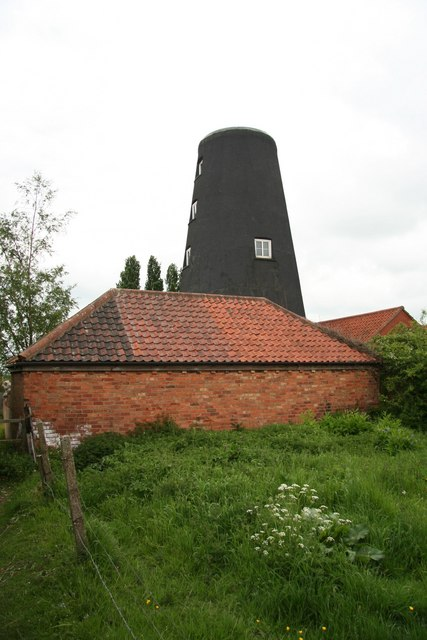
- Blyton Mill, May 2008
- Interactive map of Blyton Windmill

Origin
- Mill name: Blyton Mill
- Mill location: Blyton, Lincolnshire, United Kingdom
- Grid reference: SK 8519 9474
- Coordinates: 53°24′26″N 0°43′07″W
- Year built: 1825

Information
- Purpose: Corn mill
- Type: Tower mill
- Storeys: Five storeys
- No. of sails: Four
- Type of sails: Patent sails
- Auxiliary power: Engine
- No. of pairs of millstones: Three pairs

Blyton Windmill is a Grade II listed tower mill in Blyton, Lincolnshire, United Kingdom. A corn mill built in 1825, it worked by wind until 1910, then by engine until the late 1960s. The tower survives, converted to residential accommodation.

== History ==
Blyton Windmill was built in 1825. It worked by wind until 1910, then by engine until the late 1960s. The mill was converted to residential accommodation in 1974. It was listed Grade II on 23 May 1985.

== Description ==
Blyton Windmill is a five storey tower mill with an ogee cap. It had four Patent sails, carried on a cast iron windshaft and mounted on a cross. The mill drove three pairs of millstones and a roller mill.
