= Wrawby Junction rail crash =

1983 train crash in England

Details
- Date: 9 December 1983; 18:18
- Location: Wrawby Junction
- Coordinates: 53.5701°N 0.4197°W
- Country: England
- Line: Sheffield-Lincoln line
- Cause: Signalling error

Statistics
- Trains: 2
- Passengers: 11
- Deaths: 1
- Injured: 3

The Wrawby Junction rail crash was a train crash which occurred on 9 December 1983, at Wrawby Junction, near Barnetby station, North Lincolnshire, England.

It happened when a British Rail freight train collided at low speed with the side of a local passenger train. The first carriage of the passenger train was derailed and turned over onto its side, and one passenger was killed instantly. In the subsequent inquiry, the accident was deemed to have been caused by a signalman failing to secure a set of points that he had operated manually after an equipment failure.

== The accident ==
Approximately half an hour before the accident, the signalman in charge of Wrawby Junction signal box had changed a set of points (No.89) to send a freight train from the Up fast into the Down sidings, when he noticed a failure of the track circuit on the Down Slow, which prevented him from re-setting the points to their normal position (and also meant that most signals close to the signal box couldn't be cleared). He thus made the decision that he and another railwayman would walk to the points and move them to the normal position manually, which they did. Upon returning to the signal box, he noticed that the indicator for No.89 points appeared to be malfunctioning - normally it would show the points set to one position or the other, but the lights that showed which position the points were set to were both extinguished, which led the signalman to instruct the other railwayman to hand-signal the passenger train through, whilst he would do the same for the oil train.

Meanwhile, the 15:02 freight train from Drax power station to Lindsey Oil Refinery, composed of a Class 47 diesel locomotive (47299) and nine empty 100-ton oil wagons, had drawn up to the signal which was stuck at danger, and received a green hand-signal from the signal box. At this point, the driver of the freight train should have drawn up to the signal box to receive instructions, but on seeing the next signal clear, started to speed up.

At the same time, the 17:32 Cleethorpes to Sheffield local train, composed of a 2-carriage Class 114 diesel multiple unit, had left the nearby Barnetby station. The driver stopped at the Wrawby Junction home signal on the Down Fast, which was at danger, but saw the green hand-signal from the railwayman and started to pull forwards slowly to stop for instructions.

At some point between the railwaymen manually setting No.89 points, and the freight train reaching them, they had become reset to the reversed position towards the sidings. The freight train, upon reaching the points, thus took the incorrect route and collided with the side of the passenger train. Despite the low speed of the collision, the heavy locomotive caused serious damage to the front carriage of the passenger train, and one passenger, 19-year-old Rachel Taylor, was killed.

== The inquiry ==
The HM Railway Inspectorate inquiry found the accident to be due to the railwaymen failing to secure the points in the position in which they had set them. The report suggested that the signalman (though he had no recollection of doing so) had attempted to set the points lever in his cabin to the position matching that to which they had set them. This would have reset the circuit so that the points actually moved to the original position. The driver of the freight train was also held partially responsible, as he should have stopped his train at the signal box to receive further instructions.

== The freight locomotive ==
The incident was later given a stranger twist by the claim that the locomotive involved had been re-numbered in order to prevent a psychic's premonition that a locomotive numbered 47216 would be involved in a fatal accident. The freight train locomotive, 47299, had been renumbered from its previous designation of 47216 two years earlier, causing some confusion in rail enthusiast circles, as locomotives were only usually renumbered when some major mechanical alteration had been made to them, which was not the case. A British Rail source described the issue as "an amazing coincidence".
