= No Moon Tonight =

- First edition
- Author: Don Charlwood
- Language: English
- Genre: Autobiography
- Publisher: Angus & Robertson (Australia)
- Publication date: 1956
- Followed by: All The Green Year (1965)

No Moon Tonight is a World War II autobiographical book by Halifax/Lancaster/Wellington bomber navigator Don Charlwood. Born in Melbourne, Australia, in 1915 Charlwood joined the Royal Australian Air Force in 1940 and was trained in Canada via the Empire Air Training Scheme. The book covers his training and his experiences as part of the RAF's Bomber Command, and his crew's ordeal completing their tour of operations. The book's title is derived from a line in the song Tristesse that was often played in the mess before a mission.

In the autumn of 1942 he crewed up with a fellow Australian pilot Geoff Maddern from Western Australia and a British crew to fly a single combat mission to Bremen in a Wellington bomber from RAF Lichfield on 13 September 1942. Subsequently, posted to No 103 Squadron at RAF Elsham Wolds his crew converted to fly Lancaster bombers for the rest of their tour. Whilst at Elsham, Charlwood recounts the mounting losses being suffered by Bomber Command's air offensive against the strongly defended cities such as Essen, Düsseldorf and Duisburg in Germany and the thoughts of the crew as they approach the end of their 30 missions after seven months at Elsham.

Throughout the narrative, Charlwood details how his training group of navigators - The Twenty Men - are killed, injured or taken prisoner. Only a handful manage to survive the war.

After completing his tour of operations, Charlwood became an instructor with No 103 Squadron, and was then posted back to Australia. Whilst heading home via Canada, he became reacquainted with Nell East, a girl he had courted whilst training in Canada, and married her. He was demobbed from the RAAF on 31 July 1945 and subsequently worked for 30 years worked for the Department of Civil Aviation, initially as an Air Traffic Controller, and later as a trainer.

A companion book to No Moon Tonight appeared in 1991 and was entitled Journeys Into Night.

== Pseudonyms ==
Charlwood originally used pseudonyms to conceal the identity of several men in the original book. The true names were used in the paperback edition published in 1984.
