= 1813 in rail transport =

This article lists events related to rail transport that occurred in 1813.

== Events ==
- Passenger services (by horse-drawn coach) begin on the Kilmarnock & Troon Railway, the first such service in Scotland.

== Births ==
=== February births ===
- February 16 – Joseph R. Anderson, owner of American steam locomotive manufacturing company Tredegar Iron Works (d. 1892).
- February 23 – John M. Forbes, president of the Michigan Central Railroad and the Chicago, Burlington & Quincy Railroad (d. 1898).

=== May births ===
- May 14 – Charles Beyer, German-British steam locomotive manufacturer, co-founder of Beyer, Peacock & Company (d. 1876).

=== September births ===
- September 1 – Mark Hopkins, a member of The Big Four group of financiers in California.
- September 11 - John Chester Craven, Locomotive, Carriage and Wagon Superintendent at London, Brighton & South Coast Railway's Brighton Works 1847–1870, is born (d. 1887).

=== Unknown date births ===
- Wilson Eddy, American steam locomotive manufacturer (d. 1898).

== Deaths ==
1813, February – United Kingdom – A 13-year-old boy named Jeff Bruce was killed whilst running alongside the Middleton Railway tracks. The Leeds Mercury reported that this would "operate as a warning to others".
