= No. 103 Squadron RAF =

Defunct flying squadron of the Royal Air Force

- No. 103 Squadron badge
- Active: 1 Sep 1917 - 1 Oct 1919; 10 Aug 1936 - 26 Nov 1945; 30 Nov 1954 - 1 Aug 1956; 1 Aug 1959 - 31 Jul 1963; 1 Aug 1963 - 31 Jul 1975
- Country: United Kingdom
- Branch: Royal Air Force
- Nickname: "Swindon's 'own' Squadron" (unofficial)
- Mottos: Latin: Noli me tangere (Translation: "Touch me not" or more modern: "Don't touch me")
- Battle honours: Western Front, 1918*; Hindenburg Line*; France & Low Countries, 1939-40*; Invasion Ports, 1940*; Fortress Europe, 1940-44*; Biscay Ports, 1941-43; Berlin, 1941-44*; German Ports, 1941-45; Baltic, 1941-45; Ruhr, 1941-45*; France & Germany, 1944-45*; The honours marked with an asterisk(*) are those emblazoned on the squadron standard.

Insignia
- Squadron Badge heraldry: A swan, wings elevated and addorsed A swan was chosen because this bird is very strong on the wing and also well able to defend itself
- Squadron Codes: GV (Apr 1939 - Sep 1939); PM (Sep 1939 - Nov 1945)

No. 103 Squadron was a Royal Air Force bomber squadron during World War I, World War II and the Cold War, switching to helicopters in the late 1950s until it was disbanded for the last time in 1975.

== History ==
=== Formation in World War I ===
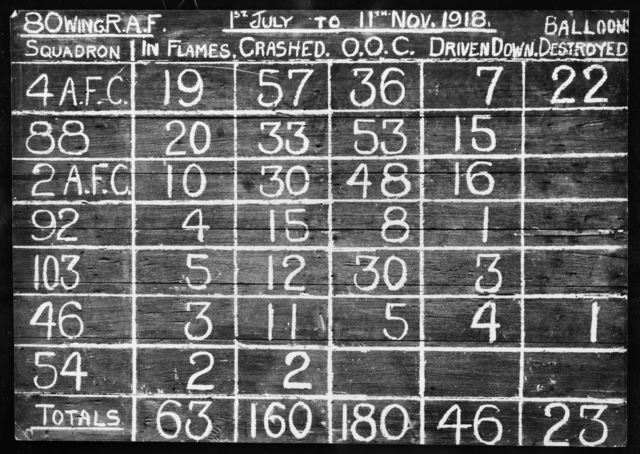
A scoreboard listing the claims for aircraft destroyed by No. 80 Wing between July and November 1918.

No. 103 Squadron was formed during the Great War as No. 103 Squadron, RFC at RAF Beaulieu, Hampshire on 1 September 1917, equipped with Airco DH.9 aircraft.

In May 1918 the Squadron was transferred to France and flew reconnaissance and day bombing operations on the Western Front. That June, following the foundation of the Royal Air Force, the squadron became part of No. 80 Wing RAF. The Squadron was disbanded on 1 October 1919 at RAF Shotwick, Flintshire.

=== Reformation ===
The Squadron was reformed on 10 August 1936 at RAF Andover, Hampshire as No. 103 (Bomber) Squadron, a light bomber Squadron flying biplane Hawker Hind bombers. The Squadron was then posted to RAF Usworth in County Durham. In July 1938 103 Squadron was re-equipped with the more advanced Fairey Battle monoplane bomber.

=== World War II ===
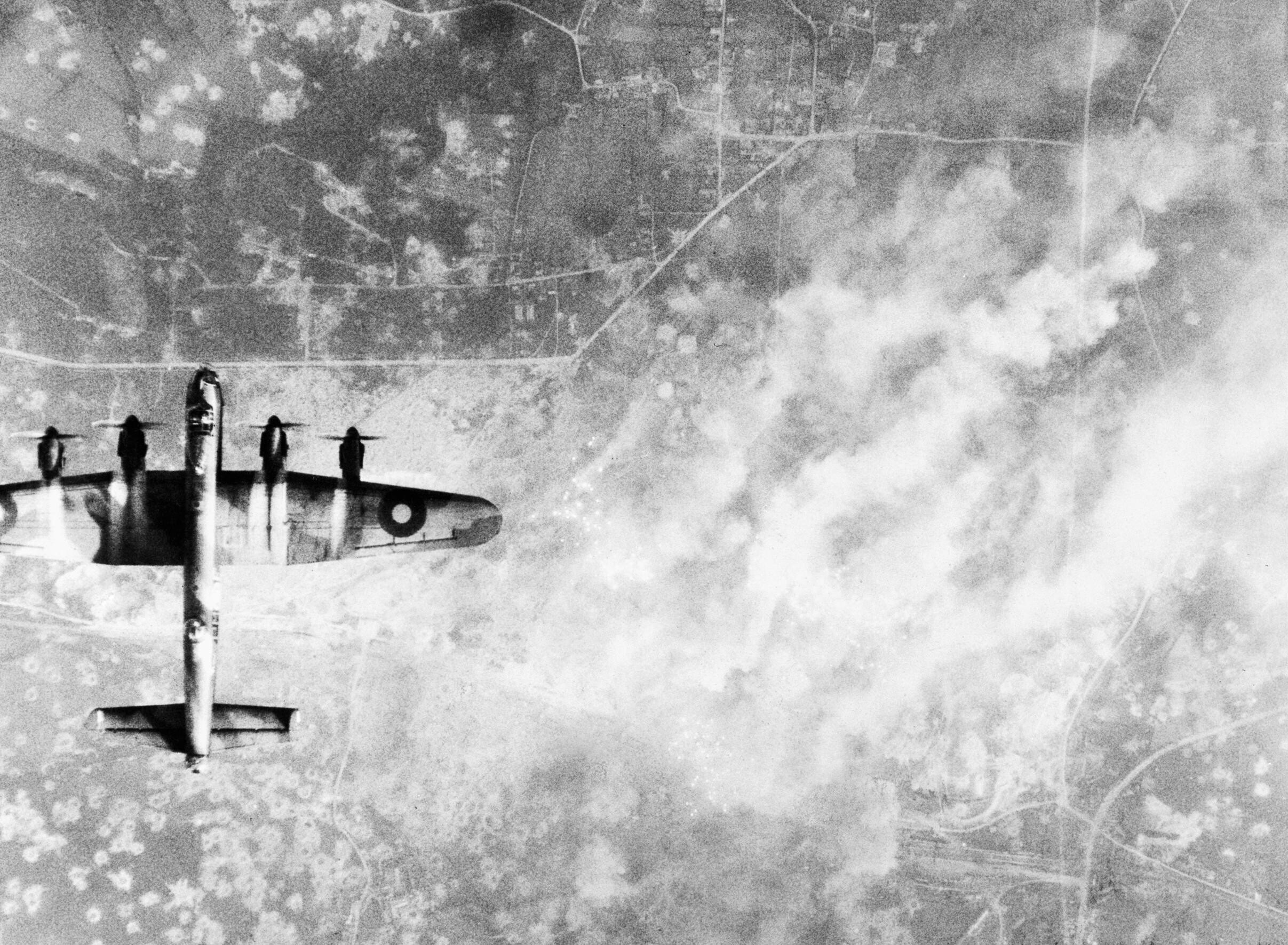
103 Squadron Lancaster over the German V-2 launch site at Wizernes, France

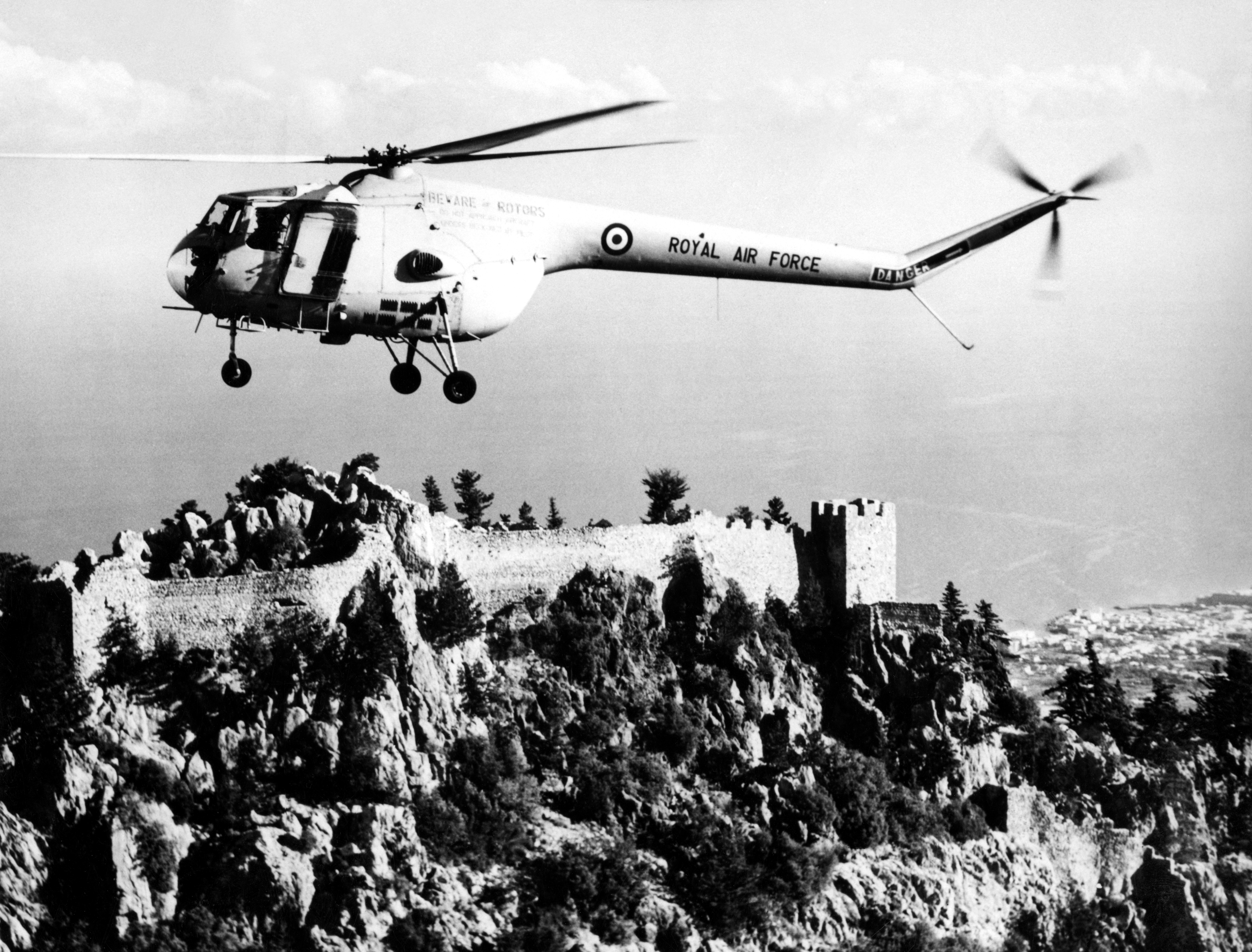
103 Squadron Sycamore over Cyprus, 1961

At the outbreak of the Second World War the Squadron was deployed to France as part of the RAF Advanced Air Striking Force. On 10 May 1940 the Luftwaffe and the German Army invaded France, Belgium and the Netherlands. The Squadron suffered many losses. In mid June 1940 the Squadron withdrew from France for RAF Abingdon in England. 103 Squadron was transferred to RAF Newton near Nottingham and reverted to the control of No. 1 Group RAF, Bomber Command. In October 1940 it was re-equipped with Wellington bombers. Operations were carried out with this type on targets on mainland Europe. The Squadron moved into the new airfield at RAF Elsham Wolds in July 1941. In July 1942 the Wellingtons were replaced by Halifax bombers. These were in turn replaced in late October 1942 by Avro Lancaster bombers, which 103 Squadron flew on many operations to Germany and occupied Europe for the rest of the war.

During the war 103 Squadron flew over 6,000 operational sorties, at a high cost in men and machines. On 14 February 1943, the squadron was sent to bomb Milan in Northern Italy but the bomber leading the formation was hit by incendiary bombs dropped from another Lancaster over the target and crashed in the southern outskirts of the city. Some parts of the bomber were discovered in 1990 during the extension of the Milan Metro. After the war, on 26 November 1945, the Squadron was disbanded by renumbering it to 57 Squadron.

=== On jet bombers in RAF Germany ===
103 Squadron was subsequently reformed at RAF Gütersloh, West Germany on 30 November 1954 and was part of the 2nd Tactical Air Force. During this short period the unit flew the English Electric Canberra bomber. The Squadron was however again disbanded on 1 August 1956.

=== On helicopters in Cyprus ===
103 Squadron reformed at RAF Nicosia, Cyprus on 1 August 1959 after renumbering of 284 Squadron. From then onwards it became a support unit with Bristol Sycamore HR.14 helicopters operating in search and rescue, casualty evacuation and internal security roles. 103 Squadron was disbanded on 31 July 1963 by breaking the squadron up into Nos. 1563 (at Nicosia) and 1564 (at El Adem) flights.

=== In the Far East ===
103 Squadron itself was reformed in the Far East at RAF Seletar, Singapore on 1 August 1963 by renumbering 110 Squadron. At that time it was equipped with Westland Whirlwind HAR.10 helicopters. In 1969 the Squadron was posted to RAF Changi and subsequently moved to RAF Tengah in 1971. In November 1972 the Westland Whirlwind was replaced with the more modern and capable Westland Wessex helicopter, but three years later 103 Squadron was disbanded for the last time, on 1 August 1975 at RAF Tengah.

== Aircraft operated ==
Aircraft operated by No. 103 Squadron RAF
From	To	Aircraft	Version
December 1917	March 1919	Airco DH.9	
August 1936	Late 1938	Hawker Hind	
Late 1938	October 1940	Fairey Battle	Mk.I
October 1940	July 1942	Vickers Wellington	Mk.Ic
July 1942	October 1942	Handley Page Halifax	Mk.II
October 1942	November 1945	Avro Lancaster	Mks.I & III
November 1954	August 1956	English Electric Canberra	B.2
August 1959	July 1963	Bristol Sycamore	HR.14
August 1963	November 1972	Westland Whirlwind	HAR.10
November 1972	August 1975	Westland Wessex	HC.2

== Squadron bases ==
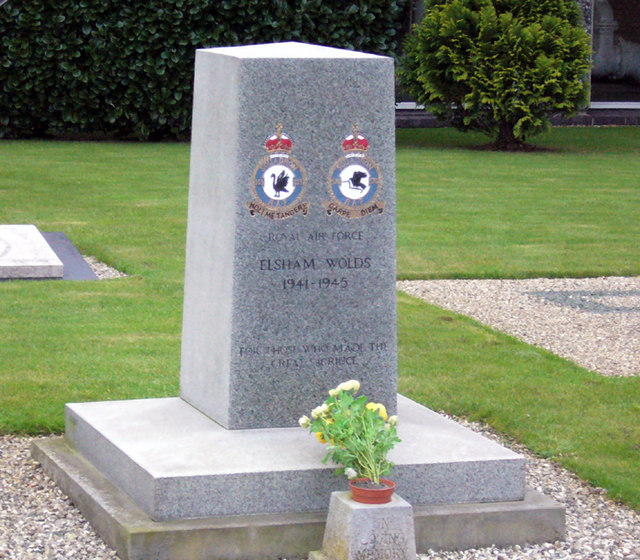
Memorial dedicated at former RAF Elsham Wolds to those lost on operations from no. 103 Squadron and 576 Squadron RAF

Bases and airfields used by No. 103 Squadron RAF
From	To	Base	Remarks
1 September 1917	8 September 1917	RFCS Beaulieu, Hampshire	Formed here as RFC unit
8 September 1917	12 May 1918	RFCS Old Sarum, Wiltshire	
12 May 1918	21 October 1918	Serny, France	
21 October 1918	26 October 1918	Floringhem, France	
26 October 1918	25 January 1919	Rochin, France	
25 January 1919	26 March 1919	Maisoncelle, France	
26 March 1919	1 October 1919	RAF Shotwick, Flintshire	1st Disbandment
10 August 1936	26 February 1937	RAF Andover, Hampshire	
26 February 1937	2 September 1938	RAF Usworth, County Durham	
2 September 1938	1 April 1939	RAF Abingdon, Oxfordshire	
1 April 1939	2 September 1939	RAF Benson, Oxfordshire	
2 September 1939	28 November 1939	Challerange, France	
28 November 1939	15 February 1940	Plivot, France	
15 February 1940	16 May 1940	Bétheniville, France	
16 May 1940	4 June 1940	Rhèges/Saint-Lucien Ferme	
4 June 1940	14 June 1940	Ouzouer-le-Doyen, France	
14 June 1940	15 June 1940	Sougé, France	
15 June 1940	16 June 1940	RAF Abingdon, Oxfordshire	Air echelon only
16 June 1940	3 July 1940	RAF Honington, Suffolk	
3 July 1940	11 July 1941	RAF Newton, Nottingham	
11 July 1941	26 November 1945	RAF Elsham Wolds, Lincolnshire	2nd Disbandment
30 November 1954	1 August 1956	RAF Gütersloh, West Germany	3rd Disbandment
1 August 1959	31 July 1963	RAF Nicosia, Cyprus	4th Disbandment
1 August 1963	28 March 1969	RAF Seletar, Singapore	
28 March 1969	15 September 1971	RAF Changi, Singapore	
15 September 1971	31 July 1975	RAF Tengah, Singapore	5th Disbandment
