= Brigg railway station =

Station which serves the town of Brigg in North Lincolnshire, England

Brigg
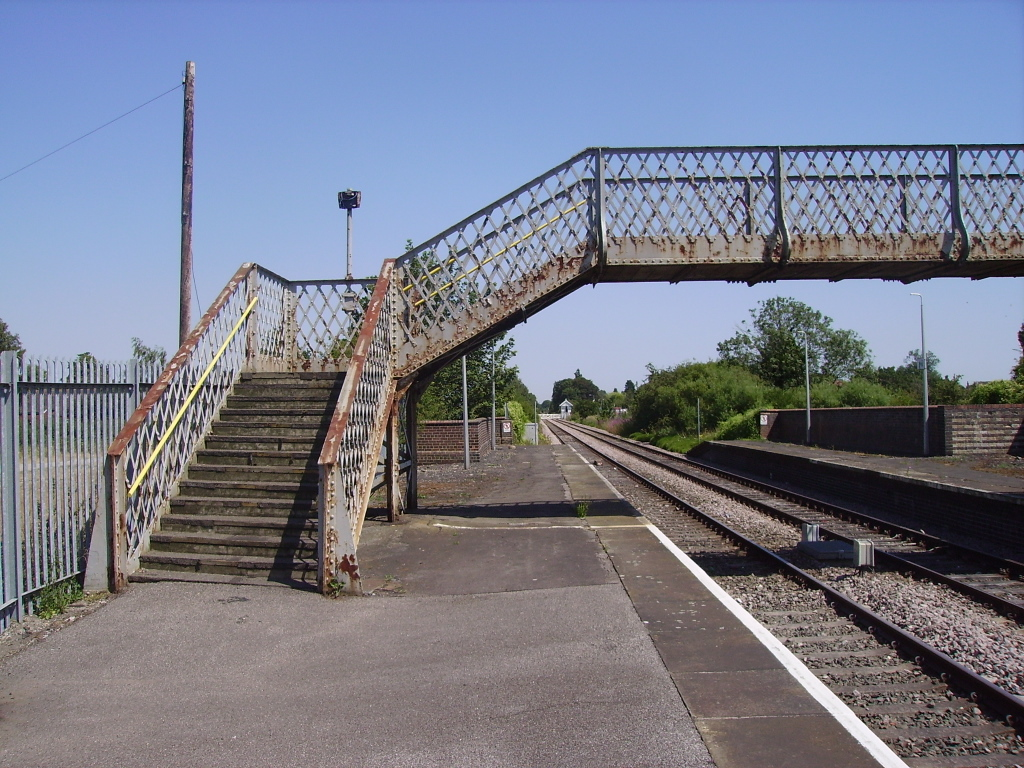
- Platform one, looking east towards Barnetby

General information
- Location: Brigg, North Lincolnshire; England
- Coordinates: 53.549°N 0.486°W
- Grid reference: TA004068
- Manager: Northern Trains
- Platforms: 2

Other information
- Station code: BGG
- Classification: DfT category F2

History
- Original company: Great Grimsby and Sheffield Junction Railway
- Pre-grouping: Great Central Railway
- Post-grouping: London and North Eastern Railway

Key dates
- 1 November 1848: Station opened

Passengers
- 2021/22: ▲632
- 2022/23: ▼288
- 2023/24: ▲1,018
- 2024/25: ▲1,636
- 2025/26: ▲1,784
Location
Notes
- Passenger statistics from the Office of Rail and Road

Brigg railway station serves the town of Brigg in North Lincolnshire, England. It opened on 1 November 1848. It is currently managed by Northern Trains, who also operate all passenger trains serving it.

== History ==
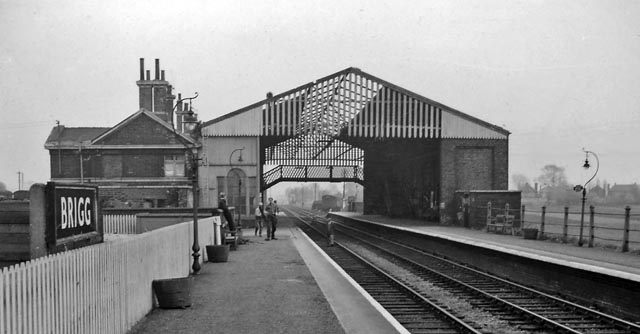
The station in 1961

It was built by the Great Grimsby and Sheffield Junction Railway (GG&SJR) and opened on 1 November 1848. The GG&SJR subsequently became part of the Manchester, Sheffield and Lincolnshire Railway main line between Grimsby and Manchester Piccadilly.

In 2016, the footbridge was replaced, with the 1880s structure acquired by the Wensleydale Railway and installed at Leyburn.

== Design ==
The station is unstaffed and the only buildings are the bus shelters standing on the platforms now for cover.

== Services ==
All services at Brigg are operated by Northern Trains.

From 21 May 2023, the station is served by a parliamentary service of one train per day towards Cleethorpes and one train per day towards Sheffield on weekdays only. These services run fast between Worksop and Sheffield.

Prior to the May 2023 timetable change, the station had been served by three trains per day in each direction on Saturdays only, with weekday services having been withdrawn by British Rail at the end of the summer timetable in October 1993.

Preceding station	National Rail	Following station
Kirton Lindsey	Northern Trains Brigg Branch Line Limited service	Barnetby
	Historical railways	
Scawby Line open, station closed	Great Central Railway Great Grimsby and Sheffield Junction Railway	Barnetby Line and station open
