= Rochin =

Rochin is a surname. Notable people with the surname include:

- Aaron Rochin, American sound engineer
- Refugio Rochin (born 1941), American professor

== See also ==
- Rochin v. California, case decided by the Supreme Court of the United States
- Tinbe-rochin, weapons combination of a short spear (rochin) and a shield (tinbe)
