= 1817 in rail transport =

This article lists events related to rail transport that occurred in 1817.

== Events ==
- Approximate date – Britain's longest tramroad tunnel is opened at Pwll du near Blaenavon in South Wales. The Pwll Du Tunnel is more than a mile (2400 m) in length. Begun as a mineral adit, at this time it carries a horse-drawn double track plateway of approximately 2 ft (600 mm) gauge carrying material for Blaenavon Ironworks; next summer it will be incorporated in Thomas Hill's Tramroad.

== Births ==
=== March births ===
- March 26 - Herman Haupt, United States railroad civil engineer (d. 1905).

=== June births ===
- June 20 - Silas Seymour, chief engineer and/or consulting engineer for several railroads in New York in the mid- to late 19th century (d. 1890).

=== July births ===
- July 1 – Hugh J. Jewett, president of the Erie Railroad 1874–1884 (d. 1898).
- July 15 – John Fowler, British civil engineer (d. 1898).

=== October births ===
- October 2 – Webster Wagner, founder of Wagner Palace Car Company (d. 1883).
- October 17 – Alexander Mitchell, president of Chicago, Milwaukee and St. Paul Railway 1864–1887 (d. 1887).

=== Unknown date births ===
- Matthew Baird, second owner of Baldwin Locomotive Works (d. 1877)
- Walter McQueen, Chief mechanical engineer for the Albany and Schenectady Railroad 1845–1850, Hudson River Railroad 1850–1852, and superintendent of Schenectady Locomotive Works 1852–1876 (d. 1893).
