= 1898 Wrawby Junction rail crash =

Railway incident in Lincolnshire, England

- Scene of the railway disaster at Wrawby (The Illustrated London News, 1898)

Details
- Date: 17 October 1898; 17:25
- Location: Wrawby Junction, Lincolnshire
- Coordinates: 53.5701°N 0.4197°W
- Country: England
- Line: Great Central Railway
- Cause: Goods train derailment

Statistics
- Trains: 2
- Deaths: 8
- Injured: 26

On 17 October 1898 at Wrawby Junction, on what was the Great Central Railway near Brigg in Lincolnshire, England, a passenger train collided with a derailed goods train; killing 8 people and injuring 26 more.

The passenger train was the 16:45 from Cleethorpes to Manchester consisting of a brake van, three passenger carriages and a rear guard's van. The goods train which had left Grimsby earlier in the day for Doncaster consisted of 44 waggons loaded with larch tree trunks, three trunks to a load secured with chains. The length of the trunks (up to 42 ft (13 m)) necessitated the close coupling of the waggons. The goods train was being shunted on a curve at low speed adjacent to the main line when five trucks derailed just as the passenger train approached. One truck toppled over; its load of timber projecting over the main line. The brake van 'was carried away with the exception of the offside and roof'. The next two carriages were 'clean swept away' above the floor level; the first compartment of the third passenger carriage was also destroyed.

The investigation admitted that it was not possible to stop shunting operations from occurring on lines parallel and close to passenger running lines.

== Sources ==
- The Times 1898 :
  - 18 October page 6 "Serious Railway Accident"
  - 19 October page 7 "The Serious Railway Accident"
  - 20 October page 6 "The Serious Railway Accident"
- The Times 1899 :
  - 6 January page 7 "The Wrawby Junction Accident"
