= Blyton =

Village and civil parish within the West Lindsey district of Lincolnshire, England

Coordinates: 53.444°N 0.714°W

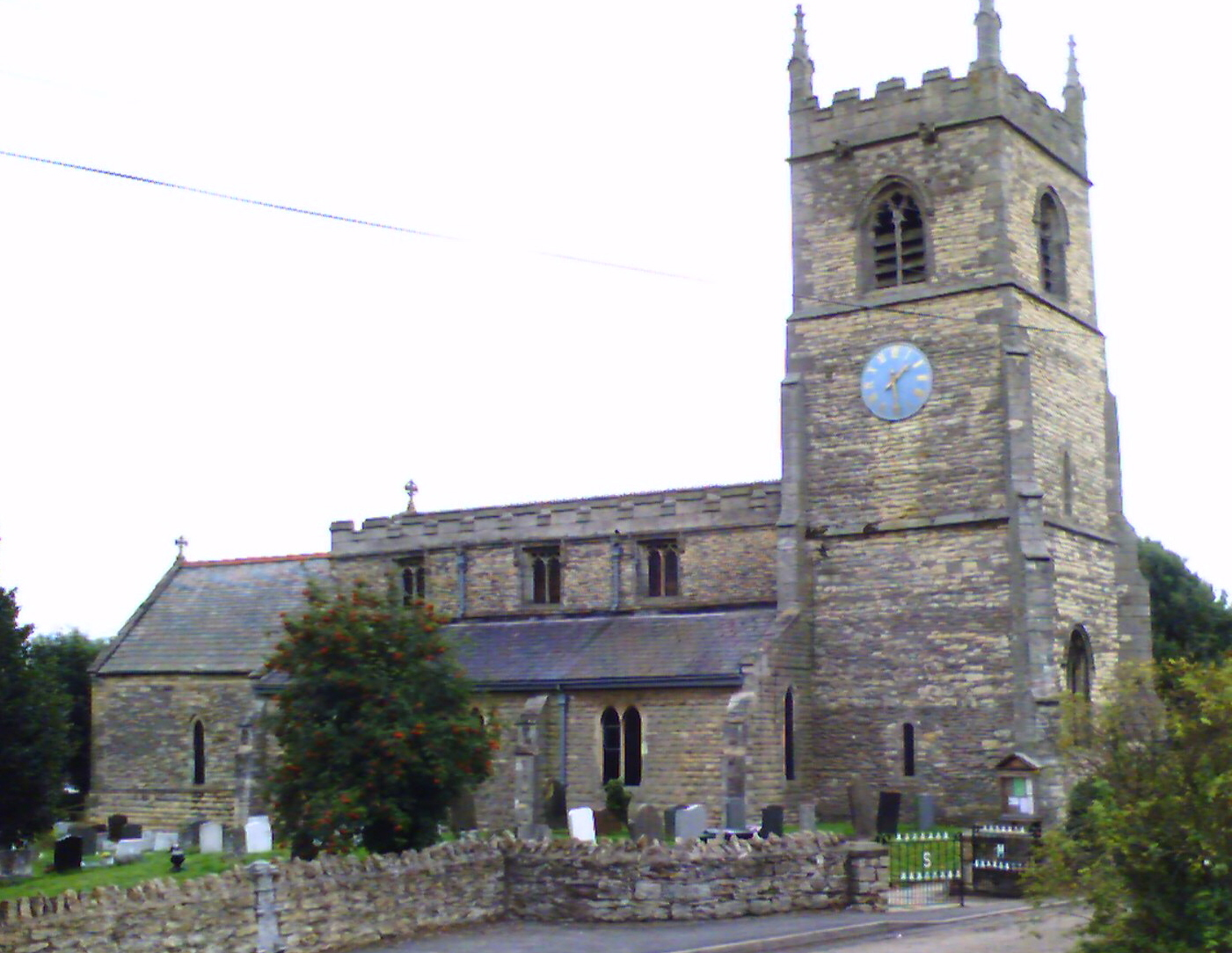
- Church of Saint Martin de Tours, Blyton

- Location within Lincolnshire
- Population: 1,383 (2011 census)
- OS grid reference: SK855945
  - London: 135 mi (217 km) S
- District: West Lindsey
- Shire county: Lincolnshire
- Region: East Midlands
- Country: England
- Sovereign state: United Kingdom
- Post town: GAINSBOROUGH
- Postcode district: DN21
- Dialling code: 01427
- Police: Lincolnshire
- Fire: Lincolnshire
- Ambulance: East Midlands

Blyton is a village and civil parish within the West Lindsey district of Lincolnshire, England. It is situated approximately 4 miles (6 km) north-east from Gainsborough. From Blyton the village of Laughton lies to the north, and Pilham to the south-east, while the course of the River Trent runs nearby to the west.

Blyton had a population of 1,086 (including Thonock) in the 2001 census, increasing to 1,383 at the 2011 census.

== History ==
According to A Dictionary of British Place Names Blyton derives from a combination of the Old Norse and Old English Bligr+ton, meaning "farmstead of a man called Bligr". The settlement is listed in the Domesday Book as "Blitone".

Blyton Windmill was built in 1825. It worked by wind until 1910, then by engine until the late 1960s. It was converted to residential accommodation in 1974. Great Central Railway's heavy rail line between Gainsborough and Grimsby came to Blyton around 1848, whereby Blyton railway station was established within the parish. Although the line is still operational, the station has closed.

During the Second World War, Blyton was home to the bomber airfield RAF Blyton, just north-east of the village. It was abandoned in 1954. The B1205 road skirts the southern border of the old airfield, and the A159 runs through its western edge. Today the airfield has been converted into Blyton Park, a tarmac circuit for motor sports and karting.

== Governance ==
From a very early time, Blyton was part of an ancient parish, Blyton cum Wharton, within the historic county boundaries of the Parts of Lindsey in Lincolnshire

In March 1886 a part of Pilham parish, known as Pilham Carr, was transferred to Blyton. Some records refer to it simply as "Carr".

For governance, Blyton parish was in the Corringham Wapentake in the West Lindsey district of the Parts of Lindsey. From 1894 until 1974 it lay within Gainsborough Rural District in the administrative county of Lindsey.

Since 1974 Blyton has been within the shire district of West Lindsey.

== Churches ==
The Grade I listed Anglican church, established in the 11th century, is dedicated to St Martin. The lower parts of the tower are Norman and sections of the aisle are Early English. The chancel was rebuilt in 1877, but retains a window from c.1300. The font is of Perpendicular style. The north wall of the chancel bears an inscription to the children (d.1613 and 1615) of Sir John Wray.

There is also a Primitive Methodist chapel built in 1851.

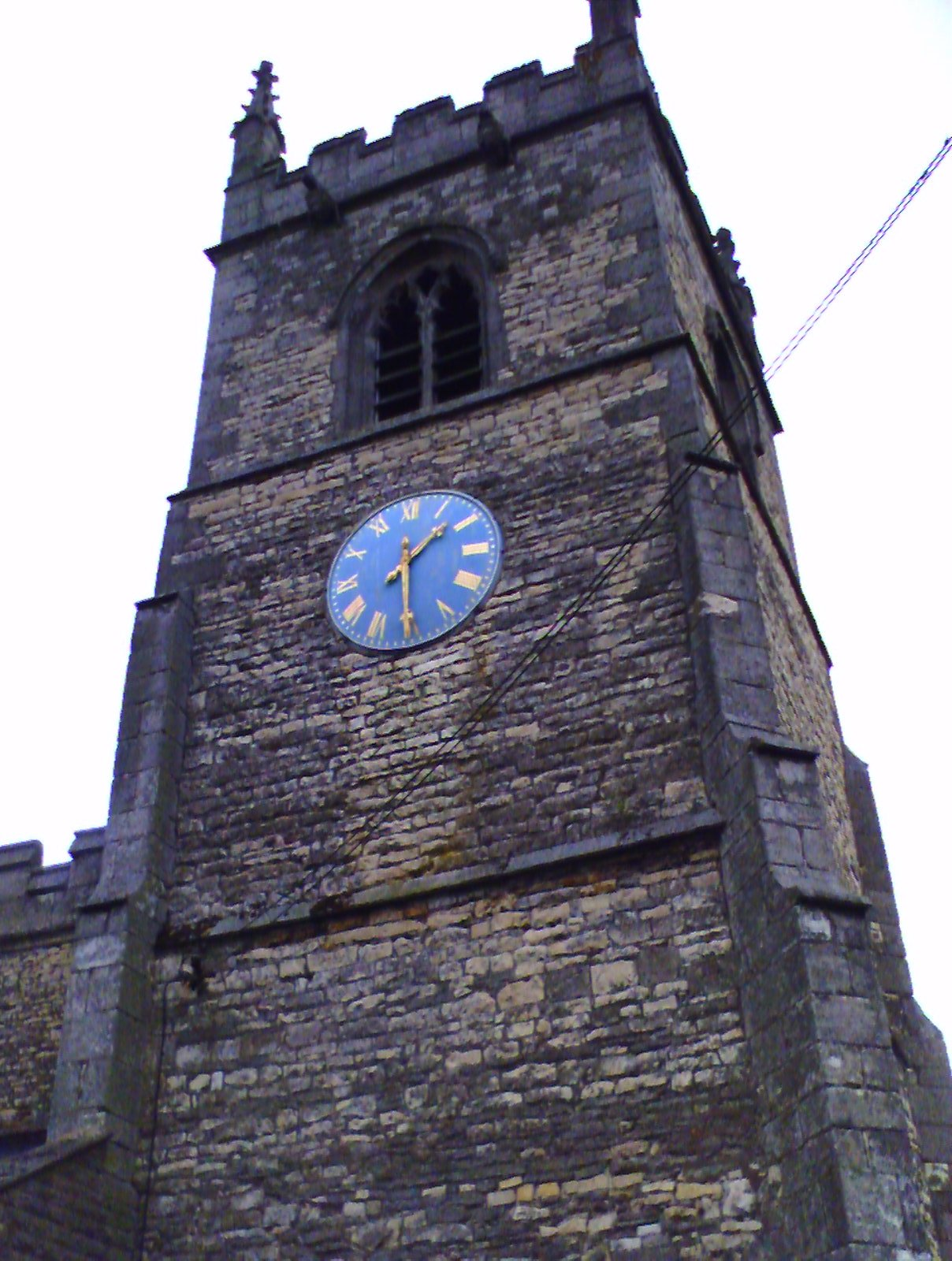
Church tower and clock

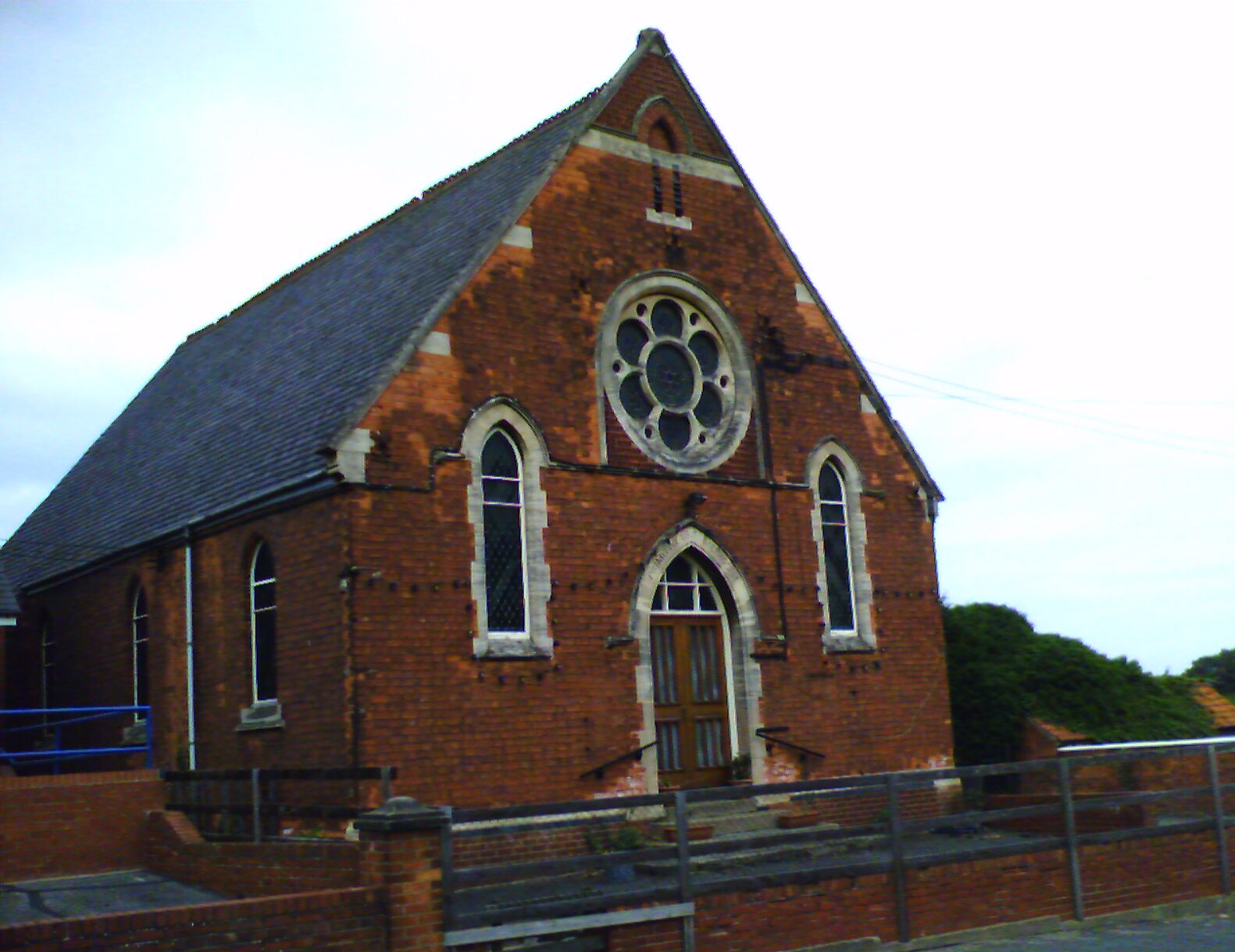
Primitive Methodist chapel
