= RAF Elsham Wolds =

Former RAF station in Lincolnshire, England

RAF Elsham Wolds
- Elsham, Lincolnshire in England
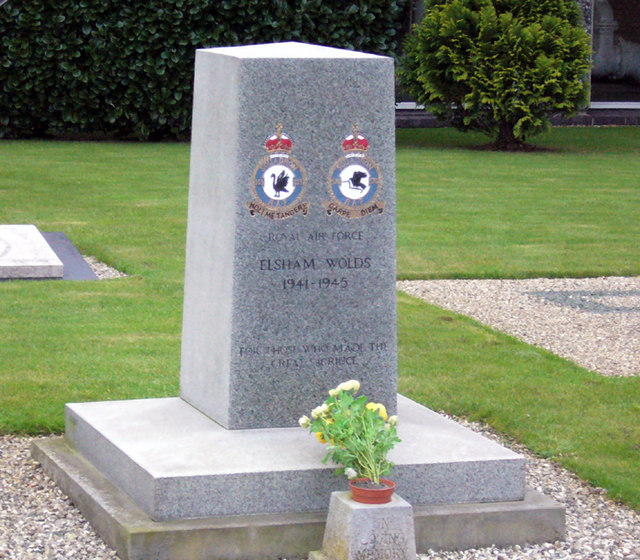
- Memorial dedicated to those lost on operations

Site information
- Type: Royal Air Force station 1941-43; 13 Base 1943-47
- Code: ES
- Owner: Air Ministry
- Operator: Royal Air Force
- Controlled by: RAF Bomber Command * No. 1 Group RAF

Location
- Shown within Lincolnshire RAF Elsham Wolds (the United Kingdom)
- Coordinates: 53°36′23″N 000°25′19″W

Site history
- Built: 1916
- In use: 1916-1919; July 1941-1947
- Battles/wars: European theatre of World War II

Airfield information
- Elevation: 73 metres (240 ft) AMSL
Runways
Direction	Length and surface
01/19	1,280 metres (4,199 ft) Asphalt
06/24	1,463 metres (4,800 ft) Asphalt
13/31	1,829 metres (6,001 ft) Asphalt

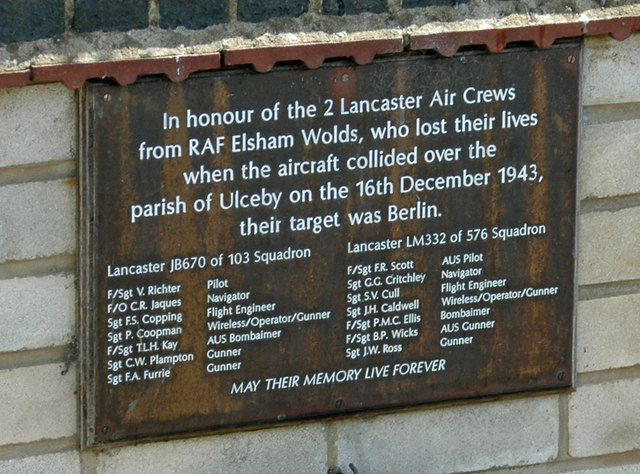
Plaque adjacent to Ulceby War Memorial

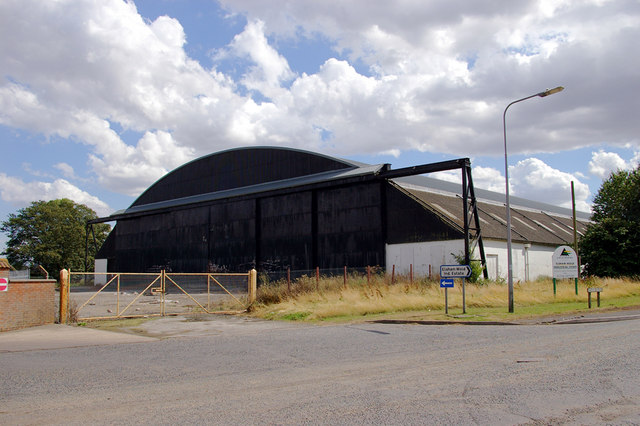
Surviving J-Type hangar inside Elsham Wold Industrial Estate

Royal Air Force Elsham Wolds or more simply RAF Elsham Wolds is a former Royal Air Force station in England, which operated in the First World War and the Second World War. It is located just to the north east of the village of Elsham in north Lincolnshire.

== First World War ==
An airfield was established at Elsham as early as December 1916 and used by C Flight of No. 33 Squadron of the Royal Flying Corps, initially operating F.E.2 and later Avro 504 and Bristol F.2 Fighter biplanes. From June 1918 to June 1919 it was also the squadron's headquarters, taking over from Gainsborough.

The site was the most northerly of three airfields, along with RAF Kirton in Lindsey (B Flight) and RAF Scampton (A Flight), equally spaced between the cities of Hull and Lincoln for countering Zeppelin night raids. C Flight also acted as observers for the artillery batteries located at Spurn Head and Kilnsea.

The flight stayed at Elsham until June 1918, the wooden huts and a small aircraft shed that had been erected were demolished by 1919 when the station was abandoned back to agriculture at the end of the First World War.

== Second World War ==
In the late 1930s with a new war on the horizon, extra airfields were again needed to accommodate an expansion of the RAF. Former First World War stations were surveyed for suitability, and an area just to the west of the original Elsham site was deemed to be better suited.

Work began in the winter of 1939–1940, and the station opened with the arrival in July 1941 of 103 Squadron. The station was equipped with a main runway 2,000 yards (1,829 m) long, and two subsidiaries of 1,600 yards (1,463 m) and 1,400 yards (1,280 m). Three hangars (two T-2's and one J-Type) and 27 aircraft hardstands (later increased to 36) were built. Three more T-2 hangars were built in 1944. Accommodation for around 2,500 personnel was dispersed in the nearby farmland.

No. 103 is credited with more operational sorties than any other No. 1 Group RAF squadron, and consequently suffered the group's highest losses. Of the 248 bombers lost on operations flying from Elsham Wolds, 198 were from No. 103 Squadron. By type, losses were 28 Vickers Wellingtons, 12 Halifaxes and 208 Lancasters. One Elsham Wolds Lancaster, Lancaster III ED888 M2 (Mike Squared) which served with both Nos. 103 and 576, held the Bomber Command record for operational sorties, having completed 140 between May 1943 and December 1944. A total of 974 operational hours.

Australian Don Charlwood was a navigator operating out of Elsham Wolds. In his highly regarded memoir, "No Moon Tonight", he writes movingly about his many comrades who died, those that did not (a much smaller number), and about the feelings of aircrews facing such high loss rates. Describing his arrival at Elsham Wolds with a group of 20 other young men, he wrote: ". . . of our twenty only eight were destined to depart . . . a few months later."

== Post war ==
RAF Elsham Wolds closed in 1947 and shortly afterwards DP's (Displaced Persons), Poles and Ukrainians were temporarily housed in the buildings whilst working at the Scunthorpe Steelworks. Some contemplated transit to the US or Canada, others to set roots, mostly in Scunthorpe. Colloquially, it started to be known as "Warsaw Hamlet" and the Post Office delivered letters using that address. By the late 1952 early '53 the DP's had moved on and once again the site reverted to first agriculture use and later as the site of an industrial estate. The history of the site is reflected in the road names on the estate which include Halifax Approach and Wellington Way. In the 1970s the site was bisected by the A15 road that was built to link the M180 motorway to the Humber Bridge. The control tower lasted into the 1980s and was used as a house for a time, which was said to be haunted. The J-Type hangar is still standing.

== Current use ==
A large radio and telephone mast has been placed on top of Elsham hill.

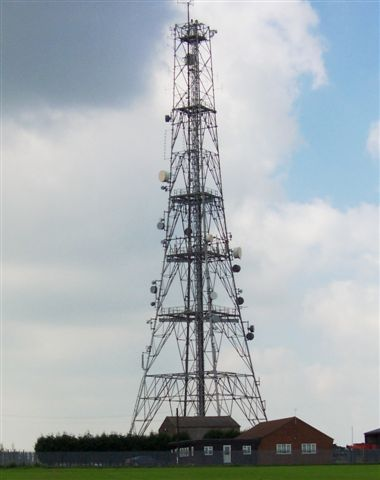
Elsham Hill. The large radio and telephone mast on top of Elsham hill, on land that once was the war time bomber airfield of RAF Elsham Wold

The tower is at the west end of the main runway and during the 60s was used to relay radar from RAF Patrington and RAF Staxton Wold to RAF Lindholme near Doncaster.

A memorial garden is located in the southwestern part of the old aerodrome site.

== Squadrons ==
Squadron	Aircraft	Date arrived	Date departed
33 C Flight	F.E.2	December 1916	June 1918
33 C Flight	Bristol F.2 Fighter	June 1918	August 1918
33 C Flight	Avro 504	August 1918	June 1919
103 re-numbered 57 November 1945	Wellington IC	October 1940	July 1942
103 re-numbered 57 November 1945	Halifax II	July 1942	October 1942
103 re-numbered 57 November 1945	Lancaster B I and B III	October 1942	December 1945
576	Lancaster B I and B III	November 1943	October 1944
100	Lancaster B I and B III	April 1945	December 1945
1656 HCU	Halifax	April 1942	October 1942
1662 HCU	Halifax I, II, III, V	January 1945	April 1945
21 HGCU	Halifax	February 1945	December 1946
21 HGCU	Albemarle	February 1945	December 1946
