= Don Charlwood =

Australian author (1915–2012)

- Born: Donald Ernest Cameron Charlwood; 6 September 1915; Melbourne, Victoria
- Died: 18 June 2012 (aged 96); Melbourne, Victoria
- Military career
- Branch: RAAF
- Service years: 1941–1945
- Rank: Flight Lieutenant
- Service number: 408794
- Units: No. 103 Squadron RAF, RAF Bomber Command
- Conflicts: Second World War
- Other work: Writer, Air Traffic Control

Donald Ernest Cameron Charlwood AM (6 September 1915 – 18 June 2012) was an Australian author. He also worked as a farm hand, an air traffic controller and, most notably, as an RAAF navigator in Bomber Command during the Second World War.

While best known for No Moon Tonight, his fictionalised memoir of life as a crew member in RAF Bomber Command (the fiction is revealed by comparing his straight autobiographical account of those experiences, Journeys into Night), Charlwood wrote a number of other biographical, fiction and non-fiction works.

== Early life ==
Born in Melbourne, Victoria, in 1915, Charlwood's family moved to Frankston, Victoria when he was eight. Charlwood left Frankston High School in his Leaving Certificate year, to take a job with a local estate agency and produce market. When approaching 18 years of age he was required to train his replacement, and found himself unemployed in 1933. He took a holiday at a relative's farm, Burnside, near Nareen, in south-west Victoria. He found the life enjoyable and was invited back to work there for the shearing and harvest of 1934. During this time he completed a short-story course by correspondence with the London School of Journalism and had a number of stories published, sometimes under the pseudonym E. K. Dwyer.

At Burnside, Charlwood was already writing and occasionally supplemented his wages by selling articles and short stories. He remained there through the thirties, but in 1940, as war unfolded in Europe and France, and the Low Countries fell, he signed up for the RAAF, and was placed on the reserve.

== Military service ==
For the rest of 1940, Charlwood worked at The 21 Lessons – a course to ensure candidates were fitted for the theoretical work of initial training. In May 1941, after 11 months on the reserve, Charlwood was called up and posted to No 1. Initial Training School, Somers, Victoria. From Somers, he proceeded to Sydney and then to Vancouver in Canada. Their trip to Canada on the liner SS Monterey was the first across the Pacific by Australian service personnel on a ship registered in neutral America. On reaching Vancouver, Charlwood along with the rest of his group, was sent to Edmonton in Alberta. In October 1942, they started their training as bomb-aimer/navigators on Course 35 of No. 2 Air Observer Training School, Empire Air Training Scheme. Six months, a number of courses and stations, and around 160 hours of flying time later, initial training was complete.

In May 1943, Charlwood and his course travelled to England, on the Polish liner MS Batory anchoring on the River Clyde on the evening of 12 May. Here the course was split, with Charlwood and half of them posted to No. 3 Advanced Flying Unit, Bobbington, between the Severn Valley and Birmingham. After completing Advanced Flying, aircrew were posted to Operational Training Units, their entry into combat operations. Charlwood was posted to No, 27 OTU, Lichfield – a unit that fed Bomber Command. He had almost 200 hours’ flying time.

At Tatenhill, a satellite airfield of Lichfield, Charlwood, with Pilot Geoff Maddern, crewed up to form a crew of five – the basis of all his future flying in Bomber Command. On 1 August 1942 they flew together as a crew for the first time, in a Wellington Bomber. On the night of 5 September 1942, they made their last training flight. Charlwood's total flying time was now just under 257 hours. Training completed, they were posted to fly with No. 103 Squadron RAF, Elsham Wolds. Soon after joining the squadron converted from Handley Page Halifaxes to Avro Lancasters. Charlwood completed a full tour of 30 operations, the first 103 Squadron to survive a tour in nine months, and was then "screened" to training duties with 27 OTU. Of the 20 men who had qualified as navigators with Charlwood, only five were alive at the end of the war. He was subsequently mustered for repatriation to Australia via the US where he was to train for duties in the Pacific theatre on Considated Liberator 4-engined bombers.

== Later life ==
When back problems ended his flying career in the US, Charlwood returned to Australia. On route to Australia, Charlwood detoured to Edmonton, Canada, where he married Nell East, who he had first met when training as a Navigator in 1941.

Following his return to Australia he was invalided out of the RAAF in July 1945, and commenced work with the Department of Civil Aviation, initially as an Air Traffic Controller, and later in training and recruitment. It was while working at the DCA that he wrote No Moon Tonight relying heavily on diaries he kept during training and operational flying.

By 1965, when he came to write All the Green Year, he and wife Nell had four children, including two teenage daughters.

He became Vice President of the Victorian branch of the Fellowship of Australian writers in 1975 and held the position for 15 years.

In 1992, Charlwood was made a Member of the Order of Australia in recognition of service to literature. He died in June 2012.

== Books / Critical reception ==
All the Green Year (1965) has been described as a perceptive observation of Australian childhood. The critic A. A. Phillips wrote, "The first part reads as a book about boys; the second part – the flight from home – as a book for boys". The book sold more than 100,000 copies and there were 21 editions between 1965 and 1983. All the Green Year features in the anthology, The Australian Collection: Australia's Greatest Books.

In 1980, All the Green Year was made into a television series.

No Moon Tonight (1956) and Journeys into Night (1991) have been described as among the finest autobiographical works on Bomber Command in World War II.

== Bibliography ==
=== Autobiographical ===
- No Moon Tonight, Angus and Robertson, 1956.
- Marching as to War, Hudson, 1990. ISBN 978-0-949873-33-0 (Winner of the Fellowship of Australian Writers (Vic) Christina Stead Award in 1990)
- Journeys Into Night, Hudson, 1991. ISBN 978-0-949873-37-8

=== Novels ===
- All the Green Year, Angus and Robertson, 1965.

=== Short Story Collection ===
- Flight and Time, Neptune Press, 1979. ISBN 978-0-909131-21-0

=== Non Fiction ===
- An Afternoon of Time, Angus and Robertson, 1966.
- Take-Off to Touchdown: The Story of Air Traffic Control, Angus and Robertson, 1967.
- The Wreck of the Loch Ard: End of a Ship, End of an Era, Angus and Robertson, 1971. ISBN 978-0-207-12316-0
- Wrecks and Reputations: The Loss of the Schomberg and Loch Ard, Angus and Robertson, 1977. ISBN 978-0-207130-65-6
- Settlers Under Sail, Premier's Department, 1978. ISBN 978-0-7241-1684-3
- The Long Farewell, Penguin Books, 1981. ISBN 978-0-7139-1428-3
- The Wreck of the Sailing Ship Netherby: A Miracle of Survival, Burgewood Books, 2005. ISBN 978-1-876425-18-0
