= RAF Blyton =

Former RAF station in Lincolnshire, England

RAF Blyton
- Near Blyton, Lincolnshire in England

Site information
- Type: Royal Air Force satellite station
- Code: AL
- Owner: Air Ministry
- Operator: Royal Air Force
- Controlled by: RAF Bomber Command * No. 1 Group RAF * No. 7 (HCU) Group RAF

Location
- Shown within Lincolnshire RAF Blyton (the United Kingdom)
- Coordinates: 53°27′04″N 000°41′37″W

Site history
- Built: 1941/42
- In use: November 1942 - 1954
- Battles/wars: European theatre of World War II; Cold War

Airfield information
- Elevation: 70 feet (21 m) AMSL
Runways
Direction	Length and surface
00/00	Concrete
00/00	Concrete
00/00	Concrete

Royal Air Force Blyton or more simply RAF Blyton is a former Royal Air Force satellite station located 5 miles (8.0 km) north east of Gainsborough, Lincolnshire and 10 miles (16 km) south of Scunthorpe, England.

It was built in 1942 and was heavily used during the Second World War but it was used little after the early stages of the Cold War.

== History ==
- No. 199 Squadron RAF (1942-43)
- 'B' Flight of No. 1 Lancaster Finishing School RAF (November 1943 - February 1944)
- No. 7 Air Crew Holding Unit
- Sub site of No. 61 Maintenance Unit RAF (March 1946 - ?)
- Relief Landing Ground for No. 101 Flying Refresher School RAF (October 1951 - February 1952)
- Relief Landing Ground for No. 215 Advanced Flying School RAF (February 1952 - January 1954)
- No. 1481 Target Towing and Gunnery Flight RAF (September - November 1942)
- No. 1662 Heavy Conversion Unit RAF (January 1943 - April 1945)
- No. 2797 Squadron RAF Regiment
- Air Bomber Training Flight, No. 1 Group (September - November 1942)

== Current use ==
It is now used for off-road racing cars, rally driving and test running refurbished and/or new designs of trucks.

== See also ==
- List of former Royal Air Force stations
