= Edward Ashton =

Edward Ashton may refer to:

- Edward Ashton (colonel) (died 1658), English royalist colonel
- Teddy Ashton (1906–1978), English footballer
- Edward L. Ashton House, Iowa City

== See also ==
- Ned Ashton (disambiguation)
- Edward Ashton Gaskin Stuart (1918–2001), educator and labor leader
