= Balloon flange girder =

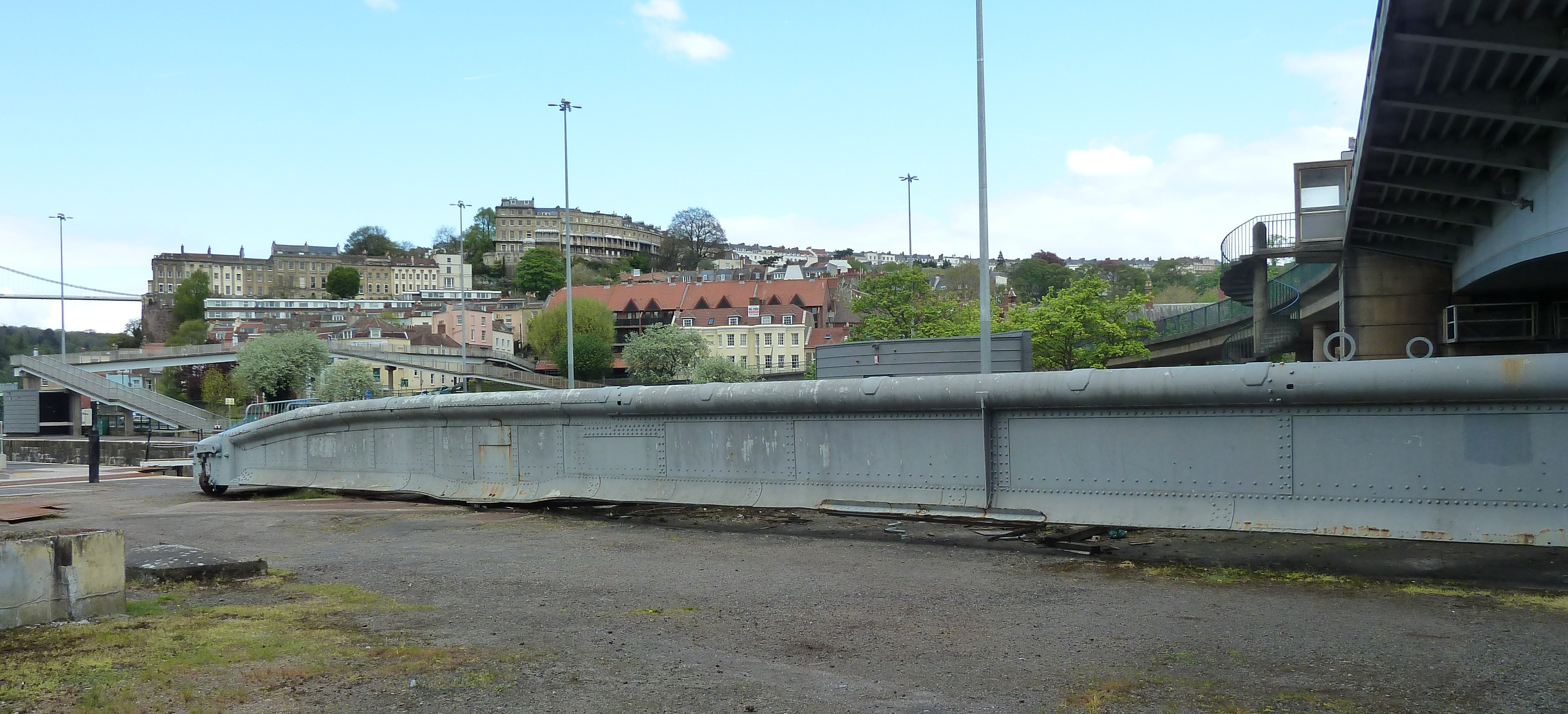
Brunel's bridges over the entrance locks to the Cumberland Basin, Bristol Harbour.

A balloon flange girder is a form of vertical I-beam wrought iron plate girder, where the top flange, instead of being a simple flat plate, is extended into a hollow tube. When a girder is subjected to a positive bending moment the top flange acts in compression making a flat plate flange more susceptible to local buckling than the balloon flange is.

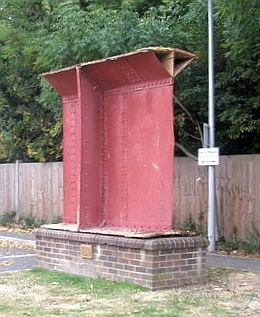
Surviving section of Chepstow Railway Bridge girder, now at Brunel University, Uxbridge

This type of girder was rarely used, its only common user being Isambard Kingdom Brunel in the 1840s and 1850s.

== Design ==
Brunel was working at a period of increased theoretical and mathematical analysis of bridge and mechanical structures. Together with the work of William Fairbairn, particularly in relation to Stephenson's tubular bridges such as Conwy, there was an increased understanding of how beams in compression would fail by buckling.

Brunel was known for his distrust of cast iron as a material, at least for large beams. (Note: This view has recently been challenged, in light of the large number of cast-iron bridges which Brunel designed.) This distrust of cast iron was vindicated when his friend Stephenson's adventurous cast-iron Dee Bridge (1846) collapsed in 1847. Brunel gave evidence in his support at the following inquiry, but this was on the basis of Stephenson being a competent engineer within the bounds of current knowledge, rather than in support of large cast-iron beams. Stephenson's Dee Bridge had used a truss girder, where an inverted T-shaped cast iron girder was trussed by applied wrought iron tension bars. This faulty design was instrumental in the bridge failure, where tension in the truss rods increased compression in the upper part of the girder such that it underwent columnar failure. Despite this, although with the advantage of hindsight, Brunel would use similar applied tension chains for his truss design.

Around the 1840s, developments in the puddling furnace reduced the cost of wrought iron and improvements to rolling mills allowed the production of large flat sections. This iron was now economic for the construction of girders, assembled by riveting of flat sections.

== Development ==
Brunel had already experimented with simple bulb-headed girders in cast iron, for the relatively short 35-foot span of Bishop's Bridge canal bridge at Paddington. These had a T-section lower flange in tension and a larger circular bulb at the upper edge, (Note: Brindle describes these as 40% larger in cross-section, although this is slightly narrower in linear dimension) in compression. As was his habit, Brunel hydraulically tested samples of these girders for strength in 1838 and recorded the results in one of his books of 'Facts'.

=== Experimental girder ===
To develop a reliable truss girder for long-span bridges, Brunel carried out a remarkable experiment with a full size girder. This used a single wrought iron plate girder, 70 ft in length, which was loaded up to the point of collapse, first with 165 tons load then, after repair, to 188 tons. (Note: Note that pagination varies between the 1870 edition of The Life of Isambard Kingdom Brunel, as reproduced at Google Books and the Cambridge facsimile edition, and the 2006 STEAM bicentenary edition. P. 193 in the original is now p. 146 in the 2006 STEAM edition. Page numbers are given here for the more affordable 2006 edition.) Brunel was aware that the likely failure mechanism of this girder was by buckling collapse in the upper flange, which would be under compression forces. To resist this, the flange was supported by triangulated plates and the flange was also slight curved. (Note: The section of this first girder resembles the section from Chepstow, now preserved at Brunel University. illus.) The experiment was a great success, the bridge eventually failing at a considerable load, representing an efficient use of construction materials for a bridge of this capacity, compared to previous designs.

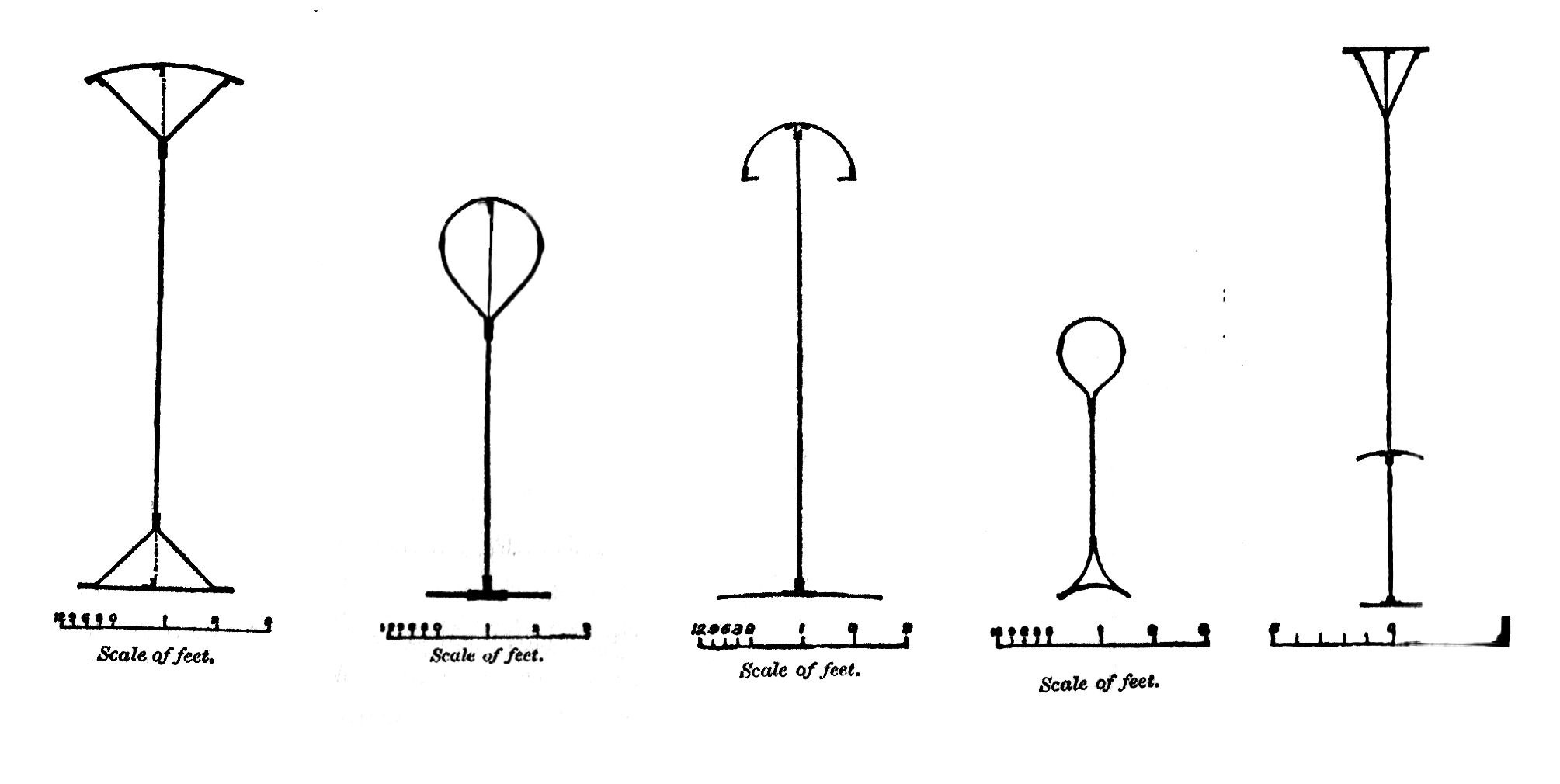
From the left: • Experimental girder (Chepstow Railway Bridge was similar) • South Wales Railway • Eastern Bengal Railway • Cumberland Basin bridges • Windsor Railway Bridge All girders are to the same scale, except for the Windsor truss that is half size.

=== South Wales Railway ===
Brunel made early and widespread use of this girder across his South Wales Railway. It was used for spans up to 100 feet, iron truss bridges being used beyond that.

Improvements in plate rolling allowed a change in the shape of the girder. Rather than merely a slightly curved top plate with triangular gussets, it was now possible to roll a semi-circular plate. This allowed the fully developed 'balloon' shape to be used, as in the second cross-section illustrated. The top web of the girder was semi-circular and riveted to the centre plate by an L-strip. The side gussets, also curved, were riveted parallel to the edges of this top plate, rather than through another L-strip, as used originally. Brunel (probably correctly) considered the smooth balloon profile to be a more efficient design, influenced by his geometric approaches to design rather than Eaton's mathematical analysis. More practically, the parallel lap joint halved the amount of riveting needed, compared to the L-strip.

None of these bridges are known to survive in their balloon form, although a girder from one was later re-used for bridge widening work (1861) across the Coity road near Bridgend and survived there. The Coity Road bridge had been built before this date, but was widened to accommodate the new Llynvi Valley Railway. One side of the bridge was moved outwards to accommodate a new siding and a balloon girder installed on that side. This girder (especially as it was installed after Brunel's death) is thought to have previously been used elsewhere on the SWR, although its original date and location is unknown.

Similar girders were used to cross the Severn at Over.

=== Eastern Bengal Railway ===
The next development retained the semicircular top flange, but the side gussets were now abandoned altogether as it was considered that the depth of the flange, even if not supported by another plate, would be stiff enough. This also allowed better access to the inside, for painting. Intermittent cross diaphragms were placed across the flange, to maintain its position relative to the main web and avoid distortion by rocking sideways.

The form of girder was widely used in Brunel's work for the Eastern Bengal Railway.

=== Cumberland Basin bridges ===
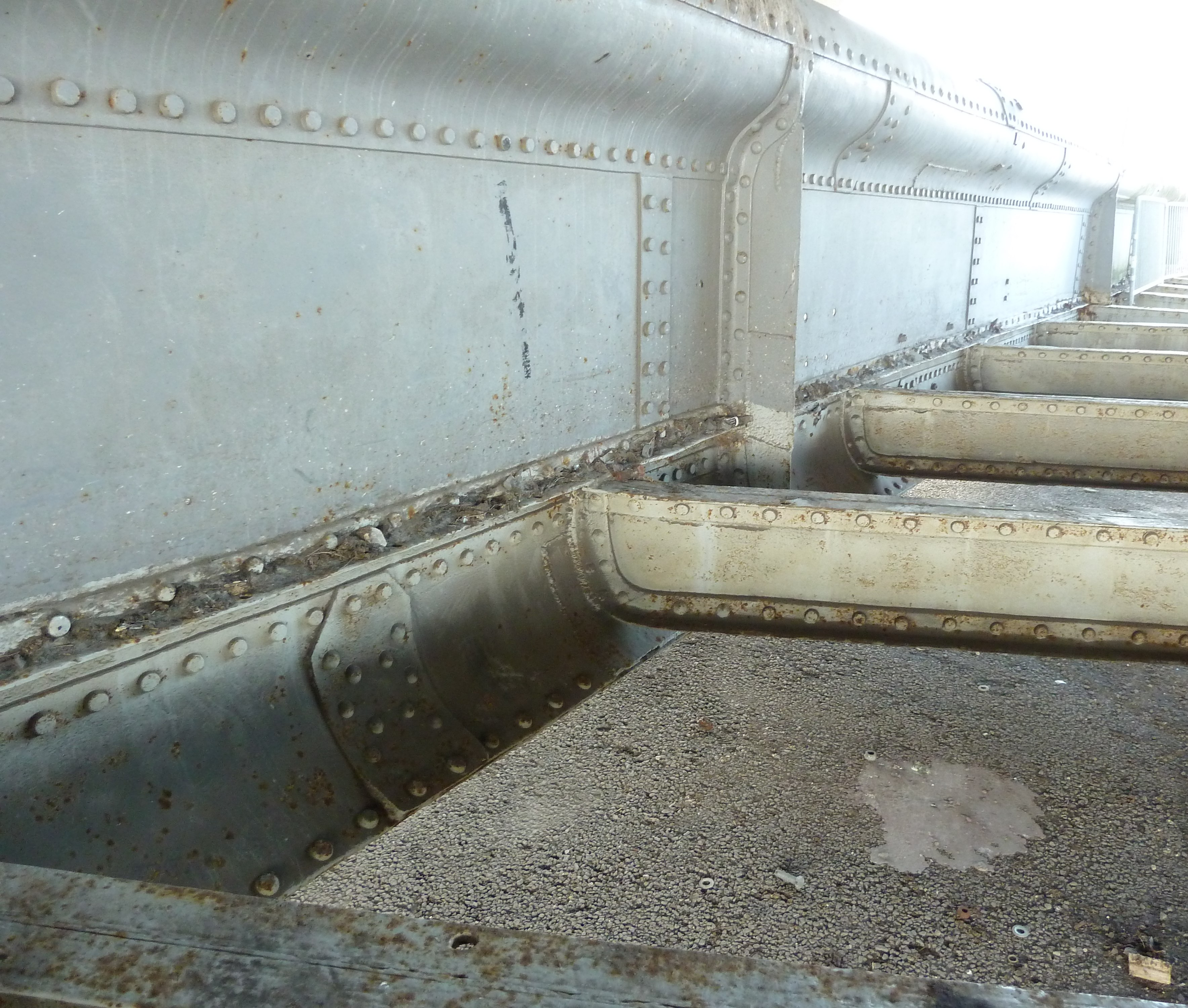
Cumberland Basin bridge girder, showing the upper and lower flanges

When Brunel rebuilt the entrance locks of the Cumberland Basin in Bristol Harbour, between 1848 and 1849, he also constructed a 'swivel bridge' – Brunel's first moving bridge. This was of centre-pivot construction, but were highly asymmetrical, the outboard side being nearly three times longer than the landward, balanced by a large cast-iron counterweight.

As the bridge was for a light roadway and did not have to carry the weight of a railway or train, its girders were of a lightweight construction that simplified manufacture. A full balloon upper flange was used, similar in shape to the South Wales Railway bridges, but the flange sat above the main web of the girder and the web did not span the flange and reach to the top. This simplified construction as it avoided the T-joint, the necessary L-strips and thus several rows of riveting.

The lower flange was of an entirely novel form, being triangular in section, although with concave sides. Again, the main web did not span the flange. All three joints were now simple lap joints with single-row riveting.

Like a number of early Brunel bridges, Brunel's involvement with them was largely forgotten and only recorded in obscure works. At one point they were under serious threat of demolition until their historical significance was re-recognised. A £1 million appeal was launched in 2014 to restore the bridge.

A very similar swivel bridge was built a few years later as the Dock Bridge in Kronstadt, Russia.

=== Windsor Railway Bridge ===
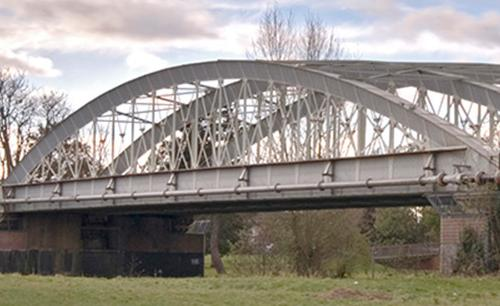
The girders of Windsor Railway Bridge

Windsor Railway Bridge (1849) is a tied-arch or bowstring girder bridge. The span is composed of two girders that form a truss. The upper girder is an arch and carries the weight of the bridge. The lower girder is suspended from this by vertical rods and is not required to support its own weight. The main function of the lower girder is to act as a tie; this counteracts the side-forces of the arch, avoiding the arch's usual side-forces on its foundations. As this is a railway bridge, where suspended deck bridges are a problem owing to swaying of their deck, this girder also has a stiffening function.

Brunel used a form of his balloon flange girder for both girders. The upper arch girder uses the triangulated form of the early experiment, with a flat top plate and without any vertical web below the flange box at all. The lower girder uses the 'open' form of the flange, slightly curved and with no gusset plates. As the lower girder is not carrying its weight, it is not subject to the usual buckling forces.

=== Chepstow Railway Bridge ===
Chepstow Railway Bridge (1852) was a complicated bridge that made the first use of Brunel's truss design to produce a suspension bridge with a wide uninterrupted span at high level above a shipping channel. The west bank of the gorge was shallow and muddy though, so half of the bridge's total span was provided by three 100-foot spans of a girder bridge, carried on cast iron cylindrical piers. These girders (illus) were of a form and size very similar to the original experimental girder.

The landward girders were replaced in 1948 and the main truss, with its girders beneath, in 1962. Portions of the girders survive today.

=== Crathie Bridge ===
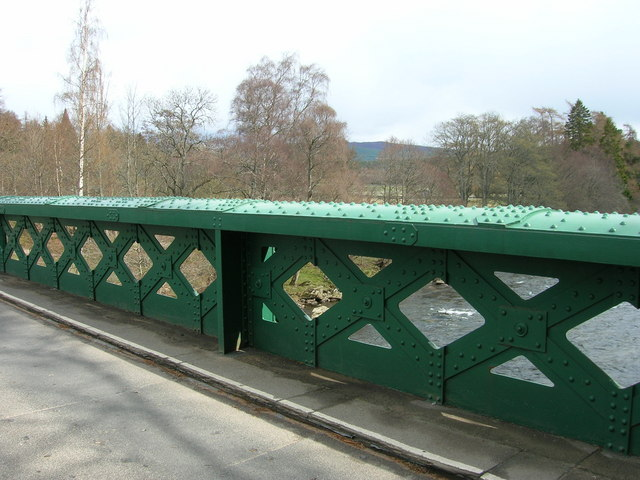
X lattice and upper flange of Crathie Bridge

Crathie Bridge (1854–1857) is a 125-foot single span across the River Dee to the royal Balmoral estate. The bridge had first been drawn with a form of the Brunel truss echoing his Royal Albert Bridge at Saltash. The bridge as constructed though used the C-shaped open form of the upper flange, as used for the Eastern Bengal Railway. As the bridge was only for light road traffic, it was also possible to replace the solid web of the girder above the roadway level with an openwork lattice, making the view from the bridge visually more appealing for its illustrious resident. Despite this, Her Majesty was 'not amused' by the bridge.

=== Devizes 'Fish Bridge' ===
The line of 1857 through Devizes in Wiltshire down Caen Hill was carried over a road on an unusual development of the balloon flange, combining it with a lenticular plate girder. This lenticular fishbelly shape gave its popular name of 'Fish Bridge'. From his work on his truss design, Brunel was already familiar with the advantages of the lenticular form.

The original Fish Bridge was replaced in 1901 with a bowstring truss. The name remained in common use, even after the railway was removed during the Beeching Axe.

== Surviving examples ==
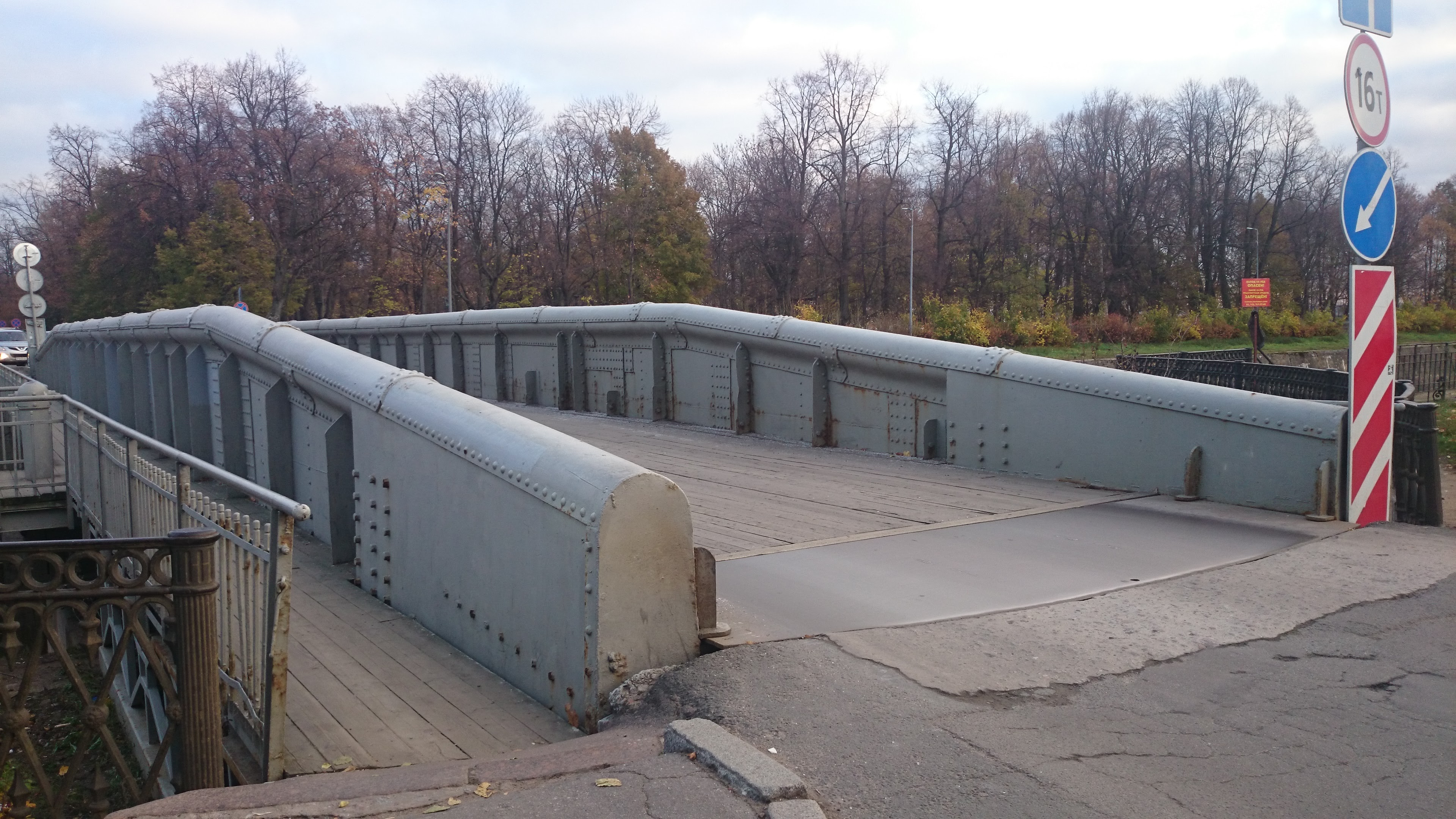
Dock Bridge, Kronstadt, Russia

- Over Junction Bridge, the railway bridge across the Severn at Over. (1848)
- Cumberland Basin, Bristol Harbour (1849) One fixed span has been recently restored for use as a footbridge.
- Windsor Railway Bridge (1849)
- Chepstow railway bridge (1852) Sections of the girders survive at Brunel University, Uxbridge.
- Crathie Bridge (1854–1857) to the royal Balmoral estate.
- Coity Road Bridge, Bridgend (1861)
- Stoodleigh Bridge, Devon. Semi-circular open-bottom top flange, lattice truss girder, c. 1863.
- Peel Street Bridge, Bristol. Semi-circular open-bottom top flange, lattice truss girder, 1878.
- The canal portion of Bishop's Bridge, Paddington, may be Brunel's first use of this technique. It was dismantled and stored in 2004.

== See also ==
- Brunel truss
