= Benton Street Bridge =

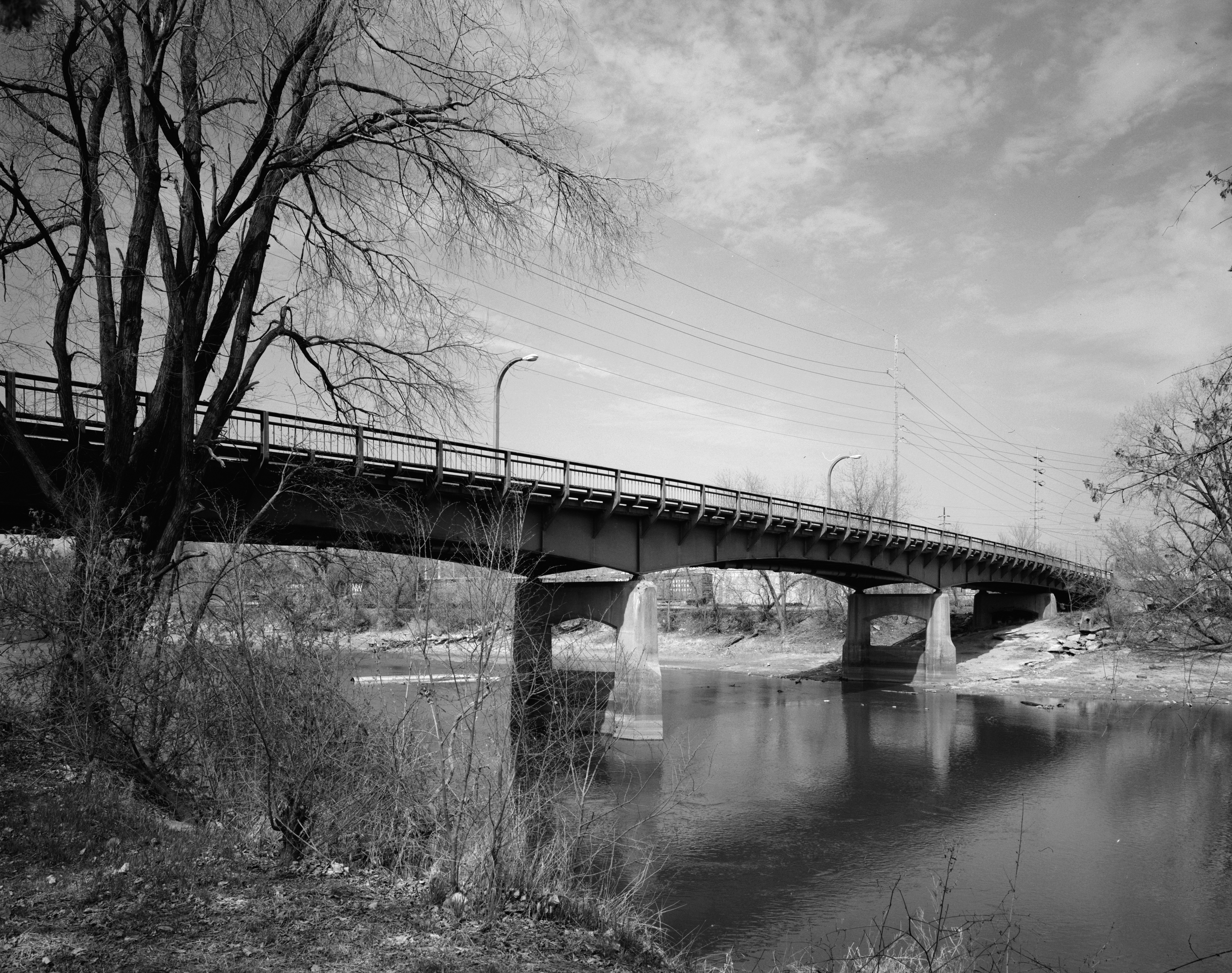
- Benton Street Bridge in Iowa City crossing from the west bank of the Iowa River, looking northeast
- Coordinates: 41°39′02″N 91°32′20″W
- Crosses: Iowa River
- Locale: Iowa City, Iowa

History
- Designer: Edward L. Ashton
- Construction end: 1949
- Closed: 1989 (demolished)

Benton Street Bridge was a historically important bridge designed by Edward L. Ashton. It crossed the Iowa River in Iowa City. In 1989 it was demolished and replaced with a modern highway bridge. A historical marker nearby describes the old bridge.

Ned Ashton was a professor of civil engineering at the University of Iowa from 1943 to 1957 and has been called "the most distinguished bridge engineer in the history of Iowa." He designed several bridges over the Mississippi River, and was a pioneer in the design of welded plate girder bridges.

== See also ==
- List of bridges documented by the Historic American Engineering Record in Iowa
