= Ned Ashton =

Ned Ashton may refer to:

- Ned Ashton (General Hospital), a fictional character in the American daytime drama General Hospital
- Ned Ashton, nickname for American engineer Edward L. Ashton, namesake for the 1947 Ned Ashton House in Iowa

== See also ==
- Edward Ashton (disambiguation)
