= Bishop's Bridge =

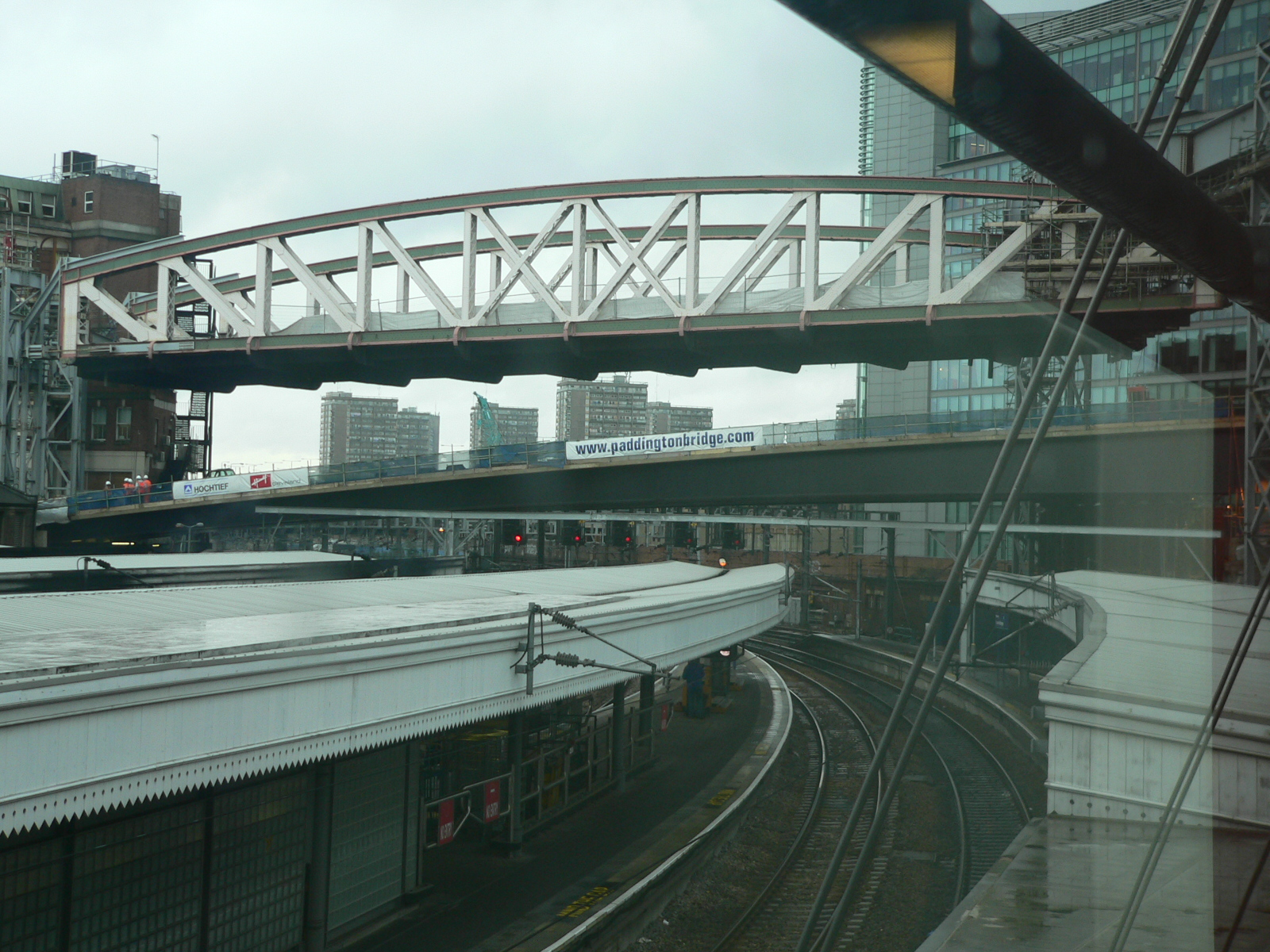
- Both bridges in October 2005 viewed from Paddington station, the original cast-iron bridge has been jacked-up to allow construction of its concrete replacement to proceed below
- Coordinates: 51°31′6.5″N 0°10′46.4″W
- Carries: Bishop's Bridge Road – A4206
- Crosses: Paddington station rail approaches; Paddington Canal
- Locale: Paddington, London
- Preceded by: Westbourne Bridge

Characteristics
- Material: Cast iron (1839–2005); Concrete (2006–)

History
- Construction end: 1839
- Rebuilt: 2006

Bishop's Bridge, sometimes known as Paddington Bridge, is a road bridge in the Paddington district of London which carries Bishop's Bridge Road across the rail approaches to Paddington station and across the adjacent Paddington Arm of the Grand Union Canal. The original Isambard Kingdom Brunel built bridge was replaced in 2006. The name Bishop's Bridge Road comes from the manor of Paddington which was granted to the Bishop of London, Nicholas Ridley, by Edward VI in the mid 16th Century.

== Brunel's first iron bridge ==
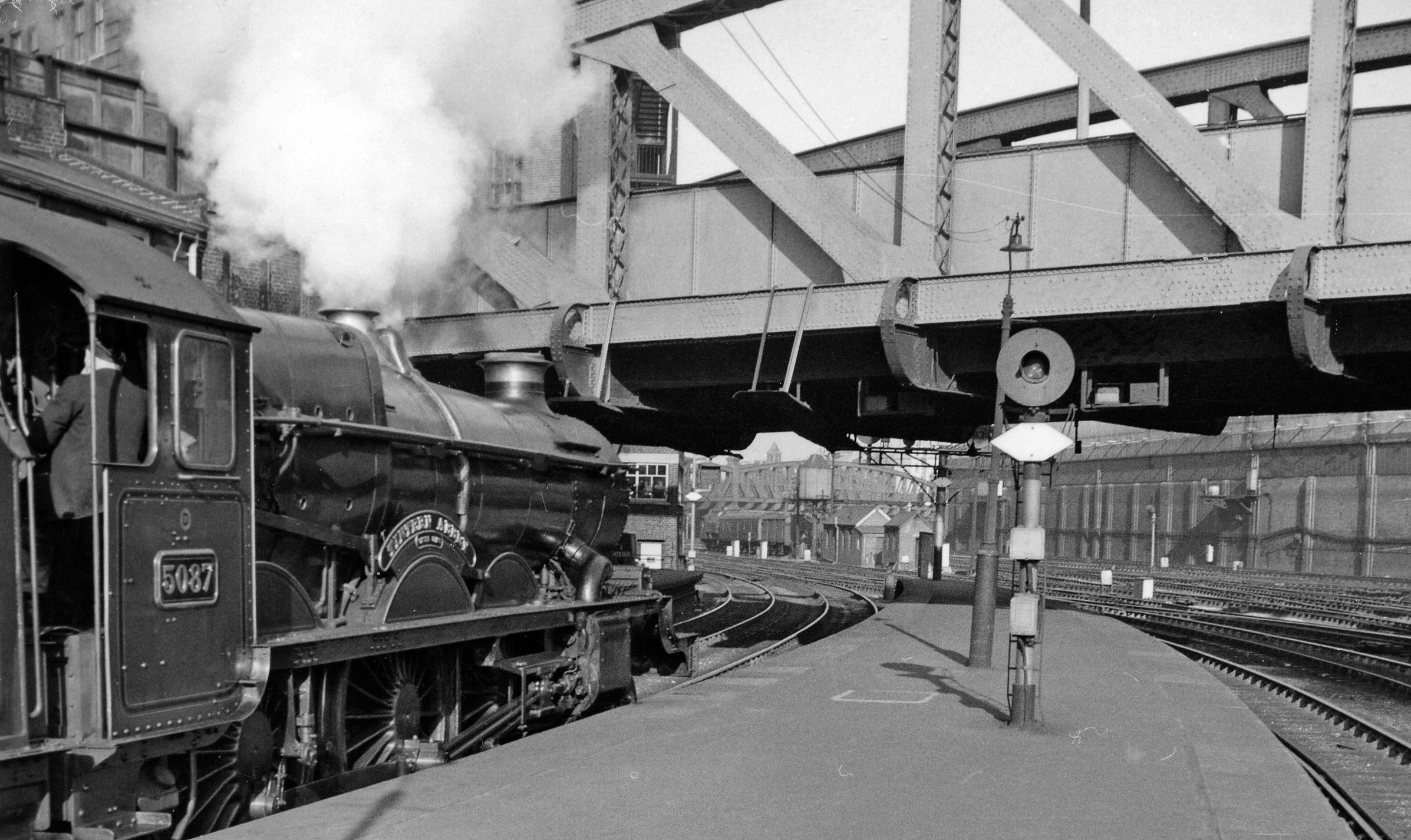
A GWR 4073 Class locomotive waits to depart, adjacent to Brunel's cast-iron bridge (April 1962)

In 2003 while researching a book about the station, Steven Brindle, Inspector of Ancient Monuments for English Heritage (London region), discovered that Isambard Kingdom Brunel was responsible for the original Bishop's Bridge, and that the section he built over the canal was his first iron bridge and had a unique design. The bulb-headed cast iron girders used in this bridge would have an influence on the much longer wrought iron girders he would later develop in his balloon flange pattern.

Unaware that they were intending to replace the bridge, by the time Brindle contacted Westminster City Council, their planning of the replacement project was at an advanced stage, with the main contract due to be signed the following week, and demolition due to take place 10 months later.

Investigations determined that the canal section of Brunel's 1839 bridge had survived, as rebuilding work in 1906 had merely obscured it and caused it to be forgotten. Negotiations between the council and English Heritage followed, and it was agreed that the 1839 iron bridge would be dismantled with a view to future reconstruction. The bulk of the dismantling work took place in April 2004, allowing the bridge replacement work to proceed as planned.

An application for planning permission to reconstruct the original iron bridge 200 yards (180 m) along the canal was submitted in April 2006. However, this has lapsed, and the dismantled bridge remains in storage in the care of Historic England at Fort Cumberland, near Portsmouth.

Construction on the replacement bridge by Hochtief commenced in July 2003 with it opening on 14 June 2006.

== See also ==
- List of bridges in London
