= Chepstow Railway Bridge =

Bridge spanning the River Wye between England and Wales

Coordinates: 51°38′37.10″N 2°40′1.00″W

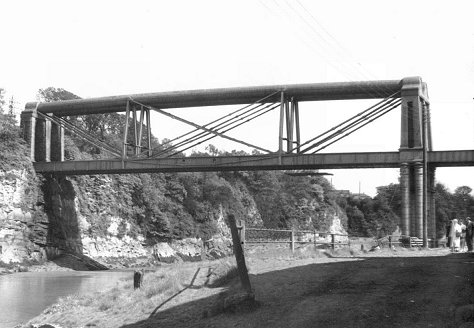
Brunel's original railway bridge over the Wye at Chepstow, before its 1962 replacement.

Chepstow Railway Bridge is a former railway bridge built to a design by Isambard Kingdom Brunel in 1852. Known as the "Great Tubular Bridge", it spanned the River Wye at Chepstow, Wales, and is considered one of Brunel's major achievements. It was economical in its use of materials, and would prove to be the design prototype for Brunel's 1854 Royal Albert Bridge at Saltash in Cornwall. Although the superstructure has since been replaced, Brunel's tubular iron piers continue to support the bridge. It is a Grade II listed structure, and spans the border between Wales and England.

== Background ==
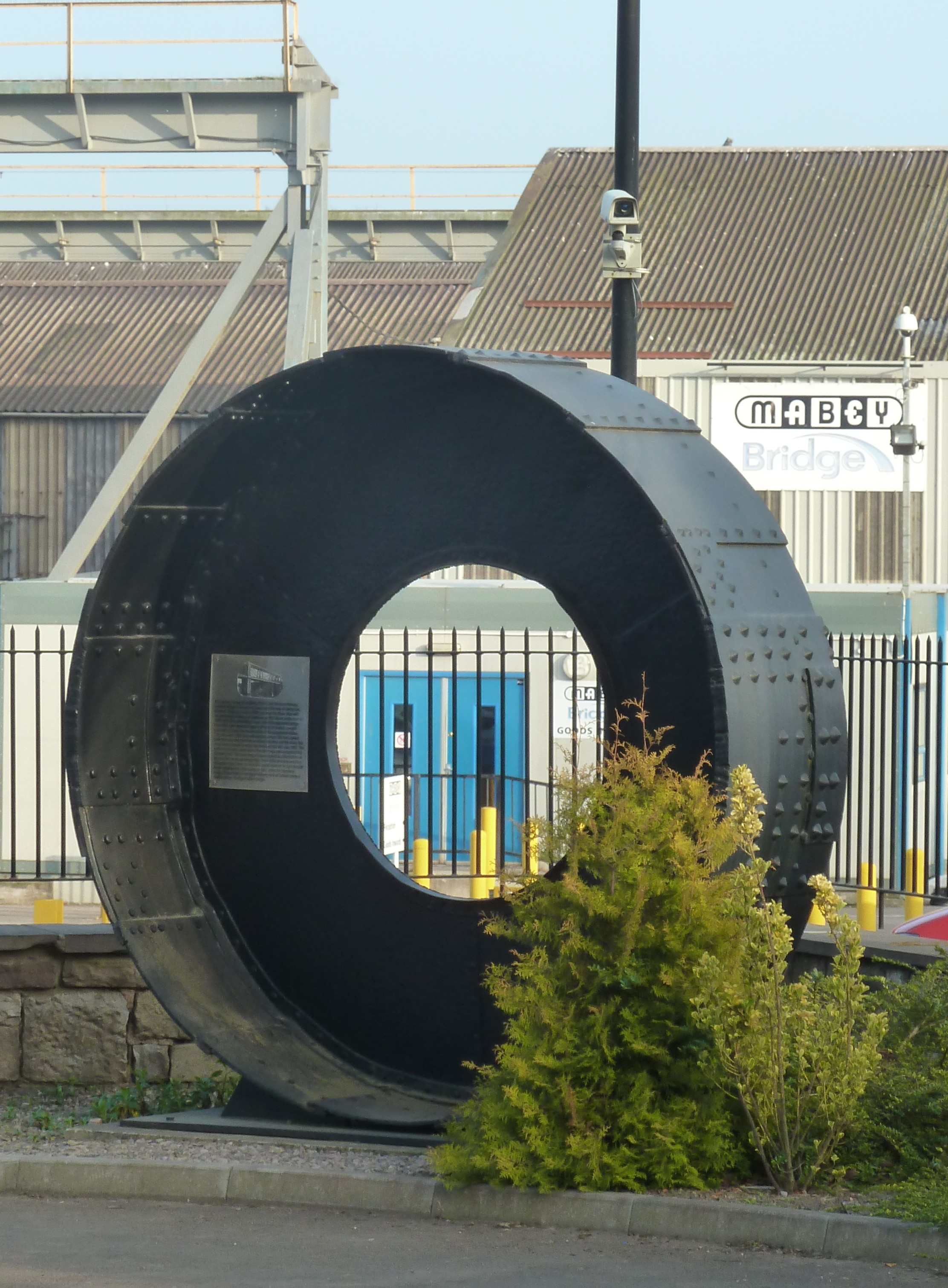
Surviving section of one of the horizontal girders, preserved outside the offices of the adjacent Mabey Bridge works.

Brunel had to take the two tracks of the South Wales Railway across the River Wye. The Admiralty had insisted on a 300-foot (91 m) clear span over the river, with the bridge a minimum of 50 feet (15 m) above high tide. The span would have to be self-supporting, since although the Gloucestershire side of the river consists of a limestone cliff, the Monmouthshire side is low-lying sedimentary deposit subject to regular flooding. Thus on that side, there was nowhere for an abutment capable of either resisting the outward push of an arch bridge, or the inward pull of a conventional suspension bridge. In any case, neither could be used: an arch bridge would not have met the height and width restrictions imposed by the Admiralty, and suspension bridges were notoriously unfit for carrying railway trains. The concentrated weight caused the chains to deflect, allowing the bridge-deck to ride dangerously up and down. A self-supporting truss bridge was the only option.

Robert Stephenson had bridged the River Conwy (1848) and the Menai Straits (1850) with spans of 400 and 450 feet (140 m) respectively, using large box-girder sections of riveted wrought iron. Conwy-like box-girders would have been very expensive to use at Chepstow as well as being heavy (problematic, since the spans had to be lifted much higher than at Conwy). Brunel, characteristically, sought a radical solution. He had already built a bowstring or tied arch bridge at Windsor (1849) consisting of three triangular cross-section cellular arch ribs "strung" by wrought iron deck girders supported by vertical hangers from the arches. This was the same year as Stephenson's tied arch High Level Bridge at Newcastle upon Tyne, which was supposed to have influenced Brunel at Chepstow. However, Brunel's solution for the latter was to make a leap forward, based, nevertheless, on sound engineering principles and a variation of the tied-arch theme.

The experiments of William Fairbairn, and the mathematical analysis of Eaton Hodgkinson had shown by a series of experiments that an enclosed box girder, made of riveted wrought iron, combined relative lightness with great strength. The tubular wrought-iron girder – be the cross-section rectangular, triangular or circular – formed a most efficient truss component. If the cross-section was large enough it could be self-supporting. It was Fairbairn's experiments that led to the design of the Menai and Conwy bridges. Stephenson had originally proposed using a box-girder section suspended from chains. The box section would, he argued, be stiff enough to overcome the conventional problems of the bridge-decks of suspension bridges. In the event, Fairbairn showed that a properly constructed box girder would be strong enough so that the chains could be dispensed with. Nevertheless, the decision (not to use chains) was taken late in the project, so the Britannia bridge support towers were still built with holes for the chains. Stephenson's box-girders were a great innovation, and using steel or pre-stressed concrete instead of wrought iron, box-girder construction is the standard today for large bridges. But as Berridge has observed, "Brunel was never one to follow fashion for fashion's sake... (at Chepstow)... Here was the real engineer at work, designing the bridge to suit the site and the best way of getting it into position".

The bridge filled a gap in the main rail line between Gloucester and Swansea. The line between Chepstow railway station and Swansea was opened on 18 June 1850, and on 19 September 1851 the line was completed between Gloucester and a station east of the river, known as Chepstow East. Until the bridge was completed and opened, through passengers were carried from one station to the other by coach, using the 1816 road bridge across the River Wye. The railway bridge was opened to public use for the first time on 19 July 1852; Chepstow East station closed at the same time as redundant. Originally there was only one line of railway over the bridge; a second was brought into use on 18 April 1853. The new railway line, and bridge, had the effect of reducing the journey time between London and Swansea from 15 hours, by rail, road and ferry, to 5 hours by rail.

== The Chepstow Bridge design ==
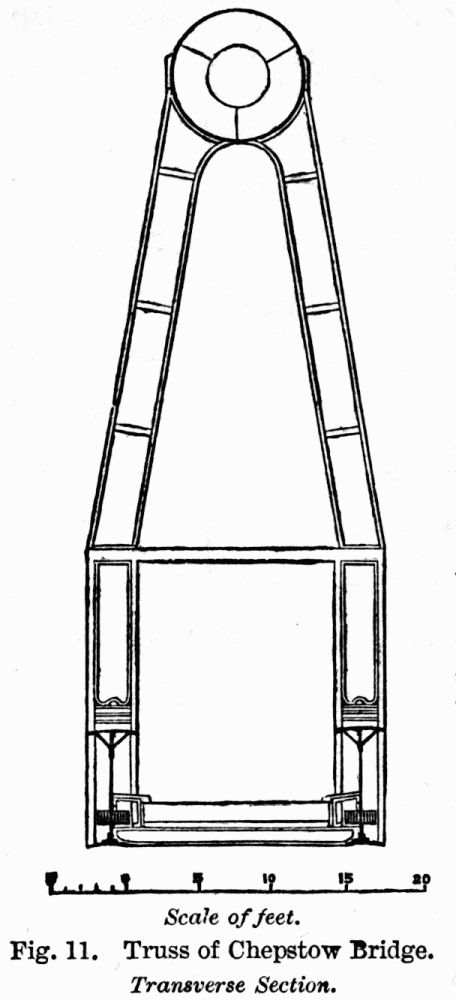
Section of truss supporting the tubular girder

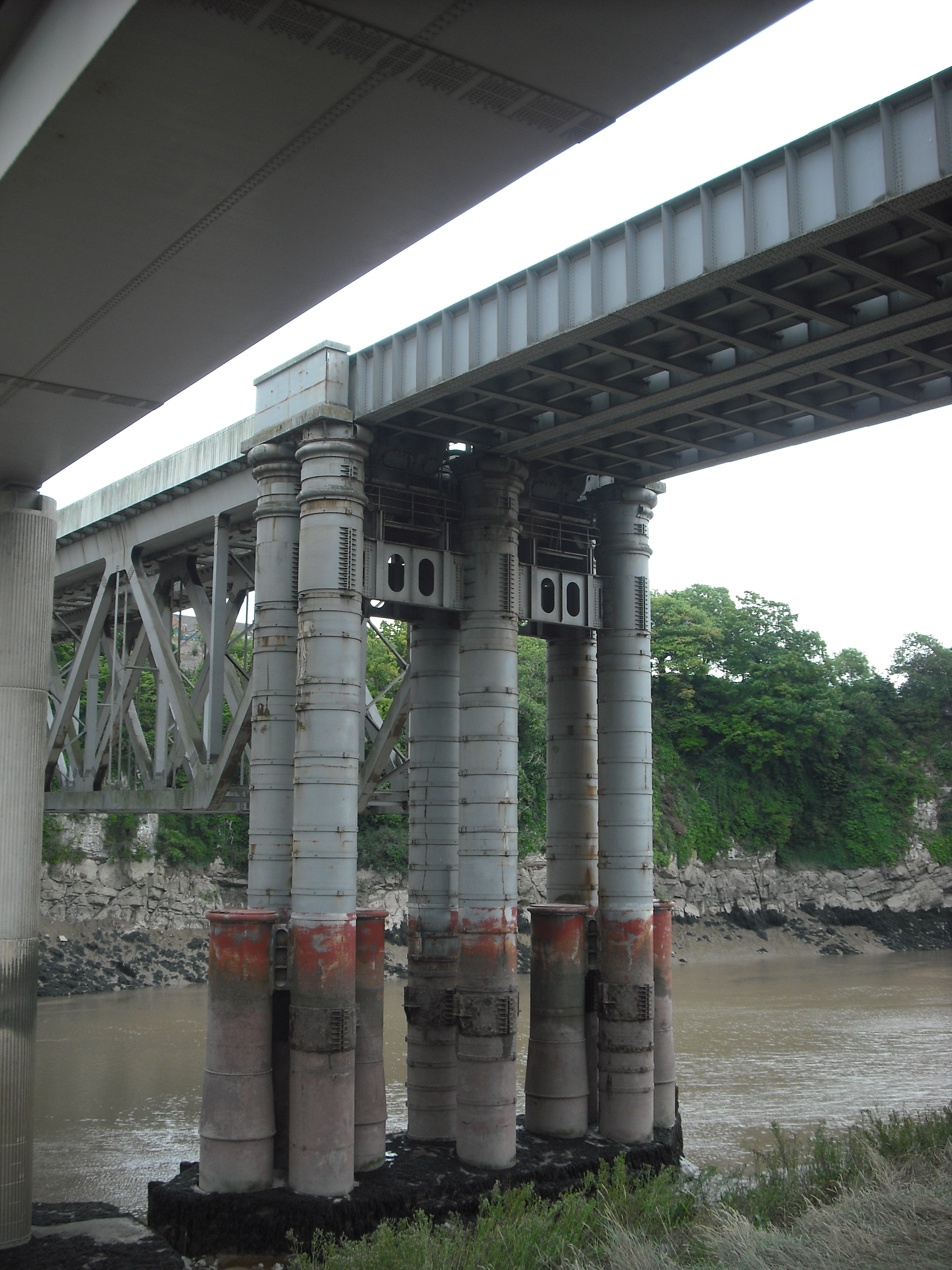
Brunel's original cast iron piers still support the modern underhung truss railway bridge.

Brunel recognised that a circular cross-section tubular girder – a shallow "bow", excellent in compression and tension – could be strung by suspension chains to form a stiff, self-supporting structure very much lighter (thus less expensive) than a Stephenson-type box girder. Instead of hanging the chains from towers and suspending the bridge deck from them, Brunel used the chains to stress and slightly bow the tubes, which were braced against the chains using struts. The bridge deck was rigid, because it was effectively clamped against the tubes by the chains. Brunel solved the problem in his own way, and for more than 100 years, the Chepstow and subsequently the Royal Albert Bridge were the only suspension bridges on the British railway system.

Though rivals, Brunel and Stephenson supported one another professionally. When Stephenson was under pressure during the enquiry following the collapse of his cast-iron girder bridge over the River Dee, which resulted in several deaths, Brunel refused to condemn the use of cast-iron girders when cross-examined as an expert witness. He was also present to provide Stephenson moral support when the great Britannia box-girders were floated across the river prior to being jacked up to their final positions. So when it came to the revolutionary design at Chepstow, The Times of 24 February 1852, reported that “Mr Stephenson, the eminent engineer, has examined the (great railway) bridge (at Chepstow) and concurred in the plan adopted by Mr Brunel...”.

The bridge was a triumph of the application of a radical design to a specific problem using available materials. The total cost (£77,000) was half what the Conwy bridge cost (£145,190 18s 0d) — admittedly with a main span of only 300 feet (91 m) compared with Conwy's 400 feet (120 m), but there were no deep-water foundations needed at Conwy, and at Chepstow, the cost included a further 300 feet (91 m) of land spans.

With regard to the appearance of the bridge, the Illustrated London News stated that "the peculiarity of the site did not permit any display of 'Art' – that is, of architectural embellishment; indeed, a pure taste rejects any attempt to decorate a large mechanical work with sham columns, pilasters, and small ornamental details."

The bridge was constructed on site for Brunel by Edward Finch of Liverpool as partner in the firm Finch & Willey. After it was completed, Finch remained in Chepstow, and developed a major engineering and, later, shipbuilding business on the site, beside the river. The adjoining site, later occupied by the engineering firm Mabey Bridge (formerly Fairfield Mabey), was engaged in prefabricated bridge construction, and in 1987 was responsible for building the A48 road bridge which now runs alongside the railway bridge. Mabey left the site in 2015, and as at 2020 it is being redeveloped for housing.

== Legacy ==
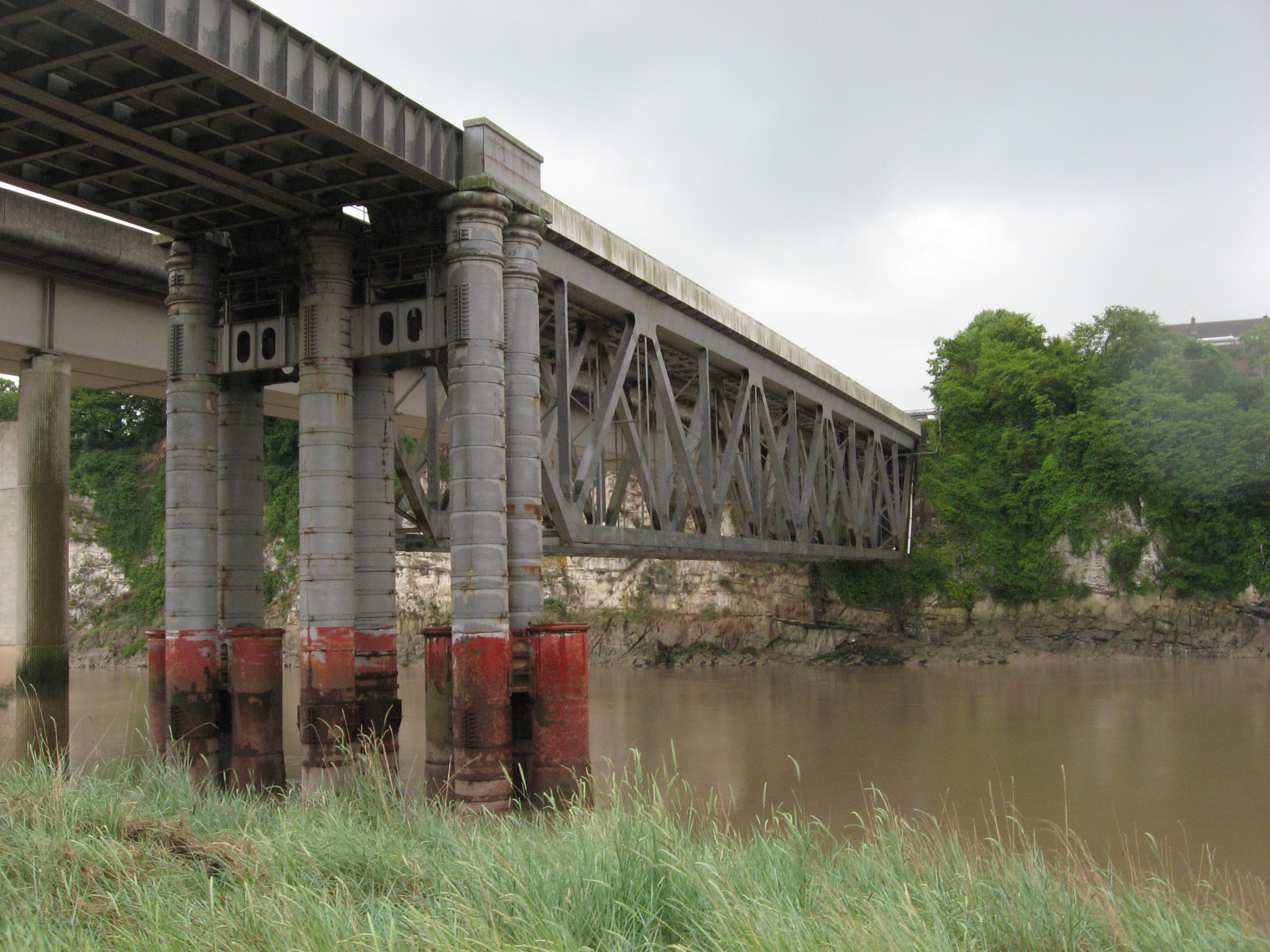
Chepstow Railway Bridge in 2011

However, even Brunel was not infallible, and his foresight in allowing for slight movement of the suspension chains against supports on the bridge-deck to relieve stress, led to a weakening of the structure. In the 1950s, the speed of trains using the bridge was restricted to 15 miles per hour (24 km/h), because some of the girders had become distorted. In 1962, a new structure to support the bridge beneath the main span was put in place.

Of the bridges mentioned here, the Windsor and Conwy bridges are still standing and in use, although the Conwy spans have been shortened using intermediate supports; the Britannia bridge had to be replaced in 1970 after a fire. Nevertheless, Brunel's Chepstow bridge was a watershed, leading to a final refinement of the design in his 1859 Royal Albert Bridge over the River Tamar at Saltash, which continues to carry the former Cornwall Railway main line into Cornwall.

== See also ==
- List of crossings of the River Wye
- List of bridges in Wales
- List of railway bridges and viaducts in the United Kingdom
