= Crathie, Aberdeenshire =

Village in Aberdeenshire, Scotland

Coordinates: 57°02′25″N 3°12′55″W

Crathie: Scottish Gaelic: Craichidh
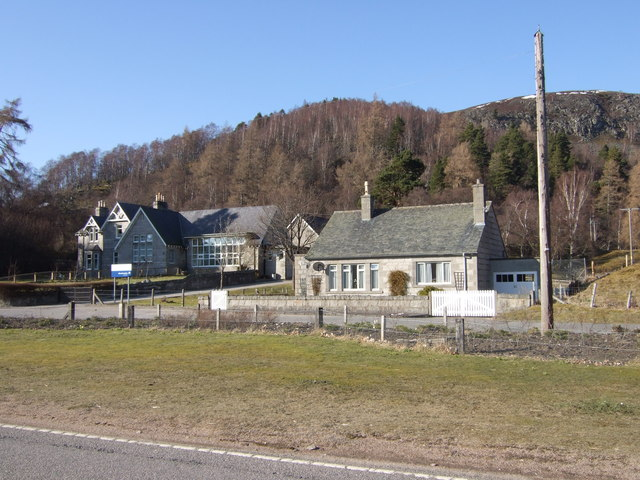
- Crathie School in 2007

- Location within Aberdeenshire
- OS grid reference: NO266946
- Council area: Aberdeenshire
- Lieutenancy area: Aberdeenshire
- Country: Scotland
- Sovereign state: United Kingdom
- Post town: BALLATER
- Postcode district: AB35
- Police: Scotland
- Fire: Scottish
- Ambulance: Scottish
- UK Parliament: West Aberdeenshire and Kincardine
- Scottish Parliament: Aberdeenshire West

Crathie (Scottish Gaelic: Craichidh) is a village in Aberdeenshire, Scotland. It stands on the north bank of the River Dee.

Abergeldie Castle is 1 mile (2 kilometres) away. It was built around 1550 and had 19th century additions. It was garrisoned by General Hugh Mackay in 1689.

Crathie is 7 miles (11 kilometres) west of Ballater, but only 1/2 mile (800 metres) east of Balmoral Castle. It is best known for its association with the royal inhabitants of the castle, particularly for their patronage of Crathie Kirk, the parish church. Traditionally many of the estate's workers lived at Crathie. Crathie Bridge is one of the more obscure of Brunel's iron bridges, demonstrating his balloon flange girder.

The hills to the south contain a number of memorial cairns, commemorating Prince Albert and some of his children. John Brown, a favoured acquaintance of Queen Victoria's is also buried here.

The Royal Lochnagar distillery stands on the southern bank of the Dee east of the village. The only producer of a Deeside single malt, it is fed by natural springs rising on the slopes of Lochnagar, a neighbouring Munro.

In local government Ballater and Crathie share a combined Community council of 12 members. In the UK House of Commons it is represented by the county constituency of West Aberdeenshire and Kincardine, and in the Scottish Parliament it is represented by the county constituency of Aberdeenshire West.

== See also ==
- Aberdeenshire Cricket Association
