= Edward Ashton (colonel) =

Edward Ashton (died 1658) was a royalist colonel in the English army who was executed for being in a plot against Oliver Cromwell.

Ashton was deeply implicated in the plot against the Lord Protector set on foot by Ormond and other agents of Charles II in 1658, and for complicity in which Sir Henry Slingsby and John Hewet were executed. Ashton's part was to set fire to the city, throw open all the prisons, and seize all moneys and plate at the goldsmiths', but it was to be 'death for any to touch any man's private goods.'

He was tried with six of his fellow-conspirators before the commissioners of the High Court of Justice, was found guilty, and on 7 July 1658 was hanged, drawn, and quartered in 'Tower Street, London, over against Mark Lane end.' Four of his fellow conspirators suffered similar penalties in different parts of the city.
