= Edward Gaskin =

Panamanian trade unionist

Edward A. Gaskin (3 February 1918, Red Tank, Panama – August 10, 2001) was a former educator and labor leader. He fought for retirement benefits, against the low wages and the racial discrimination of the black laborers of Panama and the West Indies in the Canal Zone. Gaskin took his campaign to the President of Panama and successfully lobbied for highly beneficial clauses (retirement benefits and equal pay for equal work) in the Remon–Eisenhower Treaty of 1955.

Gaskin was also the principal of the La Boca School. In 1946 he founded the Teachers' Union.

In 1985 he received the Silver Panama Canal Honorary Public Service Award from President Ronald Reagan, in recognition of his struggle and his service to the Isthmian Community.
