= Royal Albert Bridge =

Railway bridge spanning the River Tamar in South West England

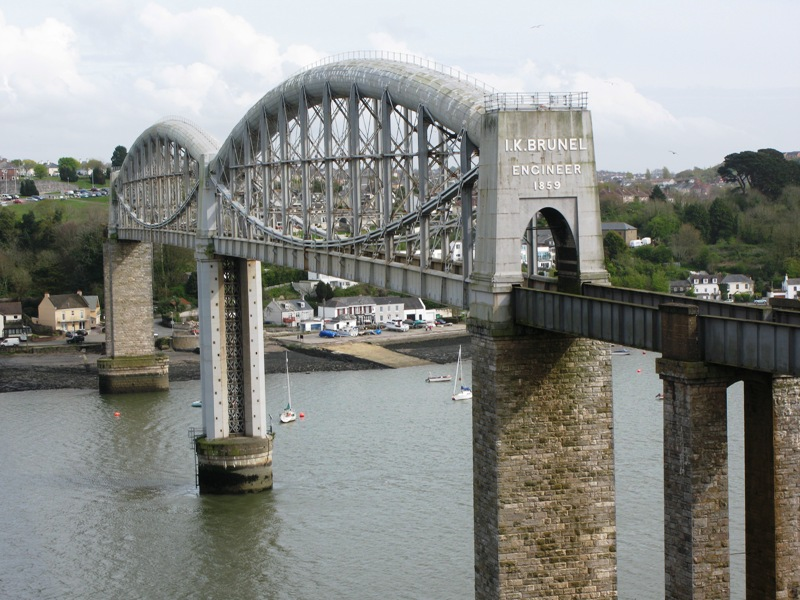
- Coordinates: 50°24′27″N 4°12′12″W
- Carries: Railway
- Crosses: River Tamar
- Locale: Between Plymouth and Saltash, England
- Maintained by: Network Rail

Characteristics
- Design: Lenticular truss
- Material: Iron
- Total length: 2,187.5 feet (666.8 m)
- Width: 16.83 feet (5.13 m) (inside piers)
- Height: 172 feet (52.4 m)
- Longest span: 2 of 455 feet (138.7 m)
- No. of spans: 19
- Piers in water: 3
- Clearance below: 100 feet (30 m)

History
- Designer: Isambard Kingdom Brunel
- Construction start: May 1854
- Construction end: April 1859
- Opened: 2 May 1859

Statistics

Listed Building – Grade I
- Official name: Royal Albert Bridge and seventeen approach spans
- Designated: 17 January 1952
- Reference no.: 1159292

Location
- Interactive map of Royal Albert Bridge

The Royal Albert Bridge is a railway bridge which spans the River Tamar in England, between Plymouth, Devon and Saltash, Cornwall. Its unique design consists of two 455-foot (138.7 m) lenticular iron trusses 100 feet (30.5 m) above the water and conventional plate-girder approach spans. Its total length is 2,187.5 feet (666.8 m). It carries the Cornish Main Line railway in and out of Cornwall and is adjacent to the Tamar Bridge, which opened in 1961 to carry the A38 road.

The Royal Albert Bridge was designed by Isambard Kingdom Brunel. Surveying started in 1848 and construction commenced in 1854. The first main span was positioned in 1857 and the completed bridge was opened by Prince Albert on 2 May 1859. Brunel died later that year and his name was then placed above the portals at either end of the bridge as a memorial. During the 20th century, the approach spans were replaced, and the main spans strengthened. It has attracted sightseers since its construction, appearing in many paintings, photographs, guidebooks, postage stamps and on the UK's £2 coin. Anniversary celebrations took place in 1959 and 2009.

== Cornwall Railway ==
Two rival schemes for a railway to Falmouth, Cornwall, were proposed in the 1830s. The 'central' scheme was a route from Exeter around the north of Dartmoor, an easy route to construct but with little intermediate traffic. The other, the 'coastal' scheme, was a line with many engineering difficulties but which could serve the important naval town of Devonport and the industrial area around St Austell. The central scheme was backed by the London and South Western Railway while the coastal scheme was promoted by the Cornwall Railway and backed by the Great Western Railway which wanted it to join up with the South Devon Railway at Devonport. The Cornwall Railway applied for an Act of Parliament in 1845 but it was rejected, in part because of William Moorsom's plan to carry trains across the water of the Hamoaze on the Devonport-to-Torpoint Ferry. Following this Isambard Kingdom Brunel took over as engineer and proposed to cross the water higher upstream using a bridge at Saltash instead. The Act enabling this scheme was passed on 3 August 1846.

== Design ==
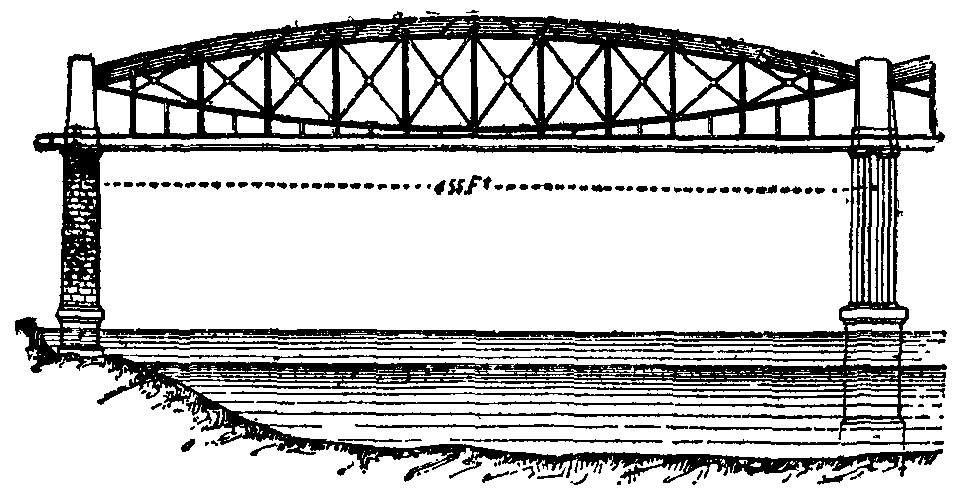
A drawing of one span and its piers

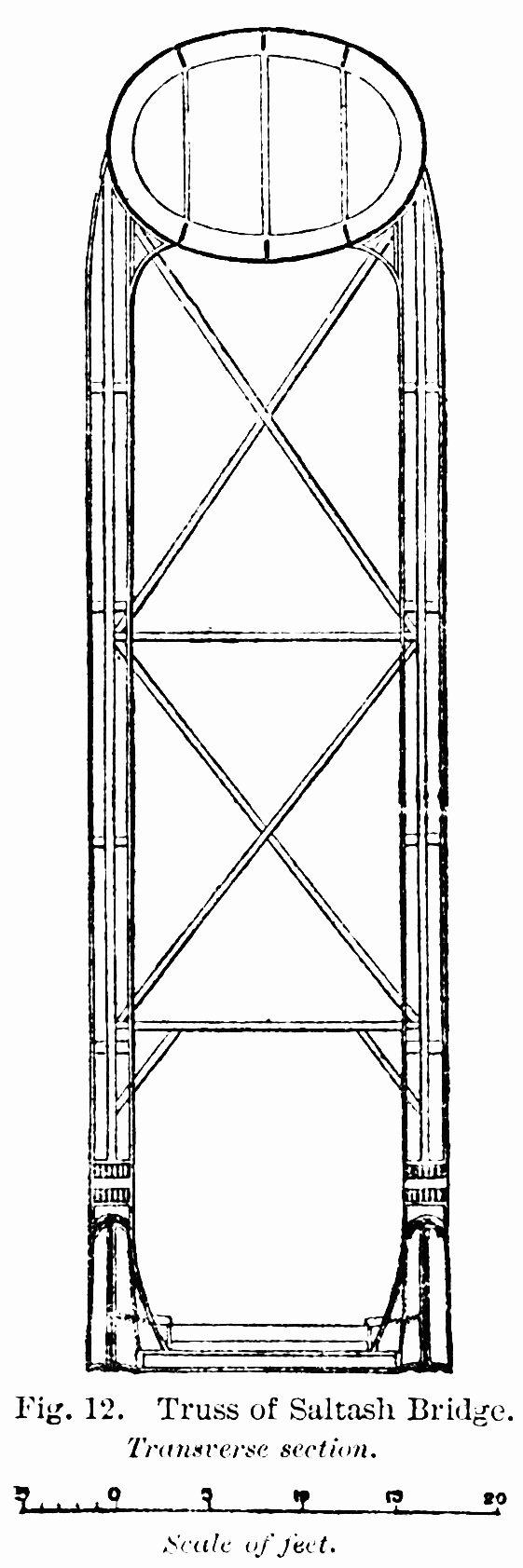
Section of a truss between the tube and the deck

The structure was the third in a series of three large wrought iron bridges built in the middle of the 19th century. It was influenced by the preceding two, both of which had been designed by Robert Stephenson. The two central sections of Brunel's bridge are novel adaptations of the design Stephenson employed for the High Level Bridge across the River Tyne in Newcastle Upon Tyne in 1849. Brunel was present when Stephenson raised the girders of his Britannia Bridge across the Menai Strait in the same year. From 1849 to 1853 Brunel was erecting an iron bridge of his own; the Chepstow Railway Bridge carried the South Wales Railway across the River Wye and featured a main truss of 300 feet (91 m) with a curving tubular main member and three conventional plate-girder approach spans of 100 feet (30 m), a similar solution to that adopted for crossing the River Tamar at Saltash.

The river is about 1,100 feet (340 m) wide at Saltash. Brunel's first thoughts had been to cross this on a double track timber viaduct with a central span of 255 feet (78 m) and six approach spans of 105 feet (32 m) with 80 feet (24 m) clearance above the water. This was rejected by the Admiralty, who had statutory responsibility for navigable waters, so Brunel produced a revised design to give 100 feet (30 m) clearance, with two spans of 300 feet (91 m) and two of 200 feet (61 m). The Admiralty again rejected this plan, stipulating that there should not be more than one pier in the navigable part of the river.

Brunel now abandoned plans for a double track timber structure and instead proposed a single track wrought iron design consisting of a single 850-foot (259.1 m) span. As the cost of this structure would have been around £500,000 at 1846 prices (equivalent to £50,400,000 in 2025), he amended the design to one of two main spans of 455 feet (138.7 m) with 100 feet (30.5 m) clearance above mean high spring tide; this was approved by the Admiralty and the directors of the Cornwall Railway.

The two spans are lenticular trusses with the top chord of each truss comprising a heavy tubular arch in compression, which tend to expand in length under load, while the bottom chord comprises a pair of chains, which tend to contract in length under load. By design, these two effects cancel so that there is no net change in length under load. This in turn enables each of the trusses to be supported with no horizontal thrust exerted on the piers, which is crucial in view of the curved track on either side. Between these two chords are supporting cross-bracing members and suspension standards which hang beneath the bottom chord to carry the railway deck which is a continuous plate beam. There are also 17 shorter and more conventional plate-girder approach spans on the shore. On the Cornish side there are ten which measure (from Saltash station towards the river): 67.5 feet (20.6 m), five of 69.5 feet (21.2 m), 72.5 feet (22.1 m), 78.0 feet (23.8 m), 83.5 feet (25.5 m), 93.0 feet (28.3 m), and seven on the Devon side (from the river towards St Budeaux): 93.0 feet (28.3 m), 83.5 feet (25.5 m), 78.0 feet (23.8 m), 72.5 feet (22.1 m) and three of 69.5 feet (21.2 m). This gives a total length for the nineteen spans of 2,187.5 feet (666.8 m).

== History ==
=== 1848-1859: Construction ===
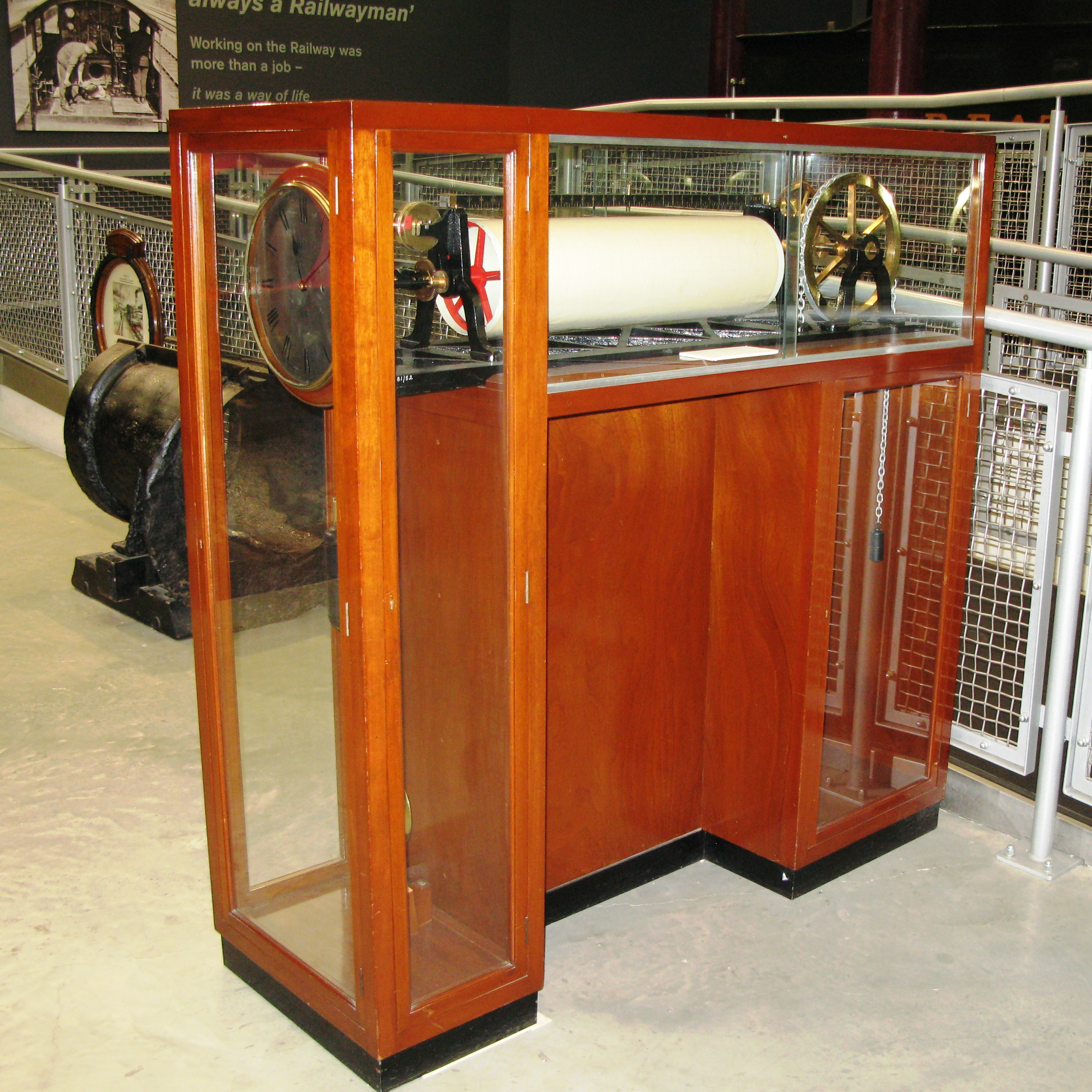
A tide recorder designed by Brunel as part of his survey

The first work was to properly survey the river bed. On 26 April 1848 a 6-foot (1.8 m) iron cylinder 85 feet (25.9 m) tall was launched into the Tamar. From the bottom of this the bed of the river could be examined to identify its nature and the location of solid foundations. The Cornwall Railway at this time was finding it difficult to raise funds and so most operations were suspended that summer, but a small fund was allowed for Brunel to continue the survey. The cylinder was positioned at 35 different places and a total of 175 borings made.

In 1853 the tenders for the bridge were considered by the Cornwall Railway Board, and it was decided to let the work to Charles John Mare, a shipbuilder from Blackwall who had built the ironwork for the Britannia Bridge. The fee he sought for building the Saltash Bridge was £162,000, but on 21 September 1855 while constructing the first of the two trusses he filed for bankruptcy. Brunel proposed that the company should complete this first truss itself by its own direct labour, to which the company agreed. A contract for the remainder of the building was awarded to Messrs Hudson and Male.

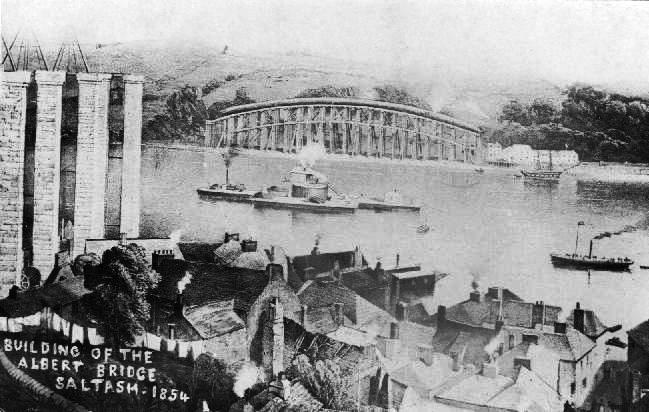
The first span and centre pier under construction in 1854, seen from Saltash

Mare's first task had been to establish an erecting yard on the Devon shore with a jetty and workshops. He then proceeded to construct a 37-foot (11.3 m) iron cylinder 90 feet (27.4 m) tall which was to form the work base for the construction of the central pier. This was launched in May 1854 and moored in the centre of the river between four pontoons. The bottom had been shaped to follow the rock surveyed in 1848. Once it was settled on the river bed the water was pumped out, the mud within it excavated, and a solid masonry pier built up clear of the water. This was completed in November 1856.

The landward piers on the Cornish side of the river were completed in 1854 and the girders for these spans were hoisted up to their correct positions. Next to be built was the main truss for the Cornwall side of the river. The lower ties of the trusses formed of chains made from 20 feet (6.1 m) links. Many were obtained from the suspended works for Brunel's Clifton Suspension Bridge and others rolled new for Saltash. The Cornwall span was floated into position on 1 September 1857 and jacked up to full height in 3-foot (0.9 m) stages as the piers were built up beneath it, the central pier using cast iron octagonal columns; the landward one using ordinary masonry.

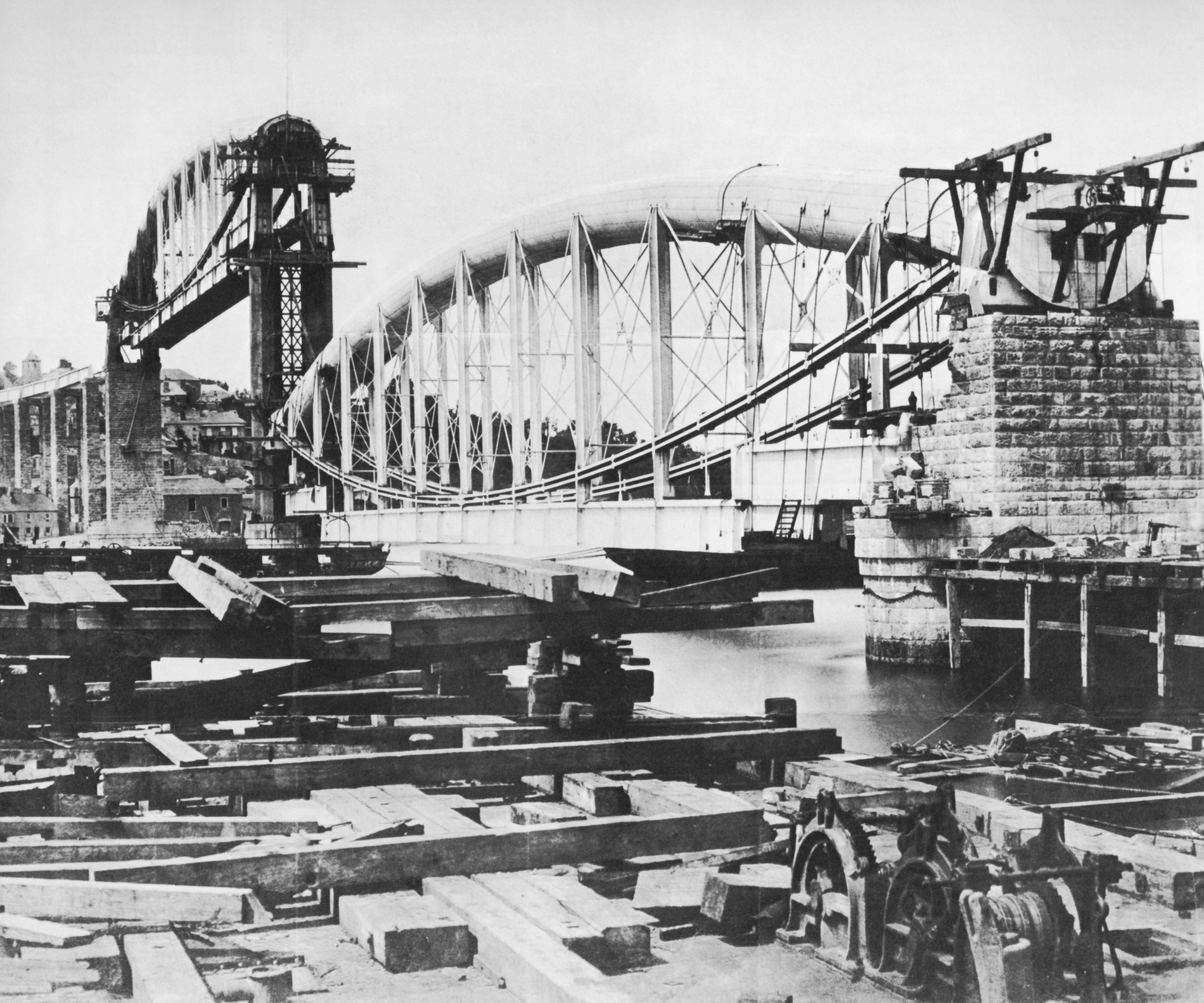
The second span soon after it was floated onto the piers and had been jacked up the first 12 feet (3.7 m) towards its final position

With the yard now cleared of the first truss, work could start on the main Devon span. This was similarly floated into position on 10 July 1858 and then raised in a similar manner. It was in its final position by 28 December 1858. After this had been removed, part of the yard had to be cleared to allow the construction of the final landward pier and then the Devon approach spans could be raised up to their final position. The work was sufficiently advanced that directors were able to make an inspection by train on 11 April 1859.

The Cornwall span had been tested before it was launched. The two ends were supported on substantial timber piers and the remaining scaffolding removed. Static loads of 1.25 and 2.25 long tons per foot (4.2 and 7.5 t/m) were placed on the deck, the deflections measured and any permanent change measured once the load was removed. Now that it was completed, the bridge had its statutory inspection and tests by Colonel Yolland on behalf of the Board of Trade on 20 April 1859. He ran a heavy train over the bridge and measured deflections in the main trusses of 1.14 inches (29 mm) in the Devon truss, and 1.20 inches (30 mm) in the Cornwall one. Overall he described it as 'highly satisfactory'.

=== 1859: Opening day ===
Prince Albert had agreed to the bridge being named after him as early as 1853. He was invited to perform the opening ceremony, and on 2 May 1859 he travelled from Windsor on the Royal Train. Several thousand spectators attended that day, although guests from Cornwall were late for the ceremony as their train broke down at Liskeard. Illness prevented the attendance of Brunel who was instead represented by his chief assistant Robert Brereton. Public services commenced on 4 May 1859.

=== 1859-present ===
After Brunel's premature death on 15 September 1859 the directors of the Cornwall Railway Company decided to make the bridge a memorial to him by adding the words I.K. BRUNEL, ENGINEER, 1859 in large metal letters on either end of the bridge. In 1921, new access platforms were added that obscured the lettering but in 2006 Network Rail relocated the platforms, allowing the name to be clearly seen again. The walkways had previously been temporarily removed in 1959 and the bridge floodlit during its centenary year.

Over the weekend of 21–22 May 1892 the track gauge on the bridge was converted from 7 ft 1/4 in (2,140 mm) to 4 ft 8 1/2 in (1,435 mm) during the final conversion of the whole Great Western Railway.

401 new cross-girders were fitted in 1905 to allow heavier locomotives to pass over. In 1908 the two spans nearest Saltash station were replaced with wider ones to accommodate a new track layout. The remaining approach spans were replaced on both sides of the river during 1928 and 1929. During the 1930s new cross-bracing and diagonal sway-bracing were added between the vertical standards to further strengthen the bridge and keep the suspension chains hanging in the correct shape.

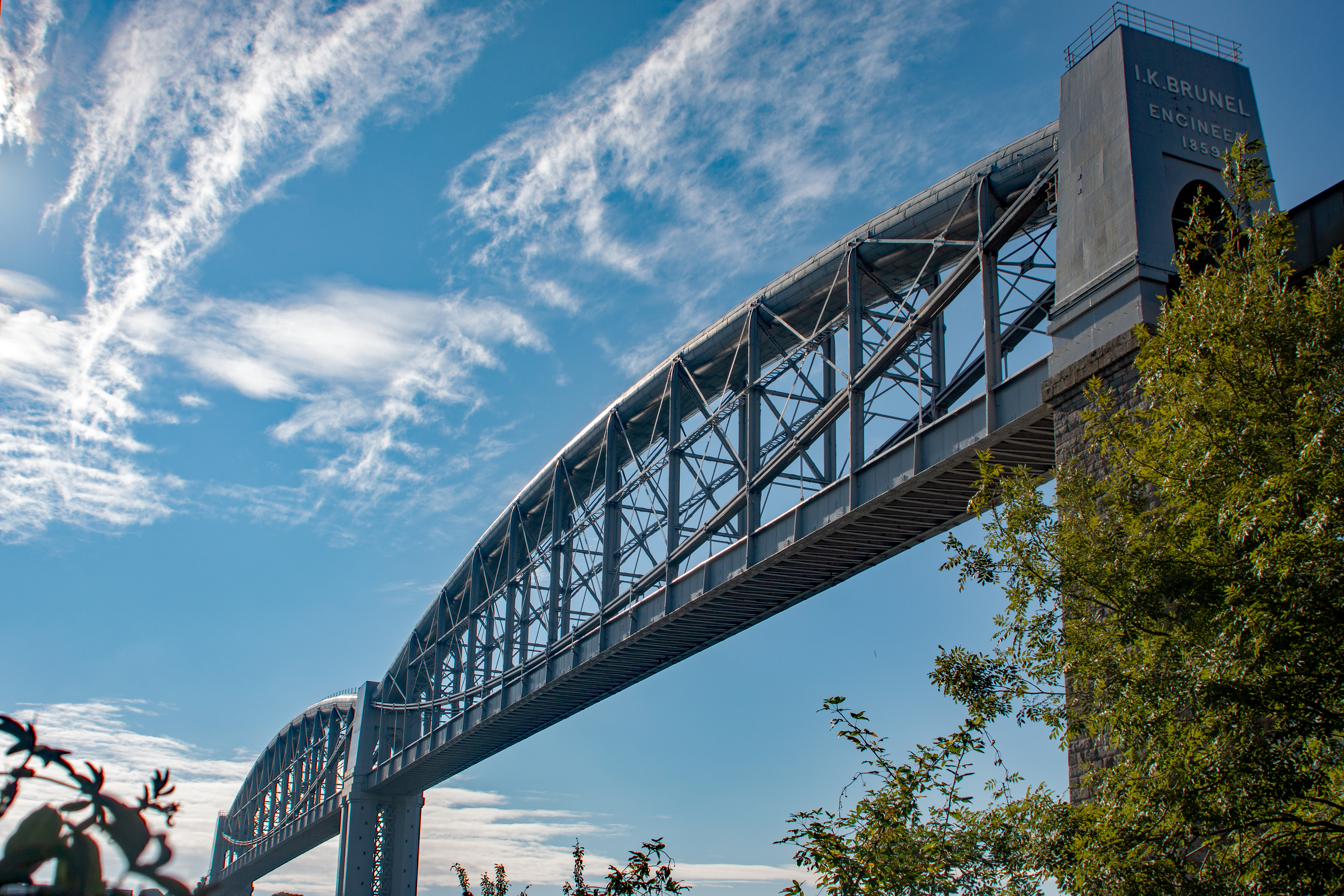
The refurbished bridge from Saltash Quay

The bridge was Grade I listed in 1952.

Additional links between the suspensions chains and the decking were added in 1969 to further strengthen the bridge. In 2011 Network Rail began a three-year £10 million refurbishment involving replacing 50,000 bolts and installation of 100 tonnes of new steelwork. The bridge has also been stripped back to the bare metal and repainted in the Goose Grey colour originally applied in 1952.

== Cultural impact ==
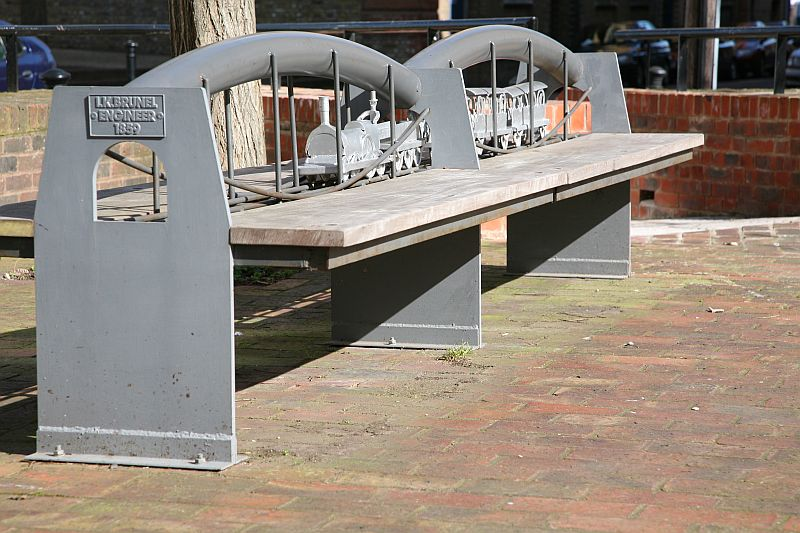
Bench seat at the Brunel Museum, Rotherhithe, London incorporating a model of the bridge with a train

The construction of such a large and distinctive bridge soon caught the attention of the general public. The launching of the Cornish span in 1857 attracted a crowd of around 20,000, with similar numbers said to have witnessed the launch of the Devonport span and the opening day. During its construction it was photographed many times and after its opening it was the subject for many paintings, including those by Devonport-born artist Alfred Wallis. It has also been the subject of many photographs and postcards.

It was already a feature in guidebooks in the year of its opening: "It is a labour of Hercules, but Mr Brunel has accomplished the feat," proclaimed one, and went on to report in detail the design and construction of the bridge that "for novelty and ingenuity of construction stands unrivalled in the world". More than 100 years later it continues to appear in many travel guides and features. John Betjeman summed up its impact on the traveller:

The general grey slate and back gardens of Plymouth, as seen from the Great Western made the surprise of Saltash Bridge all the more exciting. Up and down stream, grey battleships were moored in the Tamar and its reaches. Hundreds of feet below, the pathetic steam ferry to Saltash from the Devon bank tried to compete with Brunel's mighty bridge.

The bridge has become a symbol of the transition from Devon to Cornwall. In the Great Western Railway's The Cornish Riviera travel guide, SPB Mais regarded it as "an almost magic means of transporting travellers from a county, which, if richer than others, is yet unmistakingly an English county, to a Duchy which is in every respect un-English. You shut your eyes going over the Saltash Bridge only to open them again on a foreign scene".

=== Special events ===
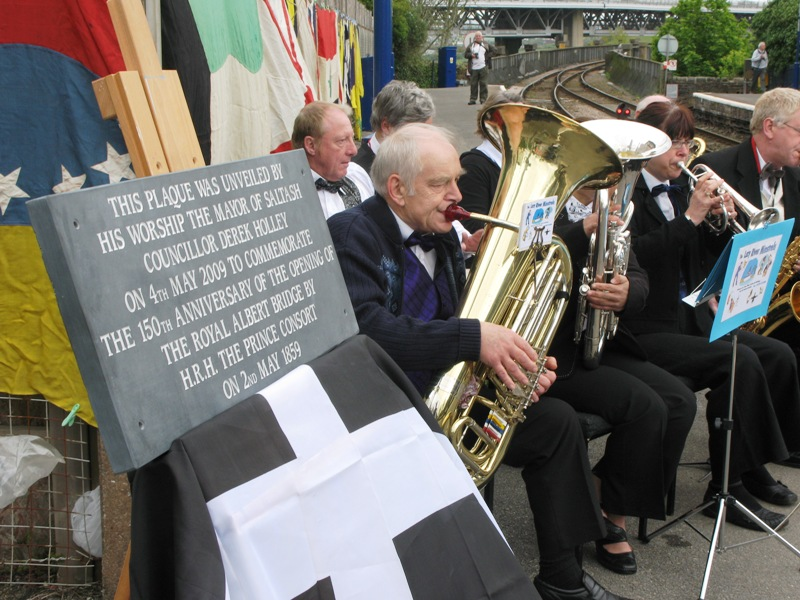
A new commemorative plaque was unveiled at Saltash station on 4 May 2009 to recognise the 150th anniversary of the bridge.

Special occasions have been marked over the years by special events:

- 1859 – The bridge was opened by Prince Albert two days before the railway was opened to the public. He arrived by special train from Windsor, was shown around the bridge and the works yard, and then left aboard the Royal Yacht.
- 1959 – Floodlights lit up the bridge during 1959 in celebration of its centenary.
- 2006 – The 200th anniversary of Isambard Kingdom Brunel's birth was celebrated by Network Rail permanently removing the access ways that covered his name above the portals.
- 2009 – During the bank holiday weekend of 2–4 May there were many special events to commemorate the 150th anniversary of the opening of the bridge including a guided walk across the bridge and a re-enactment of the opening day.
