= Windsor Railway Bridge =

Bridge in Berkshire crossing the River Thames

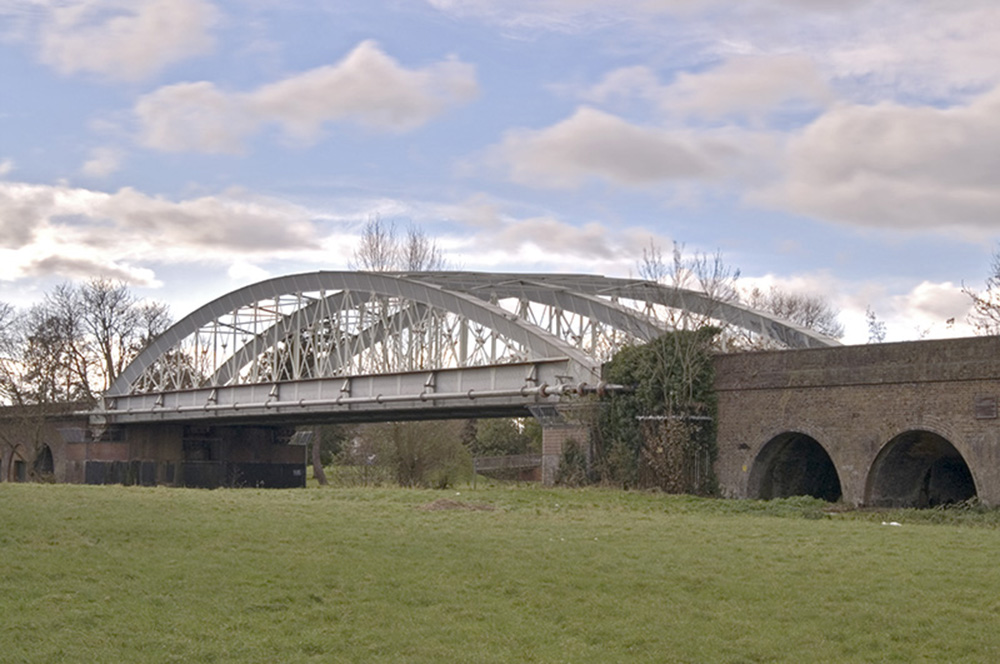
- Windsor Railway Bridge, downstream side, looking towards Windsor
- Coordinates: 51°29′12.5″N 0°37′04.5″W
- Carries: Slough to Windsor & Eton Line
- Crosses: River Thames
- Locale: Windsor, Berkshire, England
- Maintained by: Network Rail

Characteristics
- Design: Bowstring
- Material: Wrought Iron
- Width: 202 feet (62 m)
- Height: 17 feet 9 inches (5.41 m)
- No. of spans: 1

History
- Designer: Brunel
- Opened: 1849

Listed Building – Grade II*
- Official name: Railway bridge carrying the Windsor Slough line over the Thames
- Designated: 2 October 1975
- Reference no.: 1319297

Location
- Interactive map of Windsor Railway Bridge

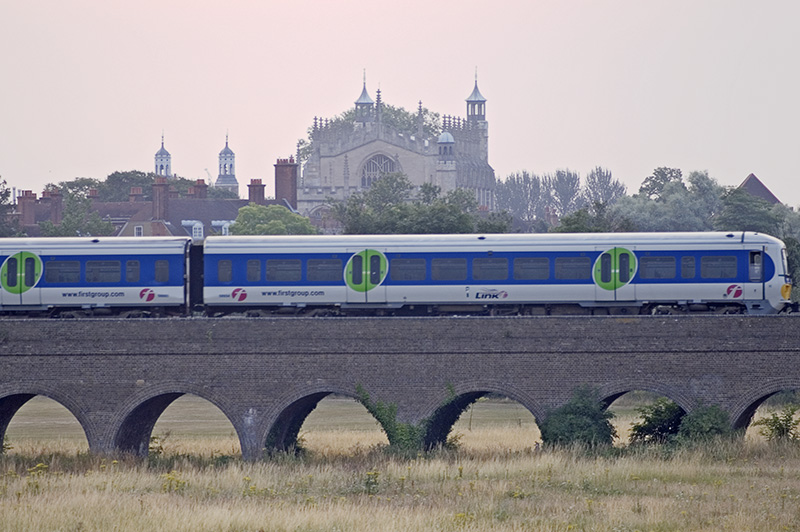
The brick viaduct carrying the GWR line into Windsor, looking east towards Eton College

Windsor Railway Bridge is a wrought iron 'bow and string' bridge in Windsor, Berkshire, England, crossing the River Thames on the reach between Romney Lock and Boveney Lock. It carries the branch line between Slough and Windsor.

The Windsor Railway Bridge was designed by the famed British civil engineer Isambard Kingdom Brunel, and is considered to be a forerunner to his last major work, the Royal Albert Bridge. It was built during the 1840s to carry the Slough to Windsor & Eton Line of the Great Western Railway (GWR). On account of concerns raised by the Provost of Eton College, the bridge had to cross the river while keeping it unobstructed in its entirety. Construction of the railway was subsequently authorised during 1848 and proceeded at a rapid pace, the line and bridge alike being first opened to traffic on 8 October 1849.

During the early 1860s, the original wooden approach viaducts were replaced by arched brick counterparts. During 1908, the bridge's cast iron piles were replaced by brick abutments, somewhat shortening its span to 184 feet 6 inches (56.24 m), as well as the replacement of both cross girders and rail bearers with steel equivalents. While the Windsor Railway Bridge was originally built to carry a twin-track arrangement, only a single line has crossed the bridge since the railway was singled as a rationalisation measure during the 1960s. In 1975 the bridge became a Grade II* listed building.

== History ==
The construction of what would become Slough to Windsor & Eton Line was an early ambition of the Great Western Railway (GWR), but had been delayed and thus unable to be included in the original act of Parliament obtained by the company on account of objections raised by the Provost of the nearby Eton College. Parliamentary approval for the line was finally issued in 1848, but was accompanied by a provision for the protection of amenities pertaining to the college, which included the requirement that the River Thames be kept clear where the railway crossed it, thus necessitating advanced design and materials.

Irrespective of this complication, construction of the line and bridge alike commenced almost immediately. The contractor appointed to build the bridge was a Mr George Hannet. On 8 October 1849, the completed route was opened to traffic.

Since its completion, numerous refurbishments and alternations to the original structure have been performed. Between 1861 and 1865, the original wooden trestle viaducts forming the approaches to the Windsor Railway Bridge were replaced by arched brick equivalents. During 2019 the viaduct was visually restored, removing graffiti.

== Design ==
The Windsor Railway Bridge is a single-span structure, comprising three bowstring trusses which formed two bays, each carrying one of the original pair of tracks traversing the bridge. It is believed to be the world's oldest wrought iron railway bridge that remains in regular service. Designed by Isambard Kingdom Brunel, the bridge has been considered to be a forerunner of Brunel's final masterpiece, the Royal Albert Bridge at Saltash. Due to its historical and engineering significance, the Windsor Railway Bridge became a Grade II* listed building in 1975.

As originally built, the bridge had a skewed span of 202 feet (62 m), which were carried on 6-foot (1.8 m) diameter cast iron piles filled with concrete. However, during 1908, these piles were replaced by several brick abutments; this alteration also had the effect of reducing the bridge's span to 184 feet 6 inches (56.24 m). In conjunction with this work, other refurbishments of the bridge were carried out, such as the replacement of both cross girders and rail bearers with steel counterparts.

Although the bridge bore two tracks, that on the upstream (west) side was removed as one of the rationalisations of the 1960s. The resulting space has since been reused for a sewer and a water main.

The accessing southern viaduct is 2,000 feet (610 m) to Windsor and Eton Central, which is at street level as to its castle end where the land is at similar height; the northern is 3,240 feet (990 m), thus a single plain-spanning bridge-viaduct measures more than 1 mile (1.6 km).

== See also ==
- Crossings of the River Thames
- Grade II* listed buildings in Berkshire

Next crossing upstream	River Thames	Next crossing downstream
Queen Elizabeth Bridge (road)	Windsor Railway Bridge	Windsor Bridge
