= Ned Ashton House =

Historic house in Iowa, United States

- U.S. National Register of Historic Places
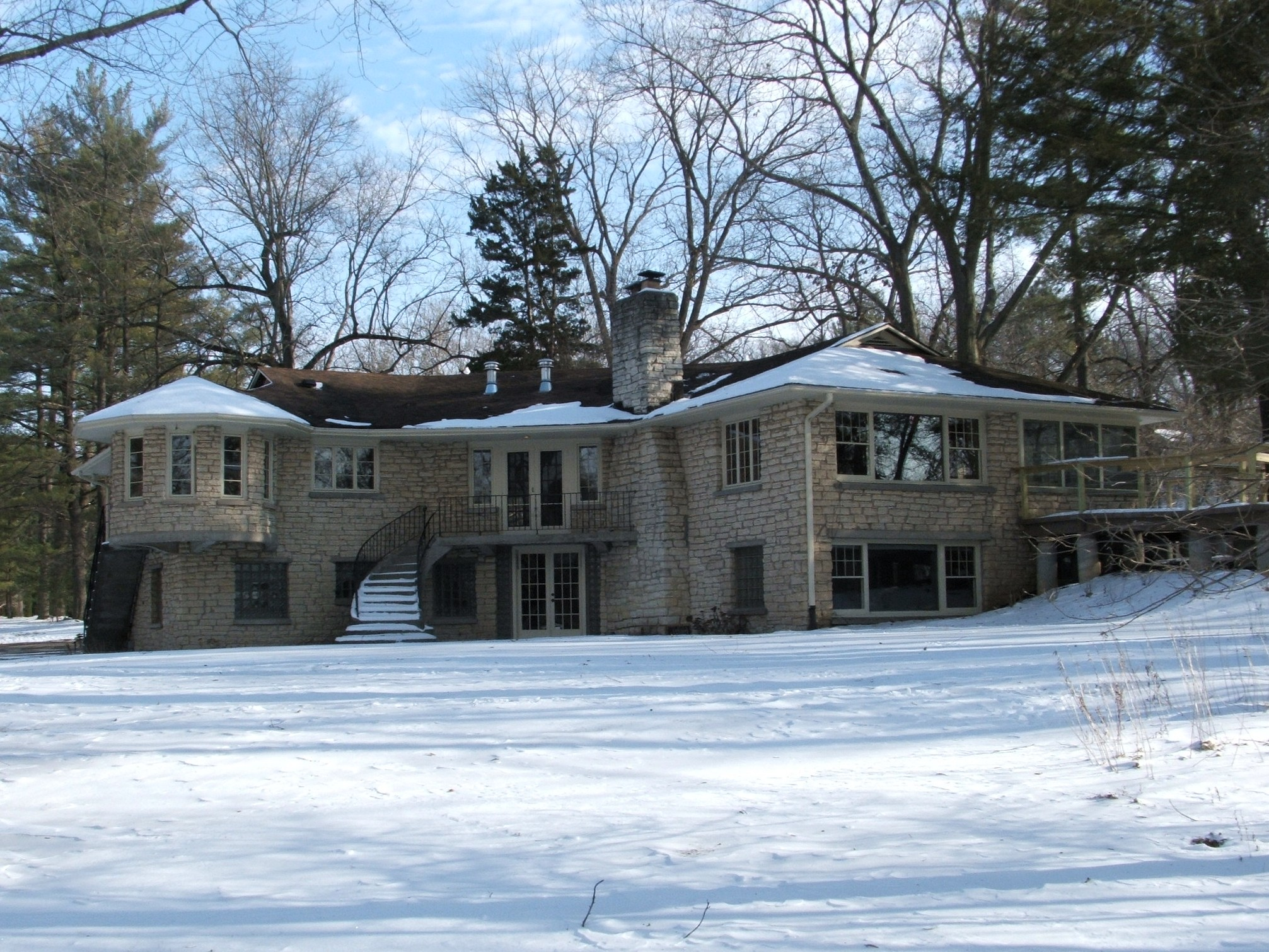
- View from the northwest

- Location within Iowa Location within the United States
- Location: 820 Park Rd. Iowa City, Iowa
- Coordinates: 41°40′20″N 91°33′3″W
- Area: 2.2 acres (0.89 ha)
- Built: 1948
- Architect: Edward L. Ashton
- Architectural style: Modern Movement
- NRHP reference No.: 88000927 and 00001677
- Added to NRHP: January 26, 2001

The Ned Ashton House in Iowa City, Iowa, also known as the Edward L. Ashton House or as Ashton House, was built in 1947-1948 and listed on the National Register of Historic Places in 2001.

The house was built in 1947 by Edward L. "Ned" Ashton as a private residence. Ashton, who has been called "the most distinguished bridge engineer in the history of Iowa," was a professor of civil engineering at the University of Iowa from 1943 to 1957. He designed several bridges over the Mississippi River including the Julien Dubuque and Davenport Centennial bridges, as well as smaller bridges such as the Iowa City Benton Street Bridge, which was a pioneering design of welded plate girder bridges.

The single-story raised-ranch house, built from Anamosa limestone (dolomite), and poured concrete, shows Prairie School influence in the way it was incorporated into its location alongside the Iowa River. Both the main and lower levels of the house provided excellent views of the river.

The poured concrete construction of the house utilized bridge span design creating one large lower level open room. The concrete floor pour level was marked with a grease pencil when the water level of the then flooded Iowa River receded to the needed height, assuring a level floor.

The house was built in a flood prone area with knowledge that the Army Corps of Engineers Coralville flood control dam was to be built upstream. Ashton designed the house to facilitate the flow of flood water through the lower level.

Ashton employed his University of Iowa College of Engineering students. The large, open lower level had nine full size drafting tables, bookshelves along the southwest wall, metal file cabinets and racks of printed plans along the southeast wall. The west side of the workshop provided excellent views of the river.

== Flooding and Acquisition by Iowa City ==
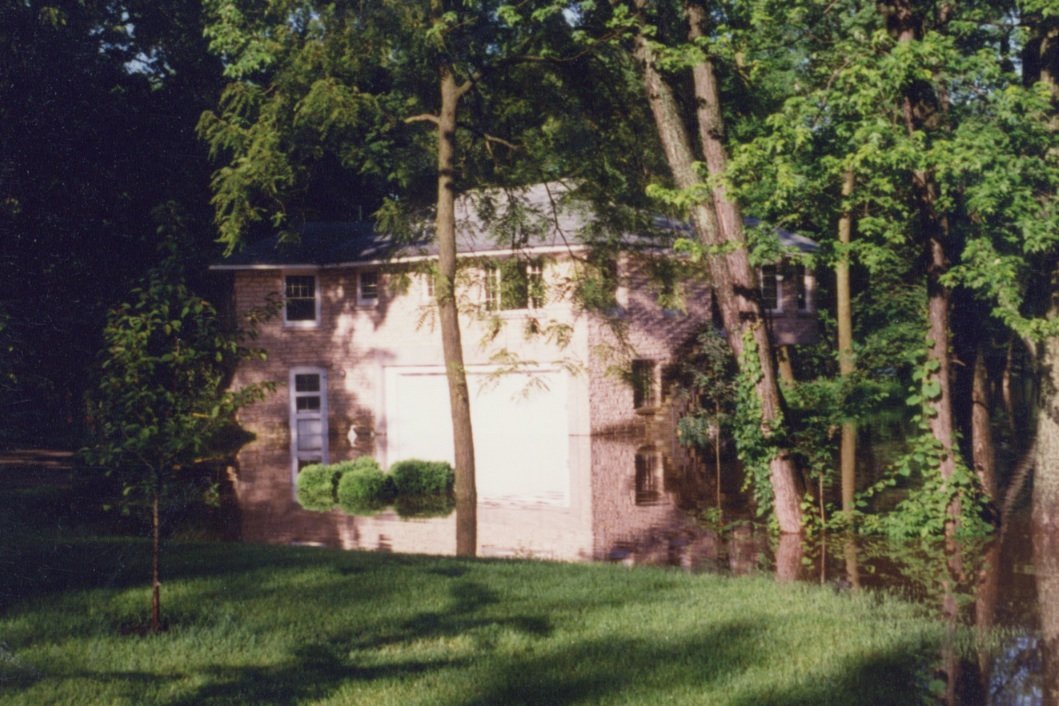
Floodwater of the Iowa River entering the garage and basement of the Ashton House, July 6, 1993.

The basement level of the Ashton House was flooded in both the Great Flood of 1993 and the Iowa flood of 2008. The latter flood caused an estimated $177,247 in damages to the property, valued at $487,388 prior to the flood.

Following the 2008 flood, Iowa City began buying up flooded properties. As of Oct. 25, 2011, the city had purchased the Ashton House. By the end of the buy-out program in mid-2012, the city had purchased all but one neighboring house, with demolition slated for completion before 2013. The city plans to preserve the Ned Ashton House, renting it out as a venue for such events as receptions and meetings.

== See also ==
- National Register of Historic Places listings in Johnson County, Iowa
