= Plate girder bridge =

Type of bridge

Plate Girder Bridge
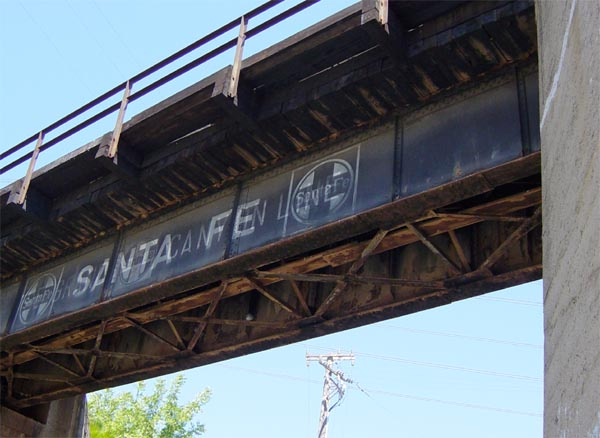
- Wooden deck type
- Ancestor: Beam bridge
- Related: Trestle bridge, truss bridge, moon bridge
- Descendant: Leaf bascule, Tubular bridge
- Carries: Pedestrians, automobiles, trucks, light rail, heavy rail
- Span range: Short
- Material: Iron, steel
- Movable: No
- Design effort: low
- Falsework required: No

A plate girder bridge is a bridge supported by two or more plate girders.

== Overview ==
In a plate girder bridge, the plate girders are typically I-beams made up from separate structural steel plates (rather than rolled as a single cross-section), which are welded or, in older bridges, bolted or riveted together to form the vertical web and horizontal flanges of the beam. In some cases, the plate girders may be formed in a Z-shape rather than I-shape. The first tubular wrought iron plate girder bridge was built in 1846-47 by James Millholland for the Baltimore and Ohio Railroad.

Plate girder bridges are suitable for short to medium spans and may support railroads, highways, or other traffic. Plate girders are usually prefabricated and the length limit is frequently set by the mode of transportation used to move the girder from the bridge shop to the bridge site.

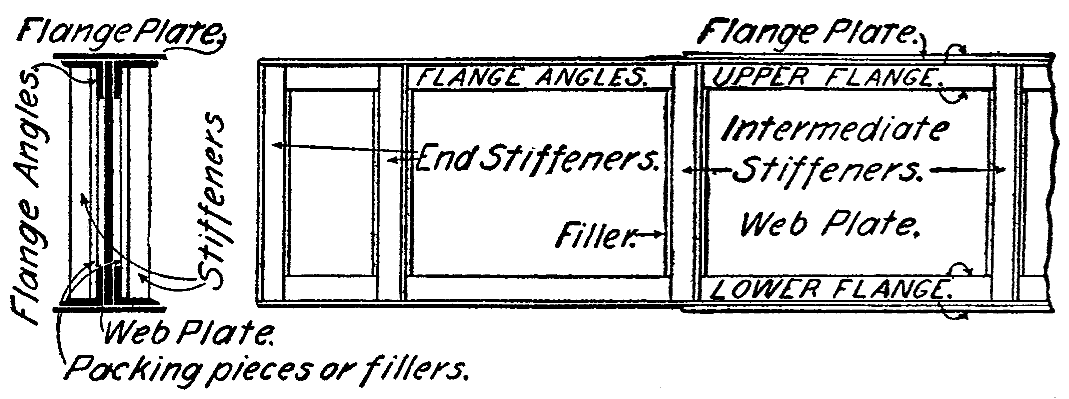
Anatomy of a plate girder.

Generally, the depth of the girder is no less than 1/15 the span, and for a given load bearing capacity, a depth of around 1/12 the span minimizes the weight of the girder. Stresses on the flanges near the centre of the span are greater than near the end of the span, so the top and bottom flange plates are frequently reinforced in the middle portion of the span. Vertical stiffeners prevent the web plate from buckling under shear stresses. These are typically uniformly spaced along the girder with additional stiffeners over the supports and wherever the bridge supports concentrated loads.

== Deck-type plate girder bridge ==
In the deck-type bridge, a wood, steel or reinforced concrete bridge deck is supported on top of two or more plate girders, and may act compositely with them. In the case of railroad bridges, the railroad ties themselves may form the bridge deck, or the deck may support ballast on which the track is laid. Additional beams may connect the main girders, for example in the form of bridge known as ladder-deck construction. Also, further elements may be attached to provide cross-bracing and prevent the girders from buckling.

== Semi-through plate girder bridge ==
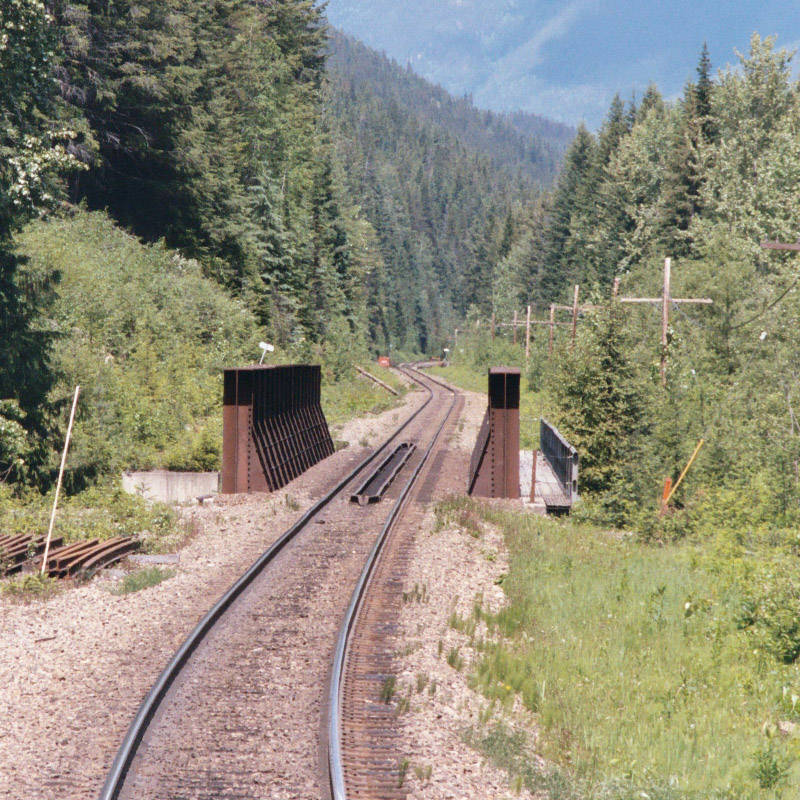
Plate girder bridge: half-through type.

In the half-through bridge (also called a pony truss), the bridge deck is supported between two plate girders, often on top of the bottom flange. The overall bridge then has a 'U'-shape in cross-section. As cross-bracing cannot normally be added, vertical stiffeners on the girders are normally used to prevent buckling (technically described as 'U-frame behaviour'). This form of bridge is most often used on railroads as the construction depth (distance between the underside of the vehicle, and the underside of the bridge) is much less. This allows obstacles to be cleared with less change in height.

== Multi-span plate girder bridge ==
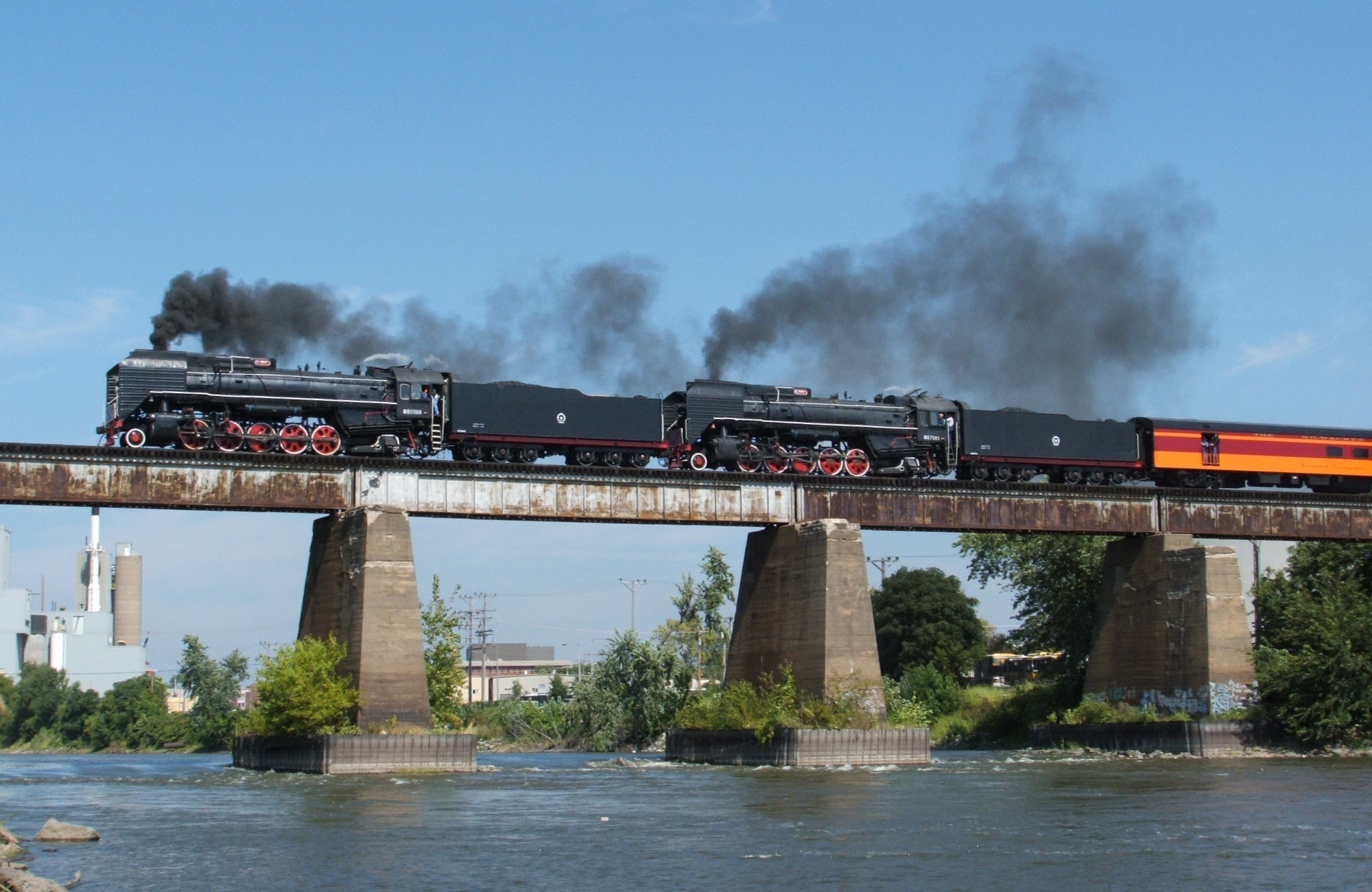
Multispan Plate girder bridge: deck type on concrete piers.

Multispan plate-girder bridges may be an economical way to span gaps longer than can be spanned by a single girder. Spacing of piers between the abutments is dependent on the capacity of the selected plate girders. Separate plate girder bridges span between each pair of abutments in order to allow for expansion joints between the spans. Concrete is commonly used for low piers, while steel trestle work may be used for high bridges.

== See also ==
- Beam bridge — the ancestor of the plate girder bridge
- Box girder bridge — an evolution of the plate girder bridge
- Balloon flange girder
- Pin and hanger assembly
- Trestle — some modern steel trestles are composed of a number of girder bridge segments
