= Grimsby Rural District =

Former local government area in the UK

Coordinates: 53.52°N 0.15°W

- Former subdivision of United Kingdom
- 1894–1974
- Grimsby Rural District shown within Parts of Lindsey in 1970.
- History
  - Created: 1894
  - Abolished: 1974
  - Succeeded by: borough of Cleethorpes
- Status: Rural district
- History
  - Established: 1894
  - Disestablished: 1 April 1974
- Today part of: United Kingdom

Grimsby Rural District was a rural district in Lincolnshire, England, part of the administrative county of Lindsey, from 1894 to 1974.

The district covered the town of Immingham and the parishes of Ashby-cum-Fenby, Aylesby, Barnoldby-le-Beck, Beelsby, Bradley, Brigsley, East Ravendale, Habrough, Hatcliffe, Hawerby-cum-Beesby, Healing, Humberston, Irby, Laceby, New Waltham (from 1961), Stallingborough, Waltham, West Ravendale, and Wold Newton.

Four additional parishes were part of the district at some point, but were abolished prior to 1974. Little Coates was split between Grimsby borough and Great Coates parish in 1928. Scartho went to Grimsby borough and Waltham parish in 1928, and Great Coates went to Grimsby borough and Healing parish in 1968. Finally, Weelsby was given to Humberston and New Waltham parishes in 1968.

The rural district was separate from the Grimsby county borough and the Municipal Borough of Cleethorpes, which it surrounded on three sides. When the county of Humberside was formed in 1974, the Grimsby rural district and the Cleethorpes municipal borough were combined to form the new borough of Cleethorpes. In 1996 the area became part of the new unitary authority of North East Lincolnshire.
