= List of schools in North East Lincolnshire =

This is a list of schools in North East Lincolnshire, England.

== State-funded schools ==
=== Primary schools ===
- Bursar Primary Academy, Cleethorpes
- The Canon Peter Hall CE Primary School, Immingham
- Coomb Briggs Primary Academy, Immingham
- East Ravendale CE Primary Academy, Grimsby
- Eastfield Primary Academy, Immingham
- Edward Heneage Primary Academy, Grimsby
- Elliston Primary Academy, Cleethorpes
- Enfield Academy of New Waltham, New Waltham
- Fairfield Academy, Scartho
- Grange Primary School, Grimsby
- Great Coates Primary School, Grimsby
- Healing Primary Academy, Healing
- The Humberston CE Primary School, Humberston
- Humberston Cloverfields Academy, Humberston
- Laceby Acres Primary Academy, Grimsby
- Lisle Marsden CE Primary Academy, Grimsby
- Littlecoates Primary Academy, Grimsby
- Macaulay Primary Academy, Grimsby
- Middlethorpe Primary Academy, Cleethorpes
- New Waltham Academy, New Waltham
- Oasis Academy Nunsthorpe, Grimsby
- Old Clee Primary Academy, Grimsby
- Ormiston South Parade Academy, Grimsby
- Pilgrim Academy, Grimsby
- Queen Mary Avenue Infants School, Cleethorpes
- Reynolds Primary Academy, Cleethorpes
- St Joseph's RC Primary Academy, Cleethorpes
- St Mary's RC Academy, Grimsby
- St Peter's CE Primary School, Cleethorpes
- Scartho Infants' School and Nursery, Scartho
- Scartho Junior Academy, Scartho
- Signhills Academy, Grimsby
- Signhills Infant Academy, Grimsby
- Springfield Primary Academy, Grimsby
- Stallingborough CE Primary School, Stallingborough
- Stanford Junior and Infant School, Laceby
- Strand Primary Academy, Grimsby
- Thrunscoe Primary and Nursery Academy, Cleethorpes
- Waltham Leas Primary Academy, Waltham
- Weelsby Academy, Grimsby
- Welholme Academy, Grimsby
- Western Primary School, Grimsby
- William Barcroft Junior School, Cleethorpes
- Willows Academy, Grimsby
- Woodlands Academy, Grimsby
- Wybers Wood Academy, Grimsby
- Yarborough Academy, Grimsby

=== Secondary schools ===
- Beacon Academy, Cleethorpes
- Cleethorpes Academy, Cleethorpes
- Havelock Academy, Grimsby
- Healing School, Healing
- Humberston Academy, Humberston
- John Whitgift Academy, Grimsby
- Oasis Academy Immingham, Immingham
- Oasis Academy Wintringham, Grimsby
- Ormiston Maritime Academy, Grimsby
- Tollbar Academy, New Waltham

=== Special and alternative schools ===
- Cambridge Park Academy, Grimsby
- Humberston Park School, Humberston
- Phoenix Park Academy, Grimsby
- Sevenhills Academy, Grimsby

=== Further education ===
- Grimsby Institute of Further & Higher Education
- Linkage College

== Independent schools ==
=== Primary and preparatory schools ===
- St Martin's Preparatory School, Grimsby

=== Senior and all-through schools ===
- St James School, Grimsby

=== Special and alternative schools ===
- Best Futures, Aylesby
- Learning4Life-Gy, Grimsby
- The Orchard Independent Special School, Grimsby
