= List of settlements in Lincolnshire by population =

The 28 largest settlements of Lincolnshire, with Manby. District centres in yellow. Key towns and cities surrounding the county shown in blue.

This is a list of settlements in Lincolnshire by population based on the results of the 2011 census. The next United Kingdom census will take place in 2021. In 2011, there were 28 built-up area subdivisions with 5,000 or more inhabitants in Lincolnshire, shown in the table below.

== List of settlements ==
Rank	Built up area subdivision	Population (2001 census)	Population (2011 census)	District	Outlying areas detail
1	Lincoln	104,221	100,160	Lincoln	North Hykeham included in 2001. Bracebridge Heath, Washingborough counted separately. Burton-by-Lincoln, Canwick, Harmston, North Greetwell, Nettleham, Riseholme, Skellingthorpe excluded
2	Grimsby	87,574	88,243	North East Lincolnshire	Cleethorpes, New Waltham, Waltham counted separately. Bradley, Healing, Laceby excluded
3	Scunthorpe	72,660	79,977	North Lincolnshire	Berkeley, Bottesford, Yaddlethorpe included. Flixborough, Raventhorpe excluded
4	Grantham	34,592	41,998	South Kesteven	Barrowby, Belton, Great Gonerby, Harlaxton, Spittlegate excluded
5	Boston	35,124	41,340	Boston	Skirbeck, Wyberton included. Kirton counted separately. Fishtoft, Frampton, Freiston, Haltoft End, Hubberts Bridge, Kirton End, Kirton Holme excluded
6	Cleethorpes	31,853	39,505	North East Lincolnshire	Humberston included
7	Spalding	22,081	31,588	South Holland	Crossgate, Pinchbeck, Pode Hole included. Cowbit, Low Fulney, Surfleet, Weston, Weston Hills excluded
8	Skegness	20,694	24,876	East Lindsey	Chapel St Leonards, Ingoldmells, Seacroft, Winthorpe included. Addlethorpe, Hogsthorpe excluded
9	Gainsborough	19,110	20,842	West Lindsey	Lea, Morton included. Knaith Park excluded
10	Stamford	19,525	19,701	South Kesteven	Northfields, Newtown/Toll Bar included. Borderville, Great Casterton (Rutland), Newstead, Tinwell, Wothorpe excluded
11	Sleaford	15,219	17,359	North Kesteven	Holdingham, Quarrington included
12	Louth	15,930	16,419	East Lindsey	Keddington, Stewton excluded
13	North Hykeham		14,719	North Kesteven	Included within Lincoln's figure in 2001. South Hykeham, Thorpe-on-the-Hill excluded
14	Bourne	11,482	13,961	South Kesteven	Eastgate, Elsea Park, Westfield included. Cawthorpe, Dyke, Thurlby excluded
15	Market Deeping	13,588	13,574	South Kesteven	Frognall included. Langtoft excluded
16	Mablethorpe	11,780	12,531	East Lindsey	Sutton-on-Sea, Trusthorpe included. Ossington excluded
17	Barton-upon-Humber	9,334	11,066	North Lincolnshire	Barton Waterside included
18	Immingham	11,090	10,750	North East Lincolnshire	East Halton, Habrough, Stallingborough excluded
19	Holbeach	7,247	7,914	South Holland	Fleet, Fleet Hargate, Guy's Wells, Holbeach Clough, Saracen's Head, Whaplode excluded
20	Horncastle	6,090	6,815	East Lindsey	High Toynton, Langton, Mareham, Thornton, Thimbleby excluded
21	Brigg	5,860	6,787	North Lincolnshire	Scawby, Wrawby excluded
22	Washingborough	6,274	6,463	North Kesteven	Heighington included
23	Waltham	6,420	6,057	North East Lincolnshire	New Waltham counted separately. Barnoldby-le-Beck, Brigsley excluded
24	Bracebridge Heath	4,530	5,656	North Kesteven	
25	Ruskington	4,950	5,637	North Kesteven	Dorrington excluded
26	New Waltham	4,958	5,613	North East Lincolnshire	Waltham counted separately, Holton le Clay excluded
27	Long Sutton	4,532	5,161	South Holland	Chapelgate, Gedney, Lutton, Sutton Bridge excluded
28	Coningsby	4,292	5,021	East Lindsey	
29	Winterton	4,729	4,899	North Lincolnshire	
30	Kirton	3,469	4,821	Boston	
31	Market Rasen	3,491	4,773	West Lindsey	
32	Broughton	4,677	4,677	North Lincolnshire	

Notes: The Office of National Statistics (ONS) subdivide built-up areas into sectors which do not respect administrative or political boundaries. If those areas have a strong city/town/village identity, for population purposes they are classed into a separate area.

== See also ==
- List of places in Lincolnshire
- List of civil parishes in Lincolnshire
