= Municipal Borough of Cleethorpes =

Urban district and borough in England

Cleethorpes
- Municipal Borough of Cleethorpes shown within Parts of Lindsey in 1970.
- Area
  - 1911: 1,185 acres (4.80 km^{2})
  - 1961: 2,268 acres (9.18 km^{2})
- Population
  - 1911: 21,417
  - 1961: 32,700
- History
  - Created: 1894
  - Abolished: 1974
  - Succeeded by: Cleethorpes borough
- Status: Urban District: 1894–1936; Municipal borough: 1936–1974
- Government: Cleethorpes Borough Council
  - HQ: Cleethorpes

Cleethorpes was an urban district and municipal borough in Parts of Lindsey, Lincolnshire, England from 1894 to 1974.

It was created as an urban district in 1894 under the Local Government Act 1894 and subsequently elevated to the status of municipal borough in 1936.

The borough was abolished in 1974 under the Local Government Act 1972 and combined with the Grimsby Rural District to form the new Cleethorpes borough in Humberside. The post-1974 Cleethorpes borough was subsequently abolished in 1996 and replaced with the North East Lincolnshire unitary authority.
