= Wold Newton, Lincolnshire =

Village and civil parish in North East Lincolnshire, England

Coordinates: 53.453740°N 0.128784°W

Wold Newton
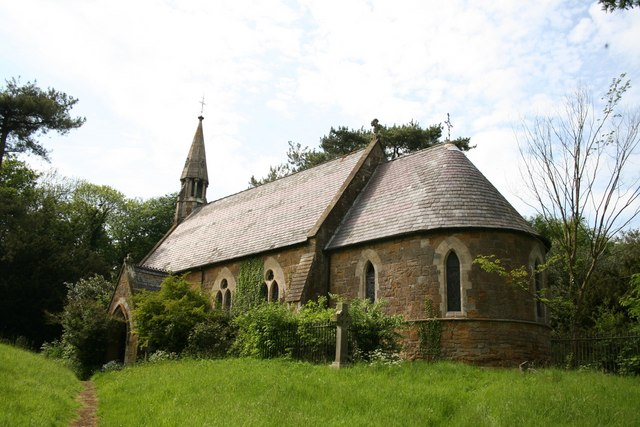
- All Saints' Church, Wold Newton

- Location within Lincolnshire
- OS grid reference: TF243968
  - London: 135 mi (217 km) S
- Unitary authority: North East Lincolnshire
- Ceremonial county: Lincolnshire
- Region: Yorkshire and the Humber
- Country: England
- Sovereign state: United Kingdom
- Post town: Market Rasen
- Postcode district: LN8
- Police: Humberside
- Fire: Humberside
- Ambulance: East Midlands
- UK Parliament: Brigg and Immingham

Wold Newton is a village and civil parish in North East Lincolnshire, England. It is situated just over 1 mile (1.6 km) west from the A18 road, 7 miles (11 km) north-west from Louth, and 9.5 miles (15 km) north-east from Market Rasen.

== History ==
=== Origins ===
Although archaeological evidence and analysis of place names indicates millennia of settlement within the current parish boundary, the etymology of the name 'Wold Newton' most likely dates the Viking Age. It is probable that today's settlement began as a new Anglo-Saxon farm surrounded by Danish settlements. Coates' commentary on the place-names of Lincolnshire analyses the name 'Enschedik', the ancient name of a ditch running between the parishes of Wold Newton and Hawerby-cum-Beesby, to mean "English ditch". In Coates' view it is "tempting to regard it as a feature made when the 'new farm' of [Wold] Newton was inserted into an essentially Danish landscape".

=== Archaeology ===
The most significant archaeological discovery in Wold Newton was the discovery of Anglo Saxon urns in the field, Swinhope Walk, in 1828 by road workers quarrying gravel. The site was subsequently excavated by the Rev. Dr. Oliver, Vicar of Scopwick, Lincoln, who reported at a meeting of The Archaeological Institute the discovery of a:

large tumulus, spreading over about three acres, and composed entirely of gravel.... Upon this tumulus was ... a long barrow ... in which more than twenty urns, of various forms, had been deposited, arranged in a line, the whole length of the mound, the mouths upwards,. They lay about three feet from the surface, and at irregular distances, some being close together, others three or four feet apart. Three only were preserved, and they were sent ... to the Society of Antiquaries of Scotland. They were fabricated without the use of the lathe, and rudely scored with lines and circles; these urns were half filled with ashes, calcined bones, and black greasy earth. [He supposed] that this tumulus had been a family burying-place of some British chief, the larger mound being possibly the cemetery of his tribe.

English Heritage NMR Monument Reports record a range of possible historic sites within the parish from analysis of cropmarks. These include prehistoric or Roman enclosures; boundaries; trackways and the remains of a settlement consisting of tofts, crofts, buildings, boundaries hollow ways. English Heritage also records the finding of a Roman coin, a silver denarius of Trajan, dated to 114–117 AD.

Field walking in 1989 collected mediaeval and Roman pottery, and flint artefacts.

=== Turnpike ===
The Grimsby to Wold Newton Turnpike Act was passed in 1765.

Until the advent of the turnpike trust system, local villagers were responsible for the upkeep of the roads in their parish. As road transport increased in the 17th and 18th centuries the concept of charging travellers for using the road spawned the idea of the turnpike trust, each one created by individual act of parliament. A turnpike trust could borrow money to pay for road improvement and charge people for using it.

The Wold Newton turnpike, the only turnpike out of Grimsby, provided a route across the low-lying marshland surrounding Grimsby up on to the dry lands of the Wolds, ending at Wold Newton church. From Wold Newton, the traveller had to resort to the existing unimproved roads. There were toll gates at Brigsley Beck, where the toll house still stands on the north side of the road on the west side of the beck. An iron milestone from 1826 still stands on the side of the road, 300 metres north of North Farm.

=== Water ===
Wold Newton sits in a dry valley of the Lincolnshire Wolds. The nearest running water is 2.5 miles (4.0 km) away in the beck which flows through Swinhope and Thorganby and alternative sources of water would have been required. In Wold Newton people both collected rainwater and exploited ground water sources, and considerable evidence remains as to what they did in Victorian times and in the early decades of the 20th century.

A borehole was sunk for general village supply in 1910 and powered by a John Wallis Titt wind pump, which was latterly converted to electricity. To supply the livestock in the fields a second John Wallis Titt wind pump took the water up to a smaller reservoir in what is now Martin's Wood. Mains water only arrived in the village in the 1970s.

=== Land ownership ===
The Earls of Yarborough owned Wold Newton from the late 18th century until the agricultural depression towards the end of the 19th century, when the estate was sold, to pay off debts, to one of their Wold Newton tenants, William Wright.

The Yarboroughs had acquired the estate from the Welfitt family, who had held it during the 17th and 18th centuries but had to relinquish it after having mortgaged it too heavily.

Immediately after the Norman conquest the parish was split between three feudal lords: the Bishop of Durham, Earl Alan and a group of thanes including one Sortibrand. In turn they had between them five tenants: Grinchel, Walbert, Ingemund, Wimund and Justan.

== Geology ==
Wold Newton is situated on the eastern side of the Lincolnshire Wolds and the parish contains the highest point in North East Lincolnshire at 384 feet (117 m). The geology and topography of Wold Newton are based on the massive chalk deposits of the Cretaceous Period (145 to 66 million years ago) and the subsequent glaciation during the coolest period of the current Ice Age.

The topography of Wold Newton and the Lincolnshire Wolds was created by the sequence of glaciation and melting during two ice incursions of the last glacial period. The Wold Newton valley was a conduit for melt water which flowed down to East Ravendale and then into West Ravendale where a narrow gorge is cut through to the edge of the Wolds, joining water coming from Thorseway via Croxby Ponds.

At Petterhills, there was a proglacial lake in which silts were laid down. These silts were used briefly in the 18th and 19th centuries for making bricks. The wood on the south side of Petterhills Pond used to be called Osier Holt, presumably because willows were grown there, taking advantage of the wet ground.

The most interesting geological feature in Wold Newton is a "marker unit" of stratigraphic value, recorded by the British Geological Survey, which can be found in the chalk pit at the west end of the Valley. The marker unit is known as the Wootton Marls. This marl is grey in colour and about 1 cm thick. It commonly splits to form a double layer with localised areas of a marl complex up to 2 cm thick. Separating the upper and lower Wootton Marls is white chalk, containing discrete nodular flints up to 40 cm thick.

== Population ==
Year	Population
1603	57 communicants
1676	67
1705	22 families
1723	23 families
1841	146
1842	158
1851	179 175
1856	179
1861	189
1871	180
1881	165
1891	172
1901	146
1911	144
1921	134
1931	145

The population figures for 1841, 1851, 1861, 1871, 1881, 1891, 1901, 1911, 1921 and 1931 are from the UK census that was taken in those years.

== Church ==
The present church was dedicated by the Archbishop of Canterbury on All Saints Day in 1862. It is the fifth church on the site. Two simple buildings preceded what was probably the finest church, built in the 12th century. This church was destroyed during the English Civil War when parliamentary troops came from Hull and a skirmish ensued in the churchyard. The font, which dates from the 14th century, is all that remains of the third church. A simple building served as the church from the restoration of the monarchy in 1660 until the present church was built in 1861–62 by James Fowler, paid for in part by a grant from the Incorporated Society for Promoting the Enlargement, Building and Repairing of Churches and Chapels.

List of the Rectors of Wold Newton, together with their patrons:

Date	Name of Rector	Patron of Benefice	Curate
1235	Roger de Jackesham	The Bishop of Lincoln (Robert Grosseteste)	
1238	Thomas de Sutton	The King Henry III	
1247	Alexander de Bransfeld Hugh??	Convent of Durham	
1278	Roger de Askeby	The Bishop of Durham	
1279	Hugh de Wyleghby	The Bishop of Durham	
1291	Philip de Wylgby	The Bishop of Durham	
1305	Henry de Lusceby	The Bishop of Durham	
1318	Guy Bretoun	The King Edward II	
1319	John de Wellwyk		
1357	Robert Skyre	The Bishop of Durham	
1358	John Clerevaus	The Bishop of Durham	
1359	Henry Hay	The Bishop of Durham	
	Walter de Wyom	The Bishop of Durham	
1373	William Hannay	The Bishop of Durham	
1382	Thomas de Hedon	The Bishop of Durham	
1382	Richard de Hedon	The Bishop of Durham	
	Stephen Houden	The Bishop of Durham	
1391	Thomas de Paleste	The Bishop of Durham	
1392	Robert Halle	The Bishop of Durham	
1396	John Fendorn	The Bishop of Durham	
1407	Walter Byrchemore	The Bishop of Ely	
1417	William Popeler	The Bishop of Durham	
	John Wryght	The Bishop of Durham	
1434	Thomas Thorp	The Bishop of Durham	
	John Hood		
1443	Nicholas Bowey	The Bishop of Durham	
1453	William Thorp	The Bishop of Durham	
1455	John Watkynson	The Bishop of Durham	
	William Robyns		
1475	Thomas Hall	The Bishop of Durham	
1477	John Gornay	The Bishop of Durham	
1481	John Smyth	The Bishop of Durham	
1507	Anthony Hennage	The King Henry VII	
1557	Henry Dilcocke	Francis Aiscogh Knight	Thomas Icliffe Yeoman
1566	Richard Longworth	The Bishop of Durham	
1576	Thomas Pilkington	The Queen Elizabeth	
1615	William Richardson		
1619	Thomas Peir	The Bishop of Durham	
1626	Elias Petley	The Bishop of Durham	
1661	Theophilus Rusta	The Bishop of Durham	
1663	Timothy Carrington	The Bishop of Durham	
1708	Richard Thomson	The Bishop of Durham	
1719	William Thompson	The Bishop of Durham	
1721	James Boad	The Bishop of Durham	
1744	John Stephen Masson	The Bishop of Durham	
1745	Robert Alcock	The Bishop of Durham	Paul Lidgitt
1751	John Parkenson	The Bishop of Durham	
1793	Edward Ellison	The Bishop of Durham	
1795	Thomas Ellison	The Bishop of Durham	
1807	Bernard Gilpin	The Bishop of Durham	1813 John Grantham
			1822–43 Henry W. Powell
1832	Henry Millen	The Bishop of Durham	1842–55 Woodthorpe Johnson
1854	Charles Langley Maltby	The Bishop of Durham	1848–55 Archibald Paris
			1858–60 E. Bates
1859	George Wingfield Bourke	The Bishop of Durham	
1866	John Moss Webb	The Bishop of Lichfield	
1874	John Frederick Lloyd	The Bishop of Lichfield	
1875	Charles Bird Jackson	The Bishop of Lichfield	
1896	Edward Rivaz Fagan	The Queen Victoria	
1916	Bertram E. Bettison		
	A.H. Howard		
1958	F.G.Whatmough		
1967	John B.C.Hordern		
1972	S. W. Goodman		

In 1989, Wold Newton became part of the Binbrook group of parishes.

== War memorial ==
Wold Newton war memorial is a roadside cross at the north of the village. The memorial was erected by the squire, William Maurice Wright after the First World War. His motivation was probably the death of Cyril Compton Jackson on 22 November 1915, following a distinguished military career, whose father had been rector of the parish between 1875 and 1895, during Wright's childhood and adolescence.

It is clear from Wright's diaries that he was close to the Jackson family. At the time of his death, Cyril Jackson had been in the army for 27 years and it was 20 years since his family had left the village and Rectory, following the death of Jackson's father, the Rector.

The only person of the four commemorated on the memorial who had lived in the village immediately before going to war, was Charles Smith, who died in 1900 during the Boer War.

In October 2009, the war memorial in Wold Newton was used by the constituency MP, Shona McIsaac, as evidence for the poor condition of Britain's war memorials. It was mentioned in the House of Commons and an article subsequently appeared in the Telegraph.

== See also ==
- Wold Newton, East Riding of Yorkshire
