= West Ravendale =

Hamlet in the civil parish of East Ravendale, in North East Lincolnshire, England

Coordinates: 53.480563°N 0.151818°W

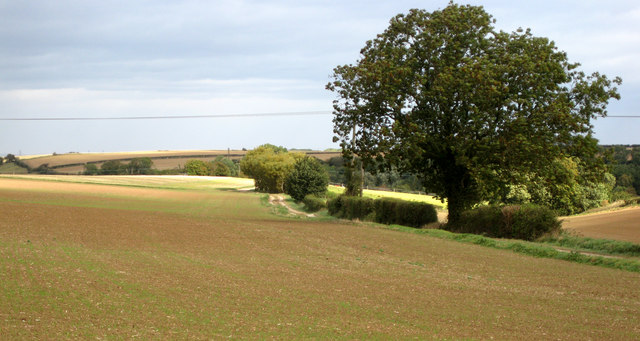
- Towards Priory Farm, West Ravendale

- Location within Lincolnshire
- OS grid reference: TF226999
  - London: 135 mi (217 km) S
- Unitary authority: North East Lincolnshire
- Ceremonial county: Lincolnshire
- Region: Yorkshire and the Humber
- Country: England
- Sovereign state: United Kingdom
- Postcode district: DN37
- Police: Humberside
- Fire: Humberside
- Ambulance: East Midlands
- UK Parliament: Brigg and Immingham

West Ravendale is a hamlet in the civil parish of East Ravendale, in North East Lincolnshire, England, and approximately 8 miles (13 km) south-west from the town of Grimsby.

The ruins of West Ravendale Priory are located here. It was a small Alien house of the Premonstratensian Order. It belonged to Beaufort Abbey in Brittany. The site is a scheduled monument and Grade II listed.
