= Borough of Cleethorpes =

Local government district in Humberside, England from 1974 to 1996

Coordinates: 53.550°N 0.178°W

Cleethorpes
- Cleethorpes shown within Humberside
- History
  - Created: 1 April 1974
  - Abolished: 1 April 1996
  - Succeeded by: North East Lincolnshire
- Status: Non-metropolitan district, borough
- Government
  - HQ: Cleethorpes
  - Motto: Vigilant in Faith and Industry

Cleethorpes was a local government district in Humberside, England from 1974 to 1996. It was granted borough status in 1975. It was formed on 1 April 1974 and covered Cleethorpes itself along with a wider area including Humberston, Laceby, Stallingborough, New Waltham, and Immingham (formerly part of the Grimsby Rural District). Based at Cleethorpes Town Hall, it was abolished on 1 April 1996 (along with Humberside) when it was merged with the borough of Great Grimsby as the new unitary North East Lincolnshire.

== See also ==
- Cleethorpes Borough Council elections
