= Cleethorpes Borough Council elections =

Local government elections in Humberside, England

Cleethorpes was a non-metropolitan district in Humberside, England. It was abolished on 1 April 1996 and replaced by North East Lincolnshire.

== Political control ==
The first election to the council was held in 1973, initially operating as a shadow authority before coming into its powers on 1 April 1974. Throughout its existence no party had a majority on the council.

Party in control	Years
No overall control	1974–1996

== Council elections ==
- 1973 Cleethorpes District Council election
- 1976 Cleethorpes Borough Council election
- 1979 Cleethorpes Borough Council election (New ward boundaries)
- 1983 Cleethorpes Borough Council election
- 1987 Cleethorpes Borough Council election
- 1991 Cleethorpes Borough Council election
