= Cristal Global =

Cristal Global is the world's second-largest producer of titanium dioxide and a leading producer of titanium chemicals. It was formed when The National Titanium Dioxide Company Ltd. combined with Millennium Chemicals. The headquarters are in Jeddah, Saudi Arabia. It is a significant shareholder in Bemax, the world’s 5th largest TiO_{2} feedstock producer.

== Products ==
- Titanium Dioxide (TiO_{2}), using both the chloride and sulfate processes.
- Performance Chemicals
  - Specialty Titanium Dioxides (Ultrafine TiO_{2})
  - Titanium tetrachloride (TiCl_{4}) and related products
- Ferrica™
  - Gypsum
  - Hydrochloric acid
  - Copperas
  - Iron chlorosulfate
  - Carbon dioxide
  - Molten sulfur
  - Sulfuric acid
- Other
  - Chlorine
  - Caustic soda
  - Zircon
  - Ilmenite
  - Rutile
  - Sodium silicate

== Manufacturing plants ==
As of 2008, Cristal Global has eight manufacturing plants in 6 countries and on 5 continents.

- Yanbu, Saudi Arabia
- Bunbury, Australia
- Stallingborough, United Kingdom
- Thann, France
- Paraíba, Brazil (a mine site)
- Bahia, Brazil
- Ashtabula, OH United States
- Baltimore, MD United States

== Leadership ==
As of 2008 the company leadership is:

- Dr. Talal Al-Shair Chairman and CEO
- Moayed AlQurtas Vice Chairman
- Bader AlHamad Board Member
- Saleh AlNuzha Board Member
- Jamal Nahas President
- Abdalla Ibrahim Executive Vice President – Finance and Investments
- Thomas VanValkenburgh Executive Vice President - Commercial/Supply Chain
