= Ashby cum Fenby =

Village and civil parish in North East Lincolnshire, England

Coordinates: 53.488671°N 0.111030°W

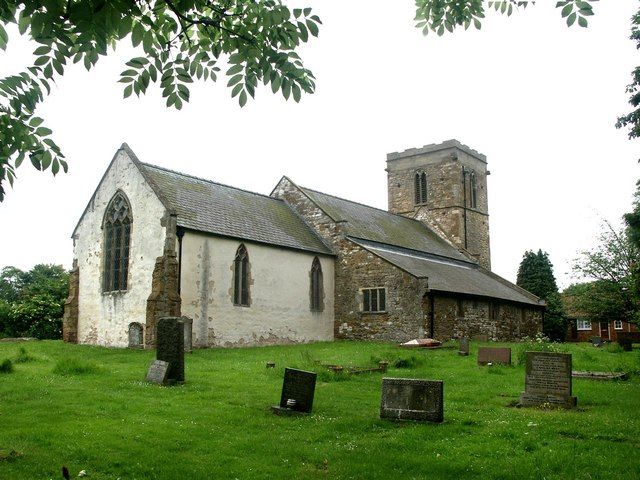
- Church of St Peter, Ashby cum Fenby

- Location within Lincolnshire
- Population: 249
- OS grid reference: TA254007
  - London: 153 mi (246 km) S
- Unitary authority: North East Lincolnshire
- Ceremonial county: Lincolnshire
- Region: Yorkshire and the Humber
- Country: England
- Sovereign state: United Kingdom
- Post town: Grimsby
- Postcode district: DN37
- Police: Humberside
- Fire: Humberside
- Ambulance: East Midlands
- UK Parliament: Brigg and Immingham

Ashby cum Fenby is a village and civil parish in North East Lincolnshire, England, approximately 5 miles (8 km) south from Grimsby, and just east of the A18 road.

In the 2001 census the population was recorded as 248, increasing marginally to 249 at the 2011 census.

In 1085 William the Conqueror ordered that a survey should take place across his kingdom to determine the amount of tax that was due. The survey took place in 1086 and the results were written down in what has become known as the Domesday Book. For each place there is a list of manors together with a summary of their assets. In 1086 Ashby cum Fenby was in the Hundred of Haverstoe in Lincolnshire. The village had three manors and 29 households which is considered to be quite large for that time.

Ashby cum Fenby Grade II* listed Anglican church is dedicated to St Peter. The church has an Early English tower, aisle and belfry, a Decorated chancel, and Perpendicular font. Beneath the tower are remaining parts of a 13th-century rood screen. In the north aisle are monuments to Sir William Wray (d. 1617) and his wife Frances (d. 1647), and to Susanna Drury, sister of Frances.
