= Millennium Chemicals =

Chemical company in Hunt Valley, Maryland, US

Millennium Inorganic Chemicals is a Hunt Valley, Maryland based chemical company.

The business was established in 1985. It was a subsidiary of British conglomerate Hanson plc at one time, but was demerged on 1 October 1996, when it became an independent listed company. It was taken over by Cristal Chemical Company in 2007, but continues to exist as a wholly owned subsidiary and trading name of Cristal.

Millennium Inorganic Chemicals (MIC) is the world’s second-largest producer of titanium dioxide and a leading producer of titanium chemicals. Cristal and MIC operate eight manufacturing plants in six countries and employ more than 3,500 people worldwide.

Manufacturing sites are in Baltimore, Maryland; Ashtabula, Ohio; Salvador, Brazil; Stallingborough, United Kingdom; Thann, France; Yanbu, Saudi Arabia; and Australind, Australia.
