= West Ravendale Priory =

- Location within Lincolnshire

General information
- Type: Priory
- Coordinates: 53.4795°N 0.1532°W
- Completed: 13th century
- Owner: Managed by English Heritage

West Ravendale Priory was a Premonstratensian priory in North East Lincolnshire, England and one of nine within the historical county. The site of the priory lies 7 miles (11 km) south-west of Grimsby, and 1 mile (1.6 km) west of the A18. Its previous position is defined by earthworks and rubble. The ruins are Grade II listed, and lie within the civil parish of East Ravendale.

The priory was founded in 1202 by Alan, son of Count Henry of Brittany, as a cell of the Premonstratensian abbey of Beauport in Brittany. Owing to wars with France it was taken into the possession of the English Crown, and was part of the dowry of Joan of Navarre, wife of Henry IV. After her death in 1437 the priory was assigned to the collegiate church of Southwell. The remains of the chapel of the priory survived into the early 20th century.
