= Healing School =

School in Lincolnshire

Healing School, A Science Academy

Location
- Low Road; Healing, Lincolnshire, DN41 7QD; England
- Coordinates: 53.5743°N 0.1634°W

Information
- Type: Academy
- Established: 1 September 2010
- Department for Education URN: 136277 Tables
- Ofsted: Reports
- Principal: Michelle Dewland
- Gender: Coeducational
- Age: 11 to 16
- Enrolment: 914
- Colours: Black, Green and Gold
- Website: Healing Science Academy

Healing School, A Science Academy is a co-educational secondary school and specialist academy located on Low Road in the village of Healing, North East Lincolnshire, England.

The school has a maximum capacity of 900 students. However, according to the 2019 Ofsted report it has a student enrolment of 914. Healing School serves the area of Healing and Stallingborough but the school has an intake from the Willows, Great Coates, Wybers Wood, Immingham, North Killingholme and other parts of Grimsby.

== History ==
The school was previously known as Healing School, A Specialist Science and Foundation College (Ofsted URN 118095). It converted to an academy in 2012 as part of Healing Multi Academy Trust.

== Ofsted judgements ==
As Healing Comprehensive School, the school was inspected in 1999 with the finding that "this is a good school".

As Healing School, A Specialist Science College, the school was inspected in 2006 with the judgement of Good, and in 2009 with the judgement of Outstanding. A staff member was invited to 10 Downing Street in 2018 to meet the prime minister in order to celebrate the school's outstanding teaching.

As of 2024, the school's most recent inspection was in 2022, with a judgement of Requires Improvement.

== Academic performance ==
In 1996 The Independent listed the school as one of the country's "outstandingly successful schools", based on inspection judgements and "doing well in all areas of their work".

In 2000 the percentage of pupils at the school who achieved five or more GCSEs at grades A* to C or the GNVQ equivalent was 69%, compared to 36% in North-East Lincolnshire and 49% in England.

In 2001 The Guardian listed the school as the 137th best comprehensive in the country, based on GCSE results.

In 2018 the school's GCSE results were above average. The percentage of pupils attaining Grade 5 or above in English and maths GCSEs was 51%, compared to 37% in North-East Lincolnshire and 40% in England. Attainment 8 and Progress 8 were also above average.

== Sports ==
A pupil won the under-15 long jump national title in 2017.

== Teaching School ==
The school is responsible for The Humber Teaching School.

== Notable former pupils ==
- Maxine Carr, convicted of providing a false alibi in the Soham murders case
- Ian Huntley, murderer of Holly Wells and Jessica Chapman in Soham in 2002
- Lia Nici, Conservative MP since 2019 for Great Grimsby; gained 3 O-levels in 1985
- Melanie Onn, Labour MP from 2015 to 2019 for Great Grimsby
- Sam Atkin, British Olympic athlete specialising in long-distance running, predominantly the 5000 metres and 10,000 m races
