= HLI =

HLI may refer to:

- Hacienda Luisita, a sugar plantation in the Philippines
- Healing railway station, in England
- Highland Light Infantry, a former regiment of the British Army
- Hollister Municipal Airport, in California, United States
- Human Life International, an American anti-abortion umbrella organization
- High Level Interface, a communications term = a type of connection that links data flows.
