= Waltham Windmill =

Windmill in Waltham, Lincolnshire, England

Coordinates: 53.5111°N 0.1021°W

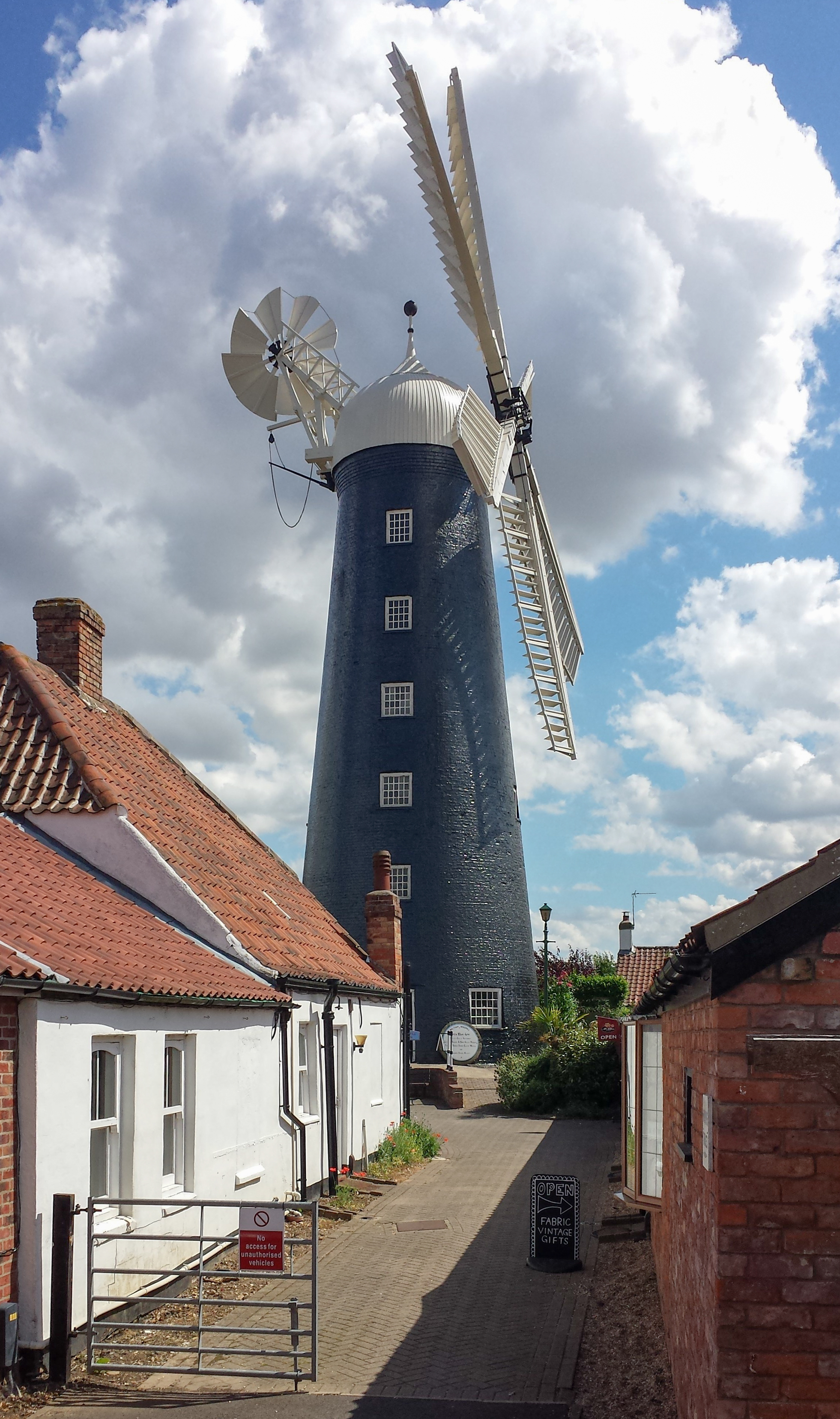
The windmill in 2013

Waltham Windmill is a six-sailed windmill located in the village of Waltham, five miles from Grimsby in North East Lincolnshire, England. It is renowned in the area for having all six sails still in full working capacity, being one of the few windmills like this in the United Kingdom.

== Construction ==
The first mill on this site was built in 1666 and was a trestle post mill. The location was well set on the Brigsley Road with good transport into Grimsby and out towards the farms of the Lincolnshire Wolds. This mill was blown down in 1744, but soon replaced with another post mill to continue the job of the old. Unfortunately for the residents of the area, this one suffered a similar fate, being blown down in 1873.

Construction of the one that stands today began in 1878 and was completed by water-colour painter John Saunderson from Louth, Lincolnshire in 1880. The new windmill was constructed of local brick and coated with a layer of tar as a seal against the elements. The six-storied mill had a greater capacity than the previous post mills and featured 6 double-sided sails, driving four pairs of grinding stones for the production of flour (two so-called greystones (peak stones, cut from rock of the Peak District) and two French quartzite stones).

== Later years ==
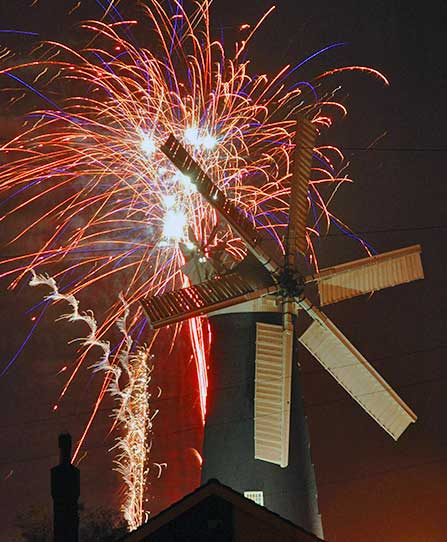
Waltham Windmill

In the 1920s, the sails were reconstructed to single-sided sails to increase its efficiency in light winds.

It is said that during World War II whilst RAF Grimsby was being constructed the Air Ministry saw the Windmill as a possible waypoint for German Bombers. They went to see the farmer who owned the mill and told him they would destroy it along with the Grimsby Dock Tower and Binbrook Windmill. The farmer then went to get his shotgun and chased them off his land and they only returned to construct the W.A.A.F. canteen. Grimsby Dock Tower survived due to it holding a Royal Navy wireless transmitter, however Binbrook Windmill was demolished.

By 1962, Waltham Windmill was one of the last windmills in England to be fully operational by wind, but from this point until 1967, it was powered by electricity.

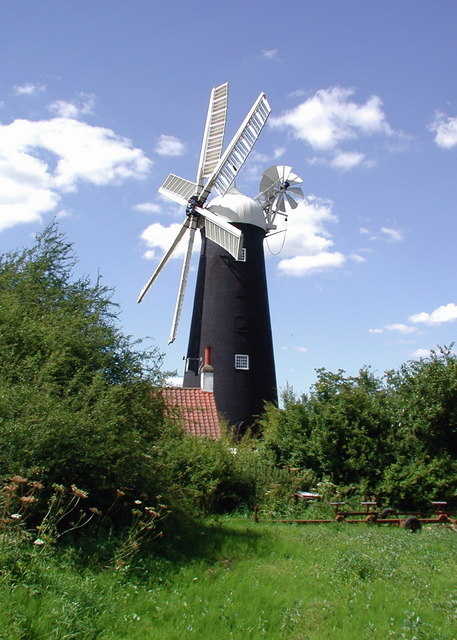
Waltham Mill

In 2001 the windmill cap and sails were removed for restoration and repaint. In 2013 the windmill was restored at a cost of £30,000.

In 2024, the cap and sails were again removed to enable significant restoration, part funded by a £163,120 grant from Historic England which added the mill to its "at risk" register. The mill was finally re-assembled in early 2026.

== The windmill today ==
The windmill itself is funded via the Waltham Windmill Preservation Society and the Waltham Windmill Trust. Various support events are held throughout the year, including an annual firework display. Within the grounds are a miniature railway, an exhibition dedicated to the RAF within the Rural Life museum, and a cafe.
