= Barnoldby le Beck =

Village and civil parish in North East Lincolnshire, England

Coordinates: 53.513128°N 0.12°W

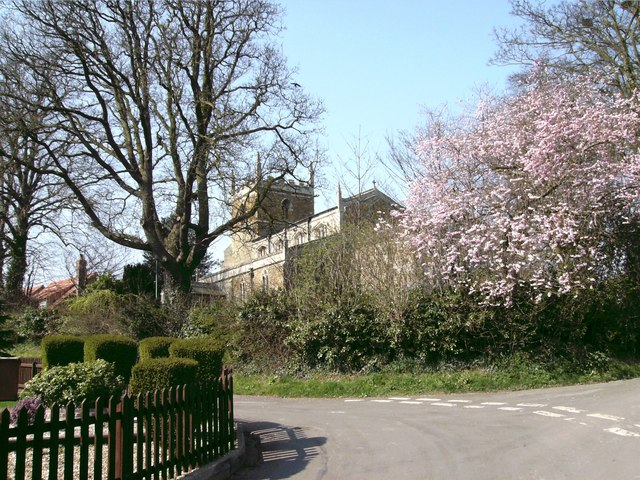
- Church of St Helen's

- Location within Lincolnshire
- Population: 346 (2011)
- OS grid reference: TA236032
  - London: 140 mi (230 km) S
- Civil parish: Barnoldby le Beck
- Unitary authority: North East Lincolnshire
- Ceremonial county: Lincolnshire
- Region: Yorkshire and the Humber
- Country: England
- Sovereign state: United Kingdom
- Post town: GRIMSBY
- Postcode district: DN37
- Dialling code: 01472
- Police: Humberside
- Fire: Humberside
- Ambulance: East Midlands
- UK Parliament: Brigg and Immingham

Barnoldby le Beck is a village and civil parish in North East Lincolnshire, England, It is situated just east of the A18 and is close to the village of Waltham and the town of Grimsby.

== Etymology ==
The name Barnoldby le Beck has origins in the Norse settlement of North East Lincolnshire. The affix by means a farm or settlement and is preceded by the modern phrasing of the personal name Bjǫrnulfr. While le beck reflects the Scandinavian word bekkr which means stream.

== History ==
In the Domesday Book of 1086, Barnoldby le Beck was a large village with 9 smallholders, 26 freeman, 12 ploughlands and a meadow of 200 acres. In 1066, the lord was Ralph the Staller, a constable of Edward the Confessor, and in 1086, the lord and tenant in chief was Alan Rufus.

Early land holders in the Middle Ages included the Abbot of Grimsby, John Yarborough and Geoffrey le Scrope.

Following the Enclosure of common lands in 1769 there were 12 landholders, including the Dashwood, Hewson and Bonsor families.

In 1820, the population of the village was 230, 232 in 1831, and in 1851 it was 269.

In 1855, the lord of the manor was B. Auningson and Miss Eleanor Tupling was the landlady of the Ship inn.

== Church of St Helen's ==
The earliest surviving parts of the church date to the 13th century, with later additions over the next 200 years. Renovations took place in 1839 and, by Ewan Christian, in 1892. In 1901–2, the porch and tower were rebuilt. A font bowl in the south aisle dates to the 11th or 12th century.

Following the English Civil War, Anthony Harewood, the Royalist rector of the church of St. Helen's, was replaced by a Puritan minister at the direction of the Earl of Manchester. The appointment of the new minister divided the village's inhabitants and some became early Quakers following a visit by a missionary for George Fox.

In 1855, the living of the rectory was in the gift of the Chapter of Southwell Collegiate church and worth £200. The incumbent at that time was Rev. H. M. Beecher. The village also had Primitive Methodist and Wesleyan chapels.

== Community ==
The population of the parish in the 2011 Census was 346 residents.

The village public house is the Ship Inn, situated on Main Road.

== Barnoldby Orange Miss ==
Osmond & Sons, farmers based in Barnoldby le Beck, were well known for their prize-winning herd of Herefords

Barnoldby Orange Miss, named for the village and bred here, was voted supreme champion Hereford Heifer at the Royal Smithfield Show in Earls Court, London and was presented to the Queen along with Ray Osmond on 7 December 1965.

== Notable people ==
- John Beecham, Methodist writer
- Andrew Osmond, diplomat and co-founder of Private Eye, was born here
- Rex Critchlow, architect

== Gallery ==
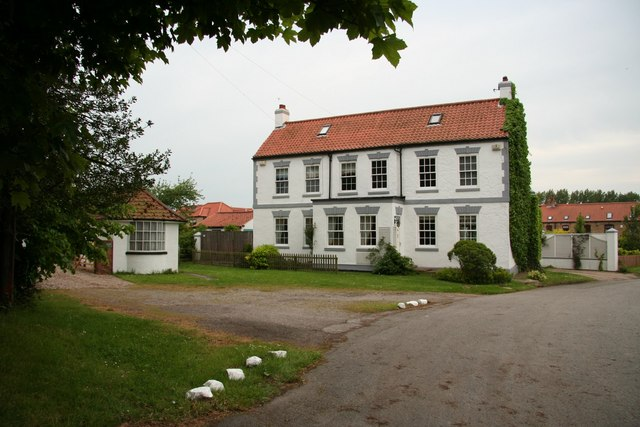
Old Manor House

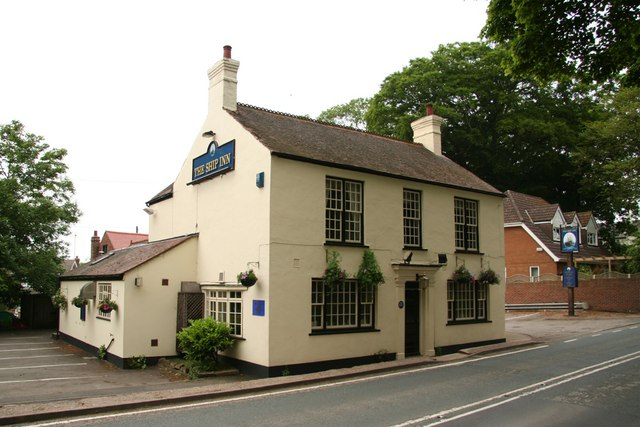
The Ship Inn

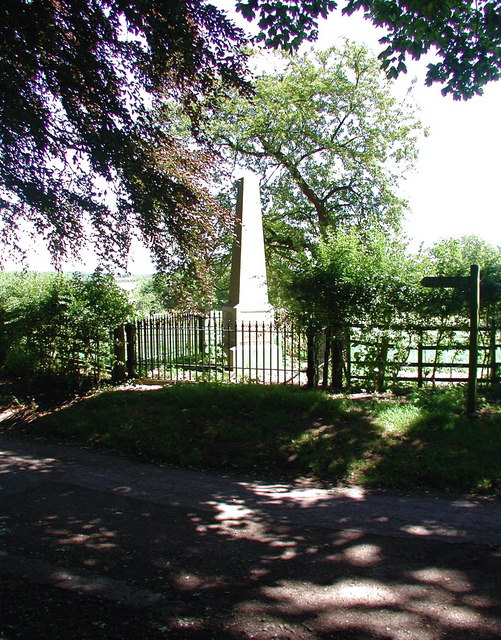
Memorial to William Smith

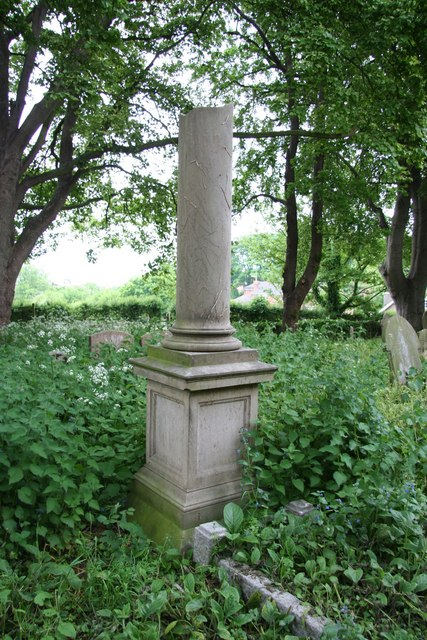
Memorial to Sarah Nainby

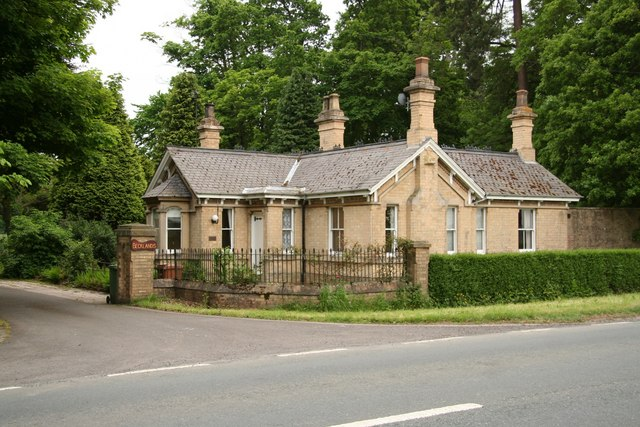
The Lodge, Becklands
