= East Ravendale =

Village in Lincolnshire, England

Coordinates: 53.478035°N 0.139054°W

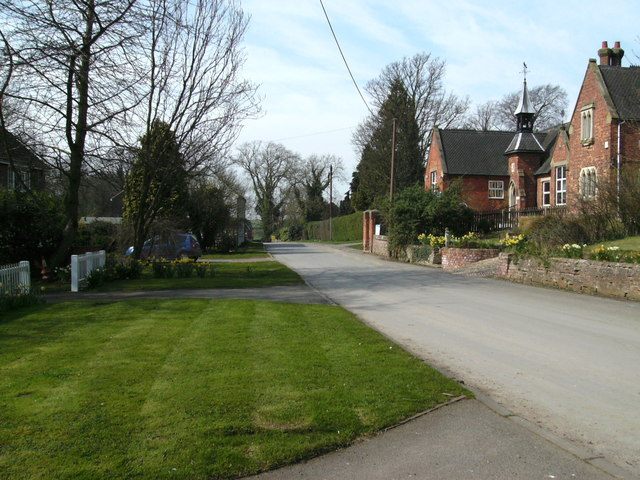
- East Ravendale

- Location within Lincolnshire
- Population: 187 (Including West Ravendale 2011)
- OS grid reference: TF236995
  - London: 135 mi (217 km) S
- Unitary authority: North East Lincolnshire
- Ceremonial county: Lincolnshire
- Region: Yorkshire and the Humber
- Country: England
- Sovereign state: United Kingdom
- Post town: Grimsby
- Postcode district: DN37
- Police: Humberside
- Fire: Humberside
- Ambulance: East Midlands
- UK Parliament: Brigg and Immingham

East Ravendale is a small village and civil parish in North East Lincolnshire, England. It is situated 6 miles (9.7 km) south-south-west from Grimsby, and 0.5 miles (0.8 km) west from the A18.

The village has a small school, a church, approximately twenty houses, and a postbox.

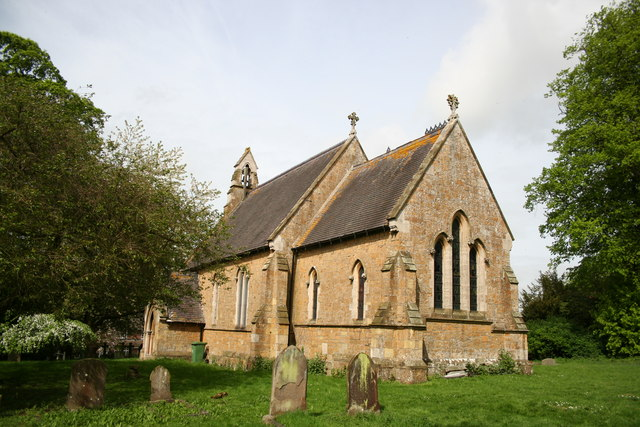
St.Martin's church

Both East Ravendale Primary School and the neighbouring Grade II listed St Martin's Church were designed by architect James Fowler in 1857, and were his first new-build school with church.

Three other buildings in the village are listed: early 18th-century East Ravendale Hall, 19th-century Parkside farmhouse, and 17th-century thatched cottages.

West Ravendale, the site of the ruins of Ravendale Priory, lies 0.5 miles (0.8 km) to the west and is part of East Ravendale civil parish.
