= Healing, Lincolnshire =

Village in Lincolnshire, England

Healing
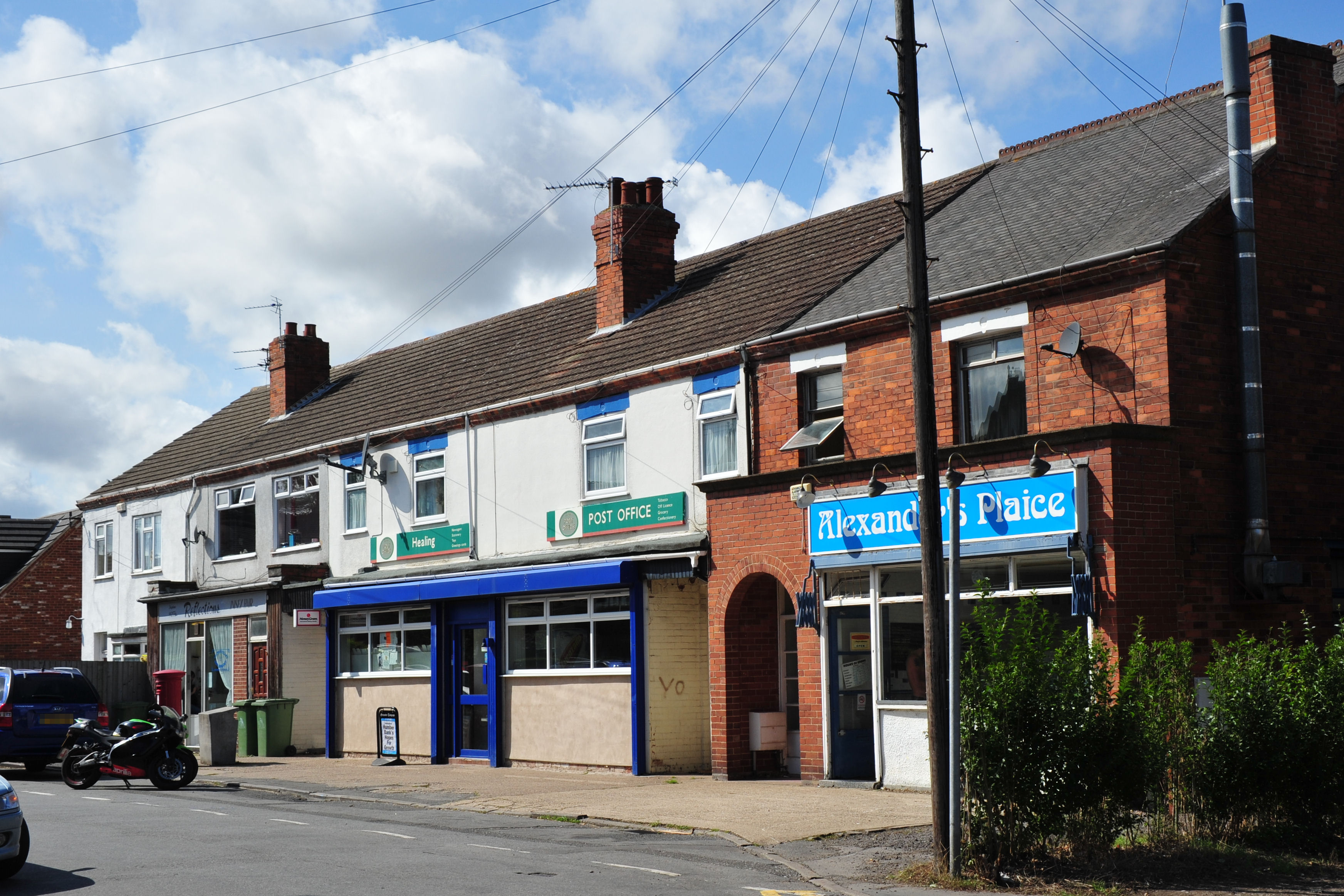
- Shops in Healing village (2010)

- Location within Lincolnshire
- Population: 2,940 (2011 Census)
- OS grid reference: TA216101
  - London: 145 mi (233 km) S
- Unitary authority: North East Lincolnshire
- Ceremonial county: Lincolnshire
- Region: Yorkshire and the Humber
- Country: England
- Sovereign state: United Kingdom
- Post town: Grimsby
- Postcode district: DN41
- Dialling code: 01472
- Police: Humberside
- Fire: Humberside
- Ambulance: East Midlands
- UK Parliament: Brigg and Immingham

Healing is a village and civil parish in North East Lincolnshire, England. It is situated between Stallingborough and Great Coates, and 3 miles (5 km) west from Grimsby.

The village dates from at least the early medieval period, but later contracted to a few habitations. Healing railway station opened on 1 April 1881, and in the late 1800s/early 1900s the village expanded. The parish was once known as the site of a healing spring.

Outside the village there are no significant habitations in the parish. A large textile fibre plant was constructed by Courtaulds near the Humber bank in the late 1950s, and near the boundary with Great Coates a large industrial estate, Europarc, was established in the 1990s.

== History ==
Human activity in the area dates from at least the Roman Britain period: there is archaeological evidence south-west of the village of an Iron Age enclosure complex, showing multiple periods of use.

Healing was a manor at the time of the Domesday Book, in which it is referenced three times, as "Hegelinge", "Hechelinge", and "Heghelinge". The medieval village is thought to have diminished in size at some period in its history.

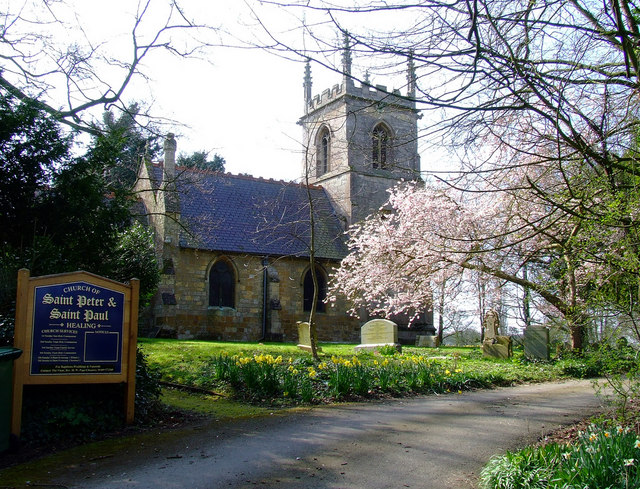
St. Peter and St. Paul (2009)

The parish church of St Peter and St Paul dates from the 13th century. The upper parts of the bell tower are in the Decorated Gothic style and ashlar faced. The church was partly rebuilt in 1840, and underwent a Victorian restoration in 1876 by Fowler of Louth, who added a new roof and windows and rebuilt its south side. Within the churchyard is a listed 14th- or 15th-century cross base. The church is a Grade II listed building.

Healing Manor (or Healing Hall) was begun in the early 18th century, and is thought to have been a replacement for an earlier manor house. Remains of the former manor exist as moats, one of which has been incorporated into the gardens of the modern Hall.

Healing railway station and the Great Grimsby and Sheffield Junction Railway opened in 1848, north of the village, with a short Cattle Dock on the south side of the station.

In the Victorian period two springs were known in the parish close by each other, one fresh water, the other chalybeate, which were said to be efficacious in curing skin disorders. (53.56963°N 0.19081°W) This led some to claim that the parish's name had its origin in the curative waters.

The population of the parish in 1821 was 94, and was 102 around 1872. In 1885 Kelly's Directory noted that the parish area was 1,296 acres (524.5 ha), farmed on the four field system. Around 1887 the village consisted of the church, the Manor House, a rectory, three fairly substantial detached dwellings (Healing House (later Healing Manor cottages), Ivy House and Healing Rookery) and a few other buildings. The remainder of the parish was mainly empty, enclosed fields, apart from Wadd Farm and Woad Farm north of the village, and Healing Wells farm to the south-west. Parts of Healing Wells farm are now listed structures. Between 1890 and 1910 a yard was built north of the railway station, for the export of watercress.

=== 20th century ===
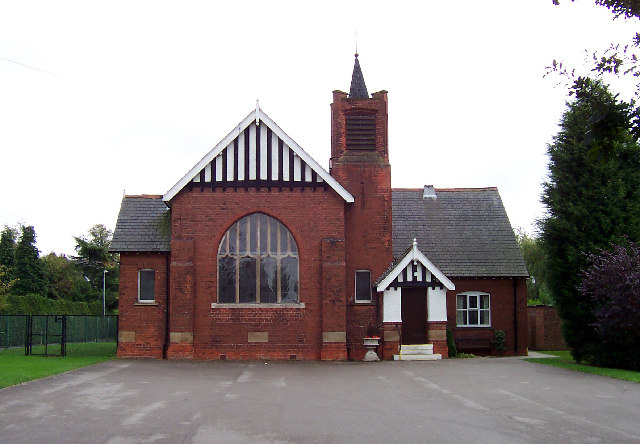
Healing Methodist church, 1906 (2005)

By the beginning of the 20th century some linear housing development had begun, along the parallel Station Road and The Avenue which ran roughly north towards the railway station. A Methodist chapel had also been established, built 1906 in the Arts and Crafts style. Additionally watercress beds had been established near the station. The Grimsby and Immingham Electric Railway was built through the northern part of the parish in 1912.

By 1930 further housing had been built, including side streets off Station Road and The Avenue, as well as west of the traditional village centre along Stallingborough Road. Further housing expansion occurred in the second half of the 20th century, with an estate built to the east of 'The Avenue'. The northern yard was closed in the inter-war years, however the Cattle Dock remained.

After the Second World War, the south bank of the Humber Estuary was industrially developed; in the parish of Healing a Courtaulds textile fibre plant was established. The A180 road was built in the 1970s, and passes through the parish. In 1992 an extension of Ciba-Geigy's Grimsby plant resulted in the construction of a combined heat and power plant on the west of their site within Healing parish.

In the north-east of the parish, on the A180/A1136, a large industrial park, Europarc, was established by developers Wykeland. By 2013 46 acres (19 ha) remained to be developed, with approximately 2000 people employed at the estate. As of 2014 the 110 acres (45 ha) development had 725,000 square feet (67,400 m^{2}) of building space developed.

The village was expanded west by a new housing estate (Wisteria Drive estate) in around 2001. In 2012 an estate of 42 houses was given planning permission.

== Geography ==
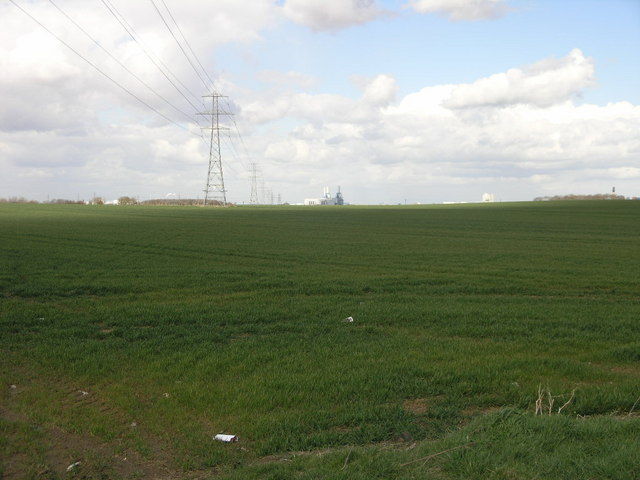
View north across the parish (2006)

Healing is bounded by the civil parishes of Great Coates to the east, Aylesby to the south-east, Riby to the south-west, and Stallingborough to the west, with the Oldfleet Drain forming much of the western boundary. To the north-east the parish is bounded by the Humber Estuary.

An industrial freight line to Immingham Docks (the former Grimsby and Immingham Electric Railway), the A180 road, and the Barton Line (the former Great Grimsby and Sheffield Junction Railway, est.1845) run through the parish parallel to the foreshore (in order from north to south). Healing is served by Healing railway station (Barton line) on the northern edge of the village, and connected to the road network by the B1210 to the south.

Much of the parish is low-lying agricultural land drained by man-made drains. North of Healing village the height above sea level does not exceed 5 metres (16 ft); south of Healing are minor high points of around 20 metres (66 ft) elevation.

In the north of the parish, adjacent to the river bank, are the Lenzing Tencel plant and the associated 48 MW Cofely-owned Humber Energy CHP plant.

Healing's population at the 2001 Census was 2,606, increasing to 2,940 at the 2011 census.

The Winner of the 1845 Grand National Steeplechase, Cure-All was prepared for the race at Healing Manor, which is today a Hotel, with a lounge named in honour of the horse.

== Community ==
The village has a post office and a number of shops. Transport connections include Healing railway station on the Barton-Cleethorpes Line, the B1210 road, and a local bus service.

Healing has two schools, Healing Primary School and Healing Comprehensive, as well as a Nursery and Out Of School Club.

There are two local men's football teams, and a junior football team, the Healing Hotspurs.

== Gallery ==
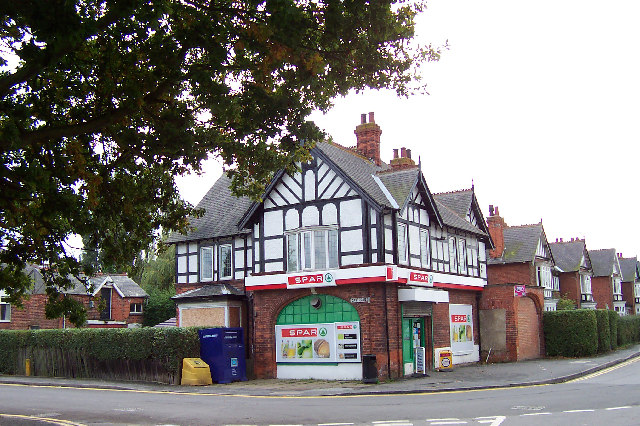
Spar Shop (shut down), Healing village (2005)

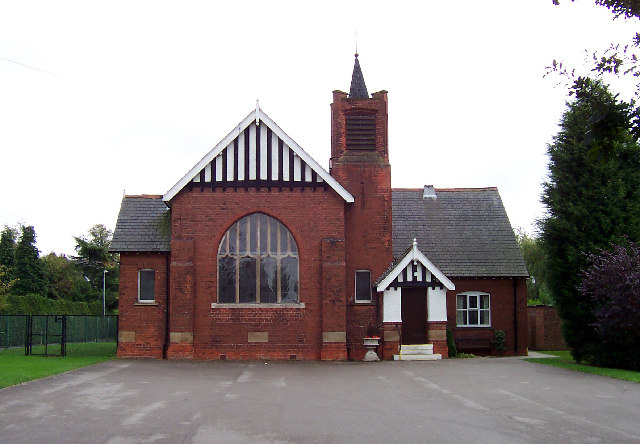
Methodist Church, Healing village (2005)

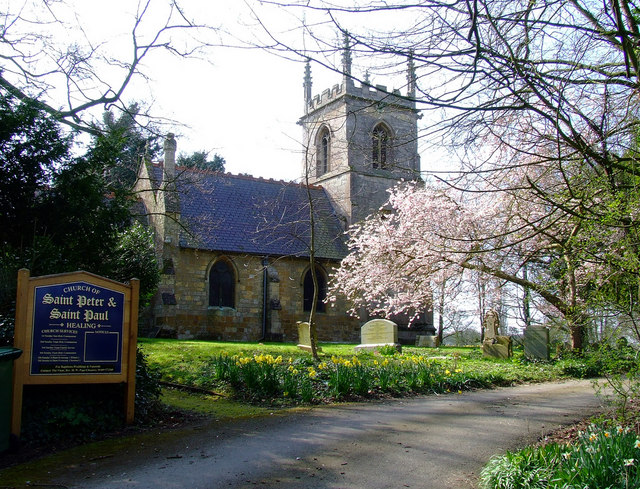
St. Peter and St. Paul, Healing village (2009)

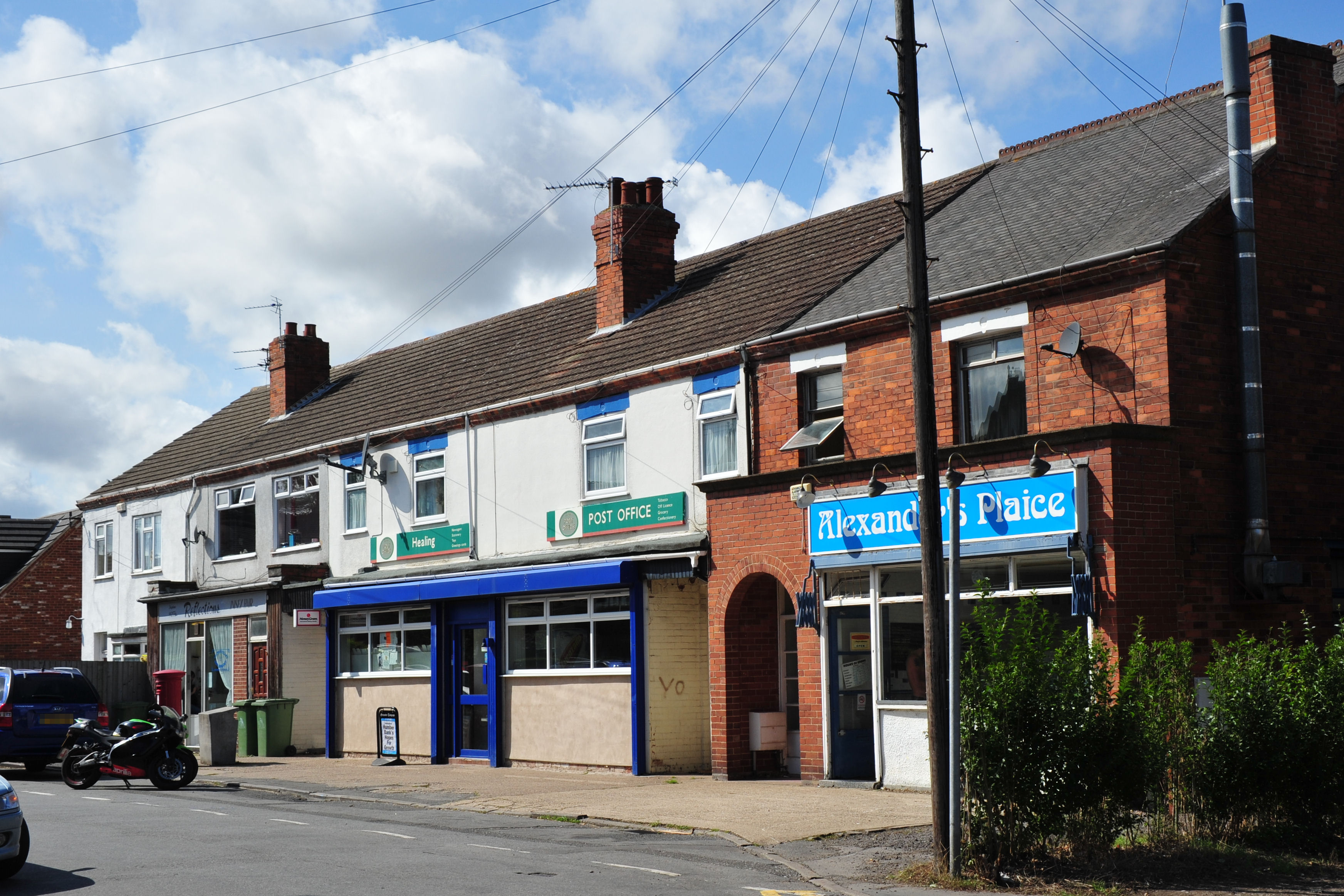
Shops, Healing village (2010)

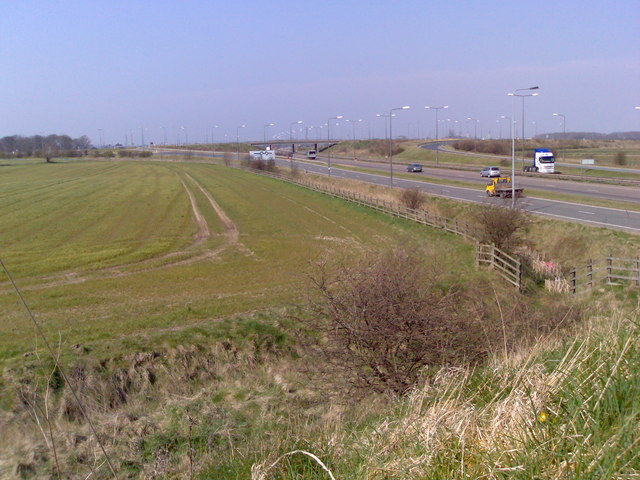
A180 / A1136 junction (2007)

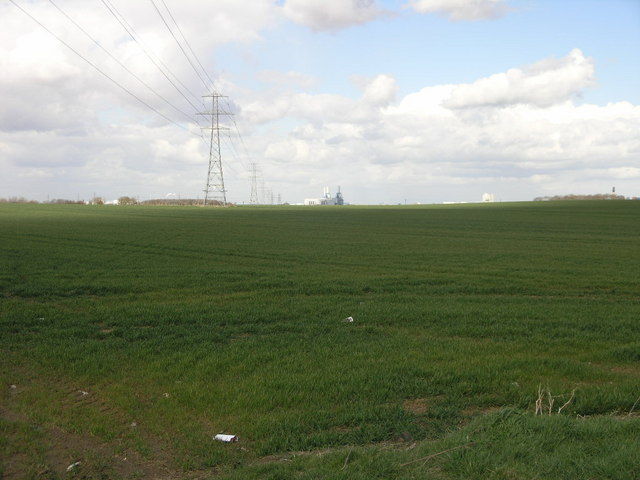
View north across the parish (2006)
