= Aylesby =

Village and civil parish in North East Lincolnshire, England

Coordinates: 53.551728°N 0.184985°W

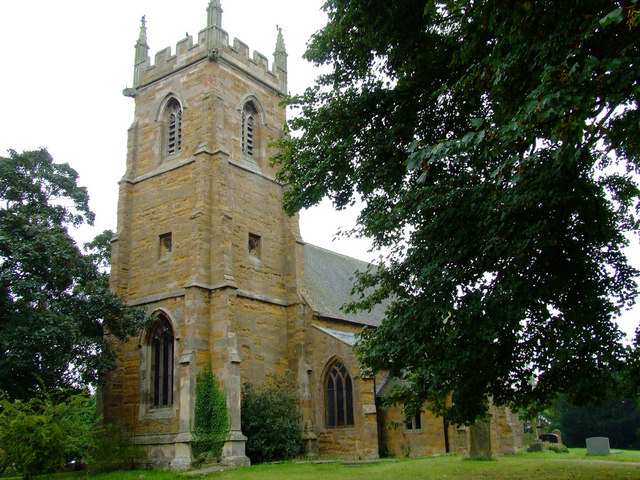
- Church of St Lawrence, Aylesby

- Location within Lincolnshire
- Population: 155
- OS grid reference: TA203076
  - London: 140 mi (230 km) S
- Unitary authority: North East Lincolnshire
- Ceremonial county: Lincolnshire
- Region: Yorkshire and the Humber
- Country: England
- Sovereign state: United Kingdom
- Post town: Grimsby
- Postcode district: DN37
- Police: Humberside
- Fire: Humberside
- Ambulance: East Midlands
- UK Parliament: Brigg and Immingham

Aylesby is a village and civil parish in North East Lincolnshire, England. It is situated near the A18 road, approximately 4 miles (6 km) west from Cleethorpes and north of Laceby. The population at the 2001 census was 135, increasing to 155 at the 2011 Census.

== History ==
The village's name in 1086 was Alesbi, and A.D. Mills in A Dictionary of British Place Names, gives its meaning as a 'farmstead or village of a man called Áli’.

Aylesby has three entries in the Domesday Book and comprised 36 households with a tax assessment of 3.7 geld units.

A Post mill in Aylesby was operated by the Cistercians of Meaux Abbey, East Riding of Yorkshire, during the Middle Ages. Around 1300, the Cistercians gave the mill to the Austin Canons of Wellow Abbey, Grimsby.

In the east of the village are six Grade II* listed almshouses, built in 1925, in memory of F.W. McAulay who was killed during the First World War at Fonquervillers, France, on 21 May 1916.

In 1950, Major Harry Spilman, of Aylesby Manor, held the position of High Sheriff of Lincolnshire.

== St Lawrence's Church ==
Aylesby Grade I listed Anglican church is dedicated to St Lawrence. It has a Decorative chancel and Perpendicular tower. Its arcades to the nave, with circular bench tables around the piers, and font, are Early English. Simon de Luda was appointed rector in 1278 and, after his death, in early 1306, he was buried near the south door of the church. In the pavement of the church is a slab to rector John Martin (d. 1352). The pews were hand crafted in 1759 by James Harrison of Middle Rasen, brother of clockmaker John Harrison. The church is surrounded by three large sycamore trees and a large copper beech tree on the Southern curtilage.

== Agriculture ==
From the mid-1700s, the manor farm was known for its English Leicester sheep. In 1848, the farm was purchased by William Torr and, under his management, 'the Aylesby flocks and herds were sent to all parts of the United Kingdom and to the continent, the colonies, and even Japan'.

The village lies in a small vale. At each side of Aylesby are two farms: one to the east on the road to Great Coates, the other to the west on Nooking Lane; both farms cover the countryside surrounding the village. Towards the east fields give way to the fishing port of Grimsby; towards the west arable land rises to the Lincolnshire Wolds.
