= Waltham, Lincolnshire =

Village in Lincolnshire, England

Coordinates: 53.516483°N 0.102071°W

Waltham
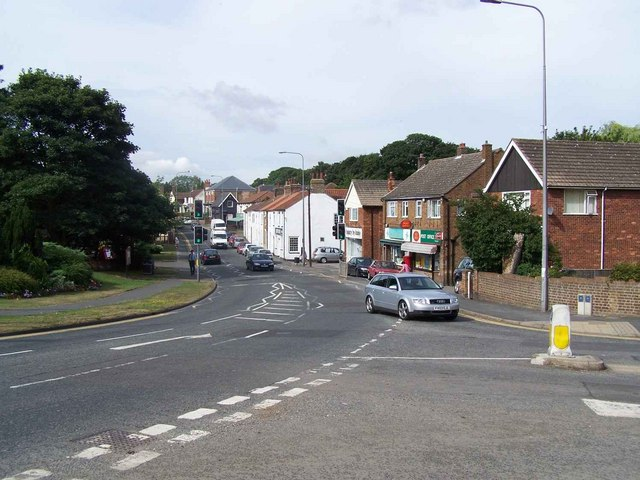
- Waltham Village

- Location within Lincolnshire
- Population: 6,413 (2011)
- OS grid reference: TA259038
  - London: 140 mi (230 km) S
- Civil parish: Waltham
- Unitary authority: North East Lincolnshire
- Ceremonial county: Lincolnshire
- Region: Yorkshire and the Humber
- Country: England
- Sovereign state: United Kingdom
- Post town: GRIMSBY
- Postcode district: DN37
- Police: Humberside
- Fire: Humberside
- Ambulance: East Midlands
- UK Parliament: Brigg and Immingham

Waltham is a village and civil parish in North East Lincolnshire, England. It is 4 miles (6 km) south of Grimsby close to the suburb of Scartho and to the smaller villages of Brigsley, Barnoldby-le-Beck, and Holton le Clay. Less than 2 miles (3 km) to the east-north-east is the village of New Waltham. In the 2001 census, Waltham had a population of 6,420, reducing slightly to 6,413 at the 2011 census.

== History ==
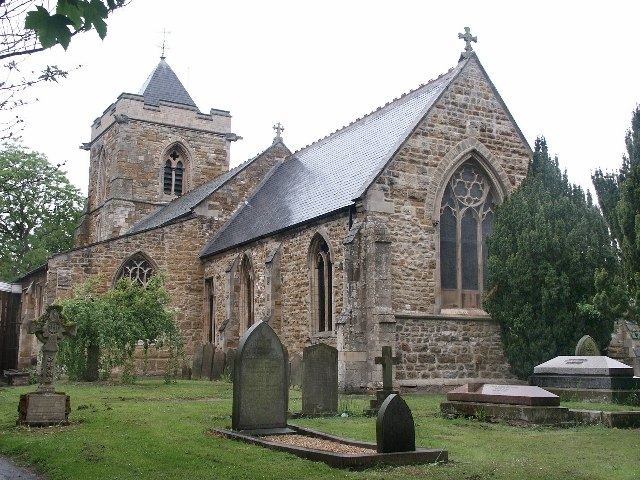
All Saints, Waltham

There was a substantial Saxon settlement on the site of the first village, and artifacts show earlier Roman occupation. The Waltham name is of Saxon origin: Walt refers to woodland or an area of high forest and Ham to either an estate or a village. Saxons may have changed the name from the Old English 'Wealdhant' which had the same meaning; the first part Ald, prefixed by We, meant "settlement", and Hant a "wooded estate".

Elizabeth Shaw, who is said to have lived to age 117, was born on 22 April 1683 at Waltham. A life portrait of her by R. Sheardown was published in 1800.

== Governance ==
Waltham is part of the Brigg and Immingham parliamentary constituency.

Waltham Ward is part of North East Lincolnshire Council, and covers the villages of Waltham, Brigsley and Ashby-cum-Fenby. It is one of the safest Conservative wards on the council and has been represented by Conservative councillors since the ward's creation in 2003.

Current elected councillors:

- Cllr Nick Pettigrew
- Cllr Philip Jackson

== Landmarks ==
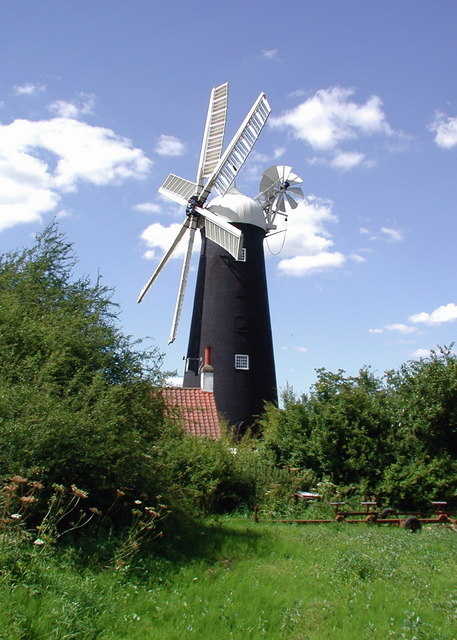
Waltham Mill

Waltham's landmarks include Waltham Windmill, which is used as the symbol for the village's Infant and Junior schools. The windmill was originally built in 1666, but was blown down several times. It was last re-built in 1873.

The village has three public houses, The Kings Head, the Tilted Barrel and the Tea Gardens. A branch of the Royal British Legion is also based in Waltham.

There is a cenotaph where a remembrance service is held each Remembrance Sunday.

Nearby is the former Second World War bomber airfield RAF Grimsby, which was originally Grimsby Municipal Airport. After the start of the Second World War the airport was re-constructed by the Air Ministry and became home to 142 Squadron, and later to 100 and 550 Squadrons, before closing in 1945. A museum at the Waltham Windmill houses a section dedicated to RAF Grimsby.

There was once a Waltham railway station (actually in New Waltham) on the East Lincolnshire Railway line (now closed) between Grimsby and Louth.

== Notable people ==
- Joanne Clifton, professional dancer on BBC TV's Strictly Come Dancing, and her brother and fellow pro Kevin Clifton
