= Brigsley =

Village and civil parish in North East Lincolnshire, England

Coordinates: 53.499622°N 0.110715°W

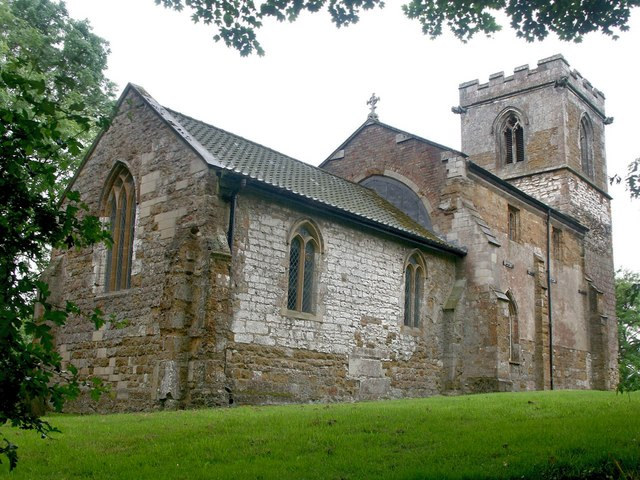
- St Helen's Church, Brigsley

- Location within Lincolnshire
- Population: 355 (2011)
- OS grid reference: TA254019
  - London: 140 mi (230 km) S
- Unitary authority: North East Lincolnshire
- Ceremonial county: Lincolnshire
- Region: Yorkshire and the Humber
- Country: England
- Sovereign state: United Kingdom
- Post town: Grimsby
- Postcode district: DN37
- Police: Humberside
- Fire: Humberside
- Ambulance: East Midlands
- UK Parliament: Brigg and Immingham

Brigsley is a village and civil parish in North East Lincolnshire, England, and on the B1203 road, 1 mile (1.6 km) south from Waltham.

According to the 2001 census its population was 370, reducing to 355 at the 2011 Census.

Brigsley Grade II listed Anglican parish church is dedicated to St Helen. It is 11th century with later additions, 1796 alterations, and 19th and 20th century restorations. It has a Norman tower with an Early English nave and chancel.
