= Great Coates =

Village and civil parish in North East Lincolnshire, England

Coordinates: 53.572083°N 0.143928°W

- Village and civil parish
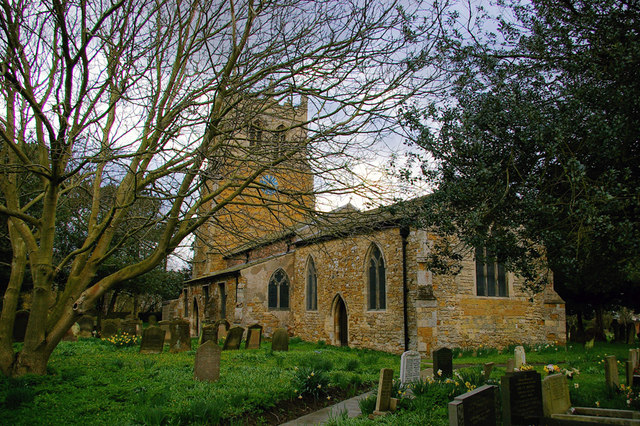
- Church of St Nicolas, Great Coates

- Location within Lincolnshire
- Area: 2.13 km^{2} (0.82 sq mi)
- Population: 1,464 (2011 census)
  - Density: 687/km^{2} (1,780/sq mi)
- OS grid reference: TA230099
  - London: 125 mi (201 km) S
- Unitary authority: North East Lincolnshire
- Ceremonial county: Lincolnshire
- Region: Yorkshire and the Humber
- Country: England
- Sovereign state: United Kingdom
- Post town: Grimsby
- Postcode district: DN37
- Dialling code: 01472
- Police: Humberside
- Fire: Humberside
- Ambulance: East Midlands
- UK Parliament: Great Grimsby and Cleethorpes

Great Coates is a village and civil parish in North East Lincolnshire, England. It is to the north-west and adjoins the Grimsby urban area, and is served by Great Coates railway station.

The northern part of the parish extends to the Humber Estuary foreshore, and includes the chemical plants of Ciba, Grimsby and Tioxide, Grimsby.

== Geography ==
The modern parish of Great Coates consists of a narrow strip of land around Woad Lane/Station Road running southwest–northeast with Great Coates railway station at the approximate centre. Northeast of the strip, on the far side of the A180 road the parish expands to include the Moody Lane industrial estate, and the industrial plants of Novartis and the former Tioxide plant. (Note: The Great Coates Industrial Estate, also known as Pyewipe Industrial Estate, developed from the 1960s lies outside the parish. (see also Industry of the South Humber Bank))

The land around Station Road and Woad Lane is in residential use, whilst the remainder of the parish is predominately industrial. The three main transport routes to Immingham – the industrial freight line to Immingham Docks (former Grimsby and Immingham Electric Railway), the Barton Line (former Great Grimsby and Sheffield Junction Railway, est.1845), and the A180 road – pass through the parish. Urban and industrial development has made Great Coates essentially contiguous with the town of Grimsby; the Grimsby suburbs of The Willows and Wybers Wood lie to the southeast and south respectively. To the west the land is mostly open countryside, in the civil parish of Healing.

At the 2001 Census Great Coates had a population of 1,111, increasing to 1,464 at the 2011 Census.

== History ==
A human habitation at Great Coates dates to at least the 11th century: Great Cotes (as Cotes) is mentioned as a manor in the Domesday Book, and in four associated entries. The manor included a church, mill, and 300 acre meadow. Taxed at 1.3 gelds, the manor comprised 6 villagers, 10 freemen and a priest.

The Church of St Nicolas dates to around 1200 AD and was extended in the 13th century. Aisles and the chancel were added in the 1300s, the tower in the 14th or 15th century and, in the late 1700s, the clerestory and north aisle window were added. Restoration work took place in 1865, by James Fowler and, between 1929 and 1930, there were repairs to the roof and a new east window, with work undertaken by W. and L. Bond. The clockface, to the east, was made by Thwaites & Reed, and it dates to 1806. The rectory to the church dates to the late Georgian period.

There was a medieval manor at the south end of the village, now evidenced by remains of the manorial moat. John Sandale, Chancellor of the Exchequer and Bishop of Winchester, held the manor of Great Coates and was granted Free warren there in 1313; Sandale's grant was 'to his heirs for ever' (et heredes sui imperpetuum). (Note: ".. Sciatis nos concessisse, et hac carta nostra confirmasse dilecto clerico nostro, Johanni de Sandale, quod ipse et heredes sui imperpetuum habeant liberam warennam in omnibus dominicis terris suis de Magna Cotes, in Comitatu Lincolnie; dum, tamen, terre ille non sint infra metas foreste nostre; ita quod nullus intret terras illas ad fugandum in eis, vel ad aliquid capiendum quod ad warennam pertineat, sine licencia ipsius Johannis, vel heredum suorum, super forisfacturam nostram decern librarum. Quare volumus et firmiter precipimus, pro nobis et heredibus nostris, quod predictus Johannes et heredes sui habeant liberam warennam in omnibus dominicis terris predictis; dum tamen, etc. [..] ipsum Regem." (see Baigent 1897, p. 303)) Also granted in 1313 was the right to the manor's 'wreckage of the sea and all animals called waifs, found within the said manor' (wreccam maris et animalia que dicuntur waifes, in manerio suo predicto). (Note: ".. Sciatis nos de gracia nostra concessisse, et hac carta nostra confirmasse dilecto clerico nostro, Johanni de Sandale, quod ipse et heredes sui imperpetuum habeant in manerio suo de Magna Cotes, cum pertinenciis, in Comitatu Lincolnie, wreccam maris, et animalia qui dicuntur waifes. Quare volumus et firmiter precipimus, pro nobis et heredibus nostris, quod predictus Johannes et heredes sui imperpetuum habeant wreccam maris et animalia que dicuntur waifes, in manerio suo predicto, cum pertinenciis, sicut predictum est. [...] xviij die Octobris. Per ipsum Regem." (see Baigent 1897, p. 303)) In October 1697 antiquary Abraham de la Pryme recorded the moated site in Great Coates as containing a brick built religious house, with "turrits like the old buildings, and somewhat in the walls of the gaithouse, which seems to have been niches for images, tho' now bricked up".

In 1821, the parish of Great Coates comprised 171 residents and 46 houses, (Note: Several buildings from around this period are listed, all built of red brick: Manor Farmhouse from the mid-18th century with later alterations; Cordeaux House, Cooks Lane, an estate house dating from 1820; The Grange farmhouse, Rose Cottage, Station Road, as well as four estate houses on Cooks Lane all dating from the early 19th century with later additions or alterations.) in c. 1837 36 houses and 237 residents. The Great Grimsby and Sheffield Junction Railway was constructed c. 1845, and Great Coates railway station was built in 1848. (Note: A branch line, Great Coates Branch, to the Old Dock was opened 1879, connecting with the railway line east of Great Coates station, east of the modern civil parish. The dock branch junction was moved west to near the River Freshney (West Marsh junction) in the early 1900s and the old junction abandoned.)

In c. 1887 the village consisted of the church, rectory (early 19th century, now The Old Rectory), a Wesleyan chapel, and around 20 dwellings including the substantial manor house (c. 1878), and Great Coates House, as well as with the station less than 1/2 mile northeast of the traditional centre (church and manor site). Outside the village the parish was rural, with enclosed fields and drainage channels, with no other habitations of any significance, excluding Pyewipe farm to the northeast.

This development in the parish was mostly unchanged until 1950: the Grimsby and Immingham Electric Railway which passed through the northern part of the parish opened 1912; and terraced housing was built on Woad Lane north and south of the station in the early part of the century. Additionally a biscuit factory (Watmough and Sons Ltd) had been established east of Woad Road, and north of the railway line by the 1930s. (Note: Outside the boundary of the modern (2001) civil parish) Watmough became part of Scribbans and Kemp in 1948 (later known as Kemps Biscuits, and later became part of United Biscuits).

United Biscuits closed its factory in 1995, which then employed several hundred people.

Today the original factory and site is owned by HSH Coldstores who has developed and modernised the site into a cold storage facility officially known as HSH Coldstores Lewis Howard Avenue. (Lewis Howard Avenue is the name of an internal access road built on the site in 2015).

After the Second World War the Humber Estuary bank between Grimsby and Immingham was industrialised. (See Industry of the South Humber Bank) British Titan Products (later BTP Tioxide, closed c. 2009) and CIBA Laboratories established large chemical plants in 1949 and 1951 in the northern part of the parish, adjacent to the estuary (see Ciba, Grimsby, and Tioxide, Grimsby) The A180 road was built in the 1970s, and passes through the parish.

In 1968 Great Coates parish was absorbed into Grimsby. The urban spread of Grimsby reached Great Coates village by the 1980s with The Willows housing estate, and industrial estate development reaching the eastern edge of the village; the Wybers Wood estate had been built to adjoining the south of the village by the end of the 20th century. By the 1990s development of Grimsby had begun to extend beyond Great Coates, with the development of Grimsby's Europarc.

In 2003 Great Coates was restored as a parish from Grimsby.

In 2013 two people were killed at Great Coates level crossing when their car was hit by a train. The inquest reported that the driver ignored the crossing warning light and attempted to drive around the barriers; the inquest heard that the driver's judgement may have been impaired by cannabis use.

== Gallery ==
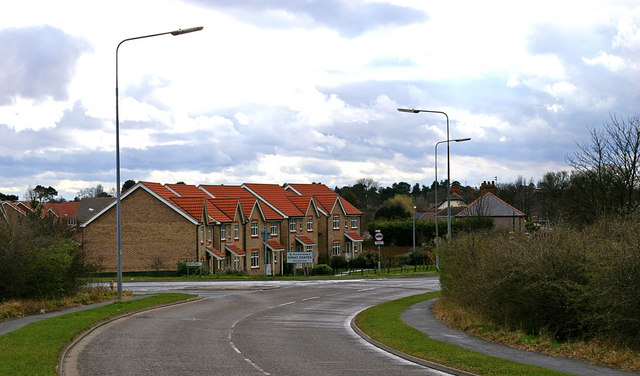
Housing, Woad Lane (2006)

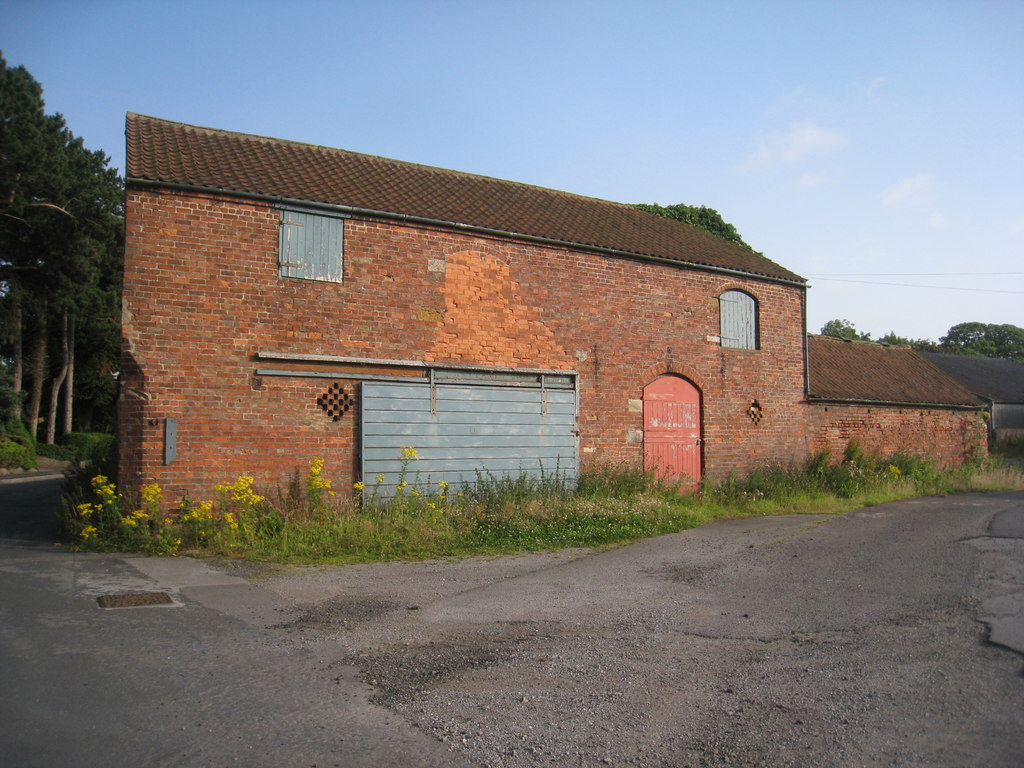
Buildings, Church farm (2011)

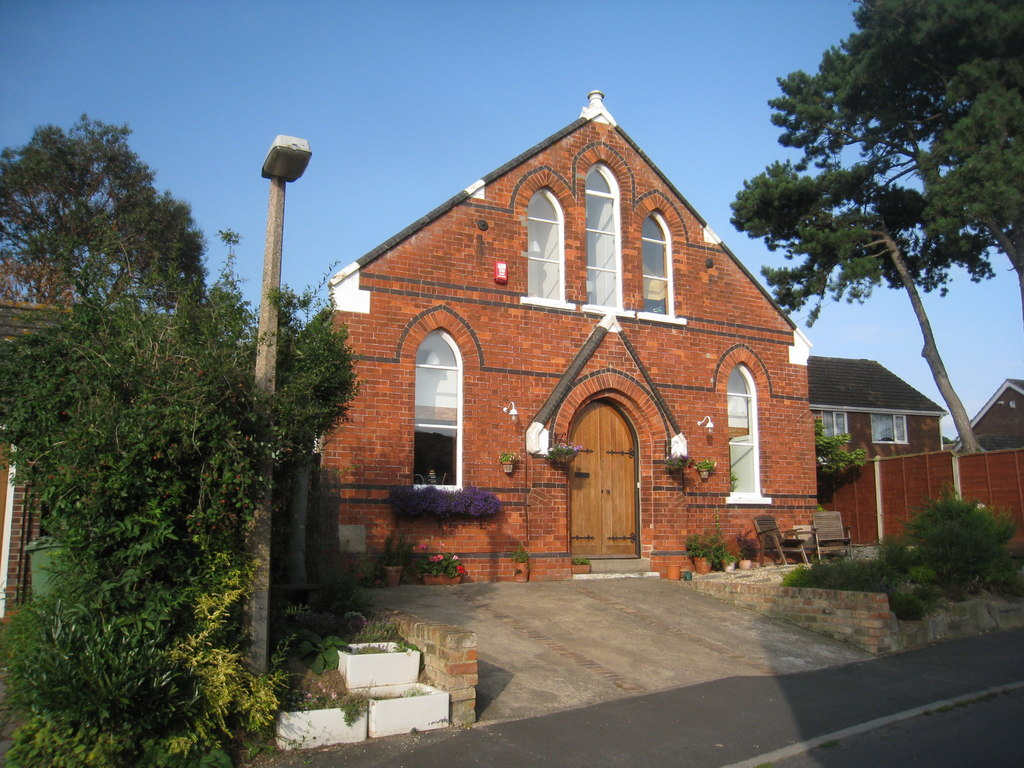
Methodist chapel (2011)

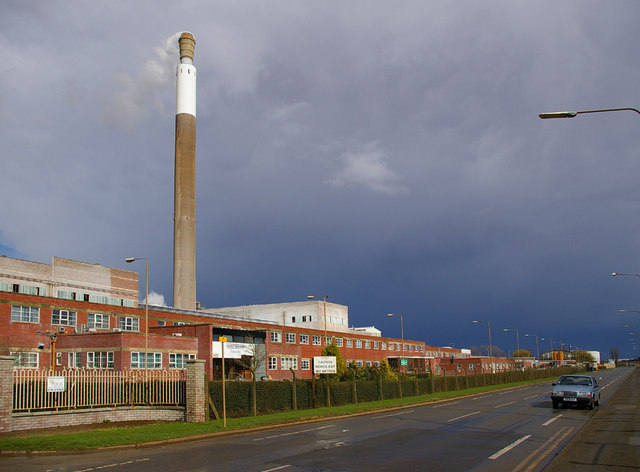
Tioxide plant (2006)

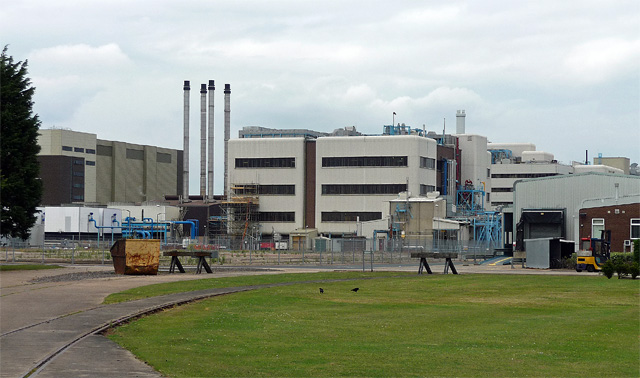
Novartis factory (2011)

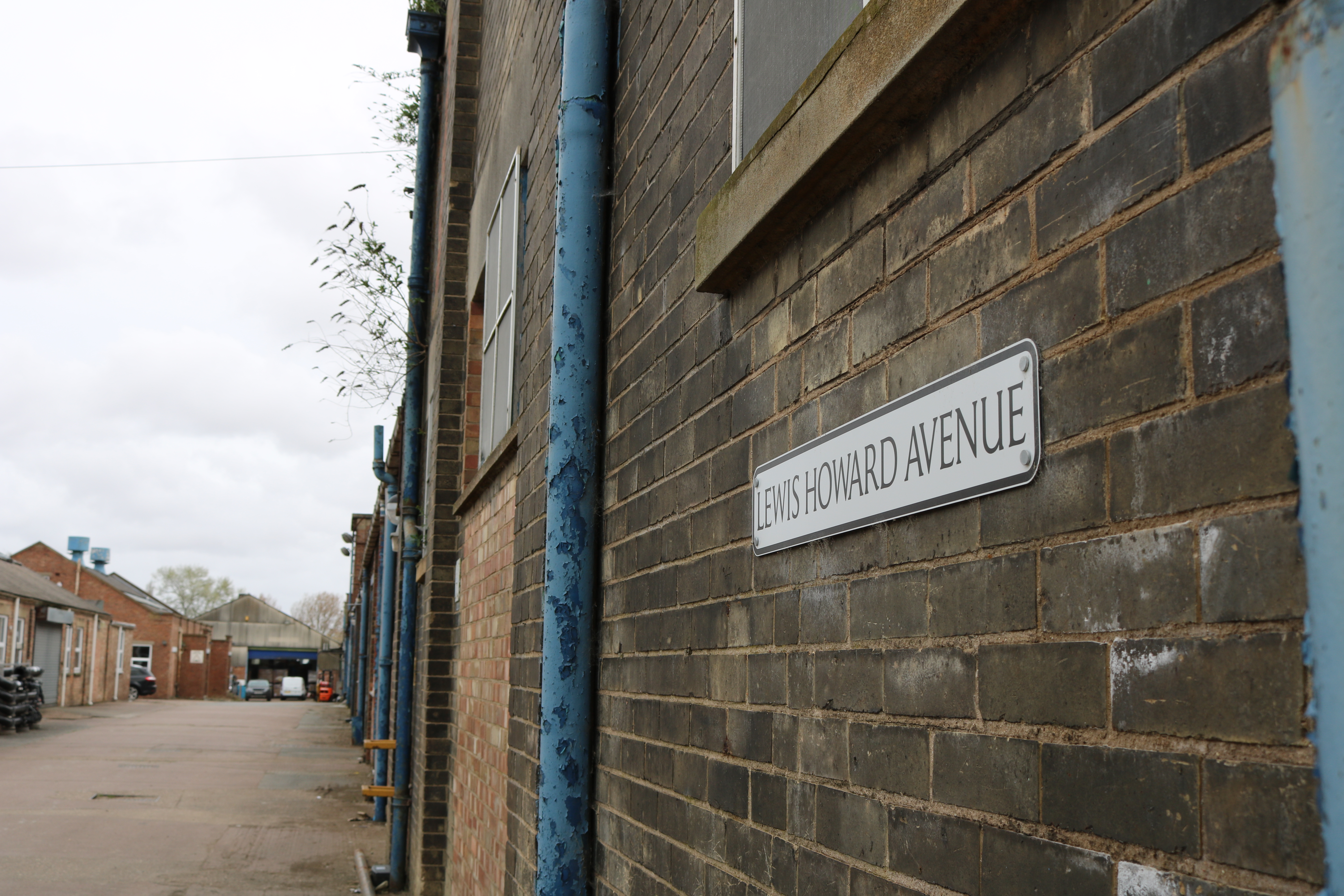
Lewis Howard Avenue Street Sign with the Road in the Background (2018)

== See also ==
- Barnardiston family (medieval aristocracy), holders of the manor of Great Coates from c. 1300
