= Stallingborough =

Village in Lincolnshire, England

Coordinates: 53.589°N 0.1837°W

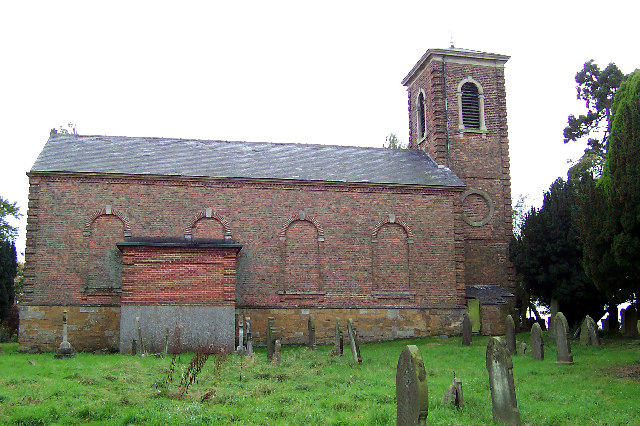
- Church of St Peter & St Paul, Stallingborough

- Location within Lincolnshire
- Population: 1,234 (2011 Census)
- OS grid reference: TA203118
  - London: 150 mi (240 km) S
- Unitary authority: North East Lincolnshire
- Ceremonial county: Lincolnshire
- Region: Yorkshire and the Humber
- Country: England
- Sovereign state: United Kingdom
- Post town: GRIMSBY
- Postcode district: DN41
- Dialling code: 01472
- Police: Humberside
- Fire: Humberside
- Ambulance: East Midlands
- UK Parliament: Brigg and Immingham

Stallingborough is a village and civil parish in North East Lincolnshire, England. The population of the civil parish at the 2011 census was 1,234.

== History ==
=== Prehistory-1840 ===
The area around Stallingborough may have been inhabited in prehistoric times; south-east of the village there is evidence of an Iron Age complex of enclosures.

Stallingborough is recorded as a manor (as "Stalinburg" or "Stalingeburg") in the 11th century Domesday Book. The medieval village of Stallingborough was to the west of the modern village and south of the 18th century church. The rights to hold a market and annual fair were granted by Henry III (13th century). Before the Black Death of the mid 14th century, the village had 50–60 households. This substantially decreased after the plague, but recovered to around 150 households by the mid 16th century. The medieval village is evidenced by earthworks, as well as cropmarks of fishponds, remains of ridge and furrow farming to the north, and a medieval cross in the churchyard of the modern church.

The medieval hagiography, On the Resting-Places of the Saints records that Stallingborough is the burial place of the Anglo-Saxon Saint Avbur. A chapel to St Avbur is mentioned in a will of Ric[hard] Hooton of Stallingborough dated 1530.

The village was also the site of a manor house and associated formal gardens (post medieval, probably early 17th century). The medieval church collapsed in 1746, and the manor house was demolished in the same period. Enclosure in the 18th century reduced the population again, to around 67 households by 1758. St Peter & St Paul's Church was built in brick in 1779–81. In 1801 the village had a population of 274 in 59 houses, in 1821 343 persons in 63 houses. An 18th century extension of the Manor House, known as Stallingborough House, survived until the 1840s, when it was also demolished.

=== 1840–1950 ===
Stallingborough railway station and the Great Grimsby and Sheffield Junction Railway opened around 1848, passing through the northern part of the village.

A fixed lighthouse (Stallingborough Light) was built in 1849 (lat. 53°37'), located in the Ferry House on the east bank of the outlet onto the Humber of the North Beck Drain.

In about 1860 the Hull Citadel was decommissioned, and new gun batteries constructed to replace it; the major works was the fort at Paull on the north bank of the Humber; at Stallingborough a battery of 6 guns was built. (Note: See Ordnance Survey Sheet 241SW 1952 edition. The fort was omitted from earlier editions.)

In about 1887 the village included the church and vicarage, a smithy, and Wesleyan and a Primitive Methodist chapels, with the railway passing north of the church; the village extended to the north of the railway line, including the Green Man Inn, a manor house, and various dwellings spread along the main road. The extent of development of the village remained mostly unchanged until after the Second World War. The Grimsby and Immingham Electric Railway was built through the northern part of the parish in 1912.

Gun batteries were also installed on the Humber foreshore at Stallingborough in the first and second world wars. During the First World War Stallingborough battery had two 6 inch breech-loading Mk VII guns; the First World War fort is evidenced by a pillbox. There was also a 3,000 feet (910 m) airfield (closed 1919) used by a flight of No. 251 Squadron RAF which carried out marine patrols with Airco DH.6 planes. During the Second World War the site was again used, with 4.7 inch quick-firing gun and a searchlight. There was also an anti aircraft battery at Little London, with positions for four guns. Post war a location near the Little London site was used as a Royal Observer Corps monitoring post.

=== 1950–present ===
In 1953 National Titanium Pigments Ltd (or Laporte Titanium Ltd) established a titanium dioxide manufacturing plant on the site of the former gun battery. The plant became known as the Battery works. Through the latter part of the 20th century the plant was expanded and modernised, later becoming part of SCM Corporation (1983), Hanson plc (1986), Millennium Chemicals (1996), and Cristal (2007). In the 1960s a number of companies (Doverstrand, Revertex, Harco) developed chemical plants producing synthetic lattices and resins at a site south-east of the Battery Works, also on the estuary foreshore. After a series of company reorganisations and takeovers, the works were organised under a single company, Synthomer, by 2002.

The village of Stallingborough underwent some minor housing development in the second half of the 20th century. By the end of the 1970s small cul-de-sac developments had been built south of the railway line off Station Road, with further small developments towards the end of the century. The B1210 to the south of the village was built c. 1960. The A180 road was built in the 1970s, and passes through the north of parish,

On 14 June 1966, a Royal Air Force Vickers Varsity trainer from RAF Lindholme collided with a Cessna 337A aircraft at about 6,500 feet (2,000 m) close to the village, killing two people. Five people survived the accident. The Varsity, with three crew and three student navigators, landed in a field, with its nose and wing ripped off by a tree. The Cessna broke up in the air following the collision.

From the 1970s a large industrial estate was developed in the north of the parish (North Moss Lane Industrial Estate, Kiln Lane Trading Estate), south-west of the Battery Works.

In the 1990s "Dash for gas" the 1.26 GW South Humber Bank Power Station was constructed adjacent to the Synthomer chemical plant in two phases from 1997 to 1999.

In 2006 a training centre for the chemical industry, CATCH ("Centre for Assessment and Technical Competence Humber") opened at Stallingbrough industrial estate.

In 2007 planning permission was given to construct 35 houses at Poaches Rise, south of Station Road south-west of the station. In 2008 planning permission was given to construct 43 houses (Saxonfields Drive) in the south of village near the B1210 roundabout. Houses were built at both sites.

In 2016 an 88 acres (36 ha) vehicle handling site, for use by Kia Motors, was officially opened at the Kiln Lane industrial estate.

== Geography ==
The civil parish of Stallingborough is located in the county of North East Lincolnshire between Immingham and Grimsby. The parish extends about 3.7 miles (6 km) from the coast. To the north-east the parish is bounded by the Humber Estuary; south-east is the parish of Healing, with the Oldfleet drain forming most of the boundary; to the north-west is the parish of Immingham with the North Beck Drain forming the northern part of the boundary; the parishes of Keelby and Riby are to the south-west and south respectively. The area is predominantly low-lying: the land north-east of Stallingborough village is below 5 metres (16 ft) elevation; south-west of the village the land rises to 16 metres (52 ft) above sea level. A minor landmark is a former cereal mill, south of the village.

Stallingborough village is the only settlement of any note in the parish, apart from industrial buildings; the small hamlet of Little London is to the west of the village. Land use is predominantly agricultural, with drained enclosed fields; near the Humber Estuary foreshore there are industrial developments. There is a large industrial estate in the north of the parish; two chemical plants are located near the estuary foreshore: Cristal's Stallingborough plant (also known as the Battery Works, the former Millennium Inorganic Chemicals, or Laporte plc plant); and Synthomer's Stallingborough plant. The 1.28 GW South Humber Bank gas fired power station is adjacent to Synthomer's plant.

An industrial freight railway line to Immingham Docks (the former Grimsby and Immingham Electric Railway), the A180 road, the Barton Line (the former Great Grimsby and Sheffield Junction Railway, opened 1845), and the B1210 road run through the parish parallel to the coast (in order from north to south).

At the 2011 census the parish population was 1,234.

== Community ==
Stallingborough village amenities include a public house, village hall, a Church of England primary school and an alternative medical Centre called Orchard Barn, the church of St Peter and St Paul, (Note: The church is in the Haverstoe Deanery and is in The Keelby Group.) a retirement home, a home for vulnerable people, and a home for people with mental health problems.

Stallingborough is served by Stallingborough railway station (Barton Line) and connected to the road network by the A1173 and B1210.

== Notable people ==
- Sir William Askew (1490 – ca.1540) a gentleman at the court of Henry VIII and a juror in the trial of Anne Boleyn
- Anne Askew (1521–1546), an English writer, poet, Anabaptist preacher and Protestant martyr.
- Lieutenant-Colonel Ayscoghe Boucherett, JP DL (1755–1815) landowner, businessman and MP for Great Grimsby, 1796 to 1803.
- Jessie Boucherett (1825–1905), campaigner for women's rights, owned land in the village.

== See also ==
- The title Viscount Addison of Stallingborough was created in 1945.
- Stallingborough is mentioned as the dominion of Witlaf Stalling, in the legendary 13th century tale Havelok the Dane.
