= New Waltham =

Village and civil parish in North East Lincolnshire, England

Coordinates: 53.525175°N 0.061009°W

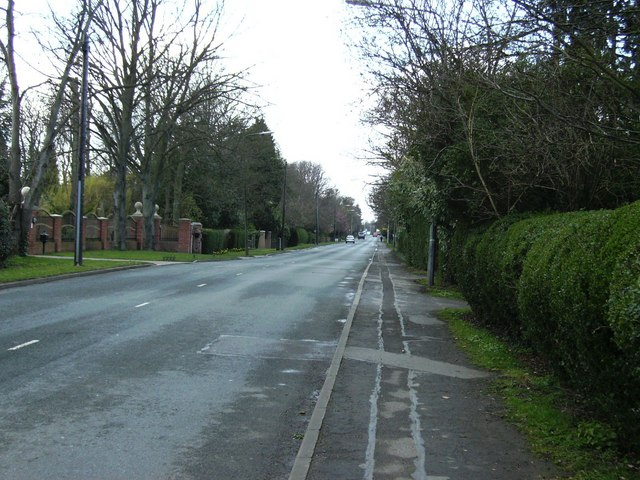
- Humberston Avenue looking towards New Waltham

- Location within Lincolnshire
- Population: 5,214 (2011)
- OS grid reference: TA286049
  - London: 140 mi (230 km) S
- Unitary authority: North East Lincolnshire
- Ceremonial county: Lincolnshire
- Region: Yorkshire and the Humber
- Country: England
- Sovereign state: United Kingdom
- Post town: Grimsby
- Postcode district: DN36
- Police: Humberside
- Fire: Humberside
- Ambulance: East Midlands
- UK Parliament: Brigg and Immingham

New Waltham is a village and civil parish in North East Lincolnshire, England. It is situated just south of Grimsby and Cleethorpes, close to the A16 (Louth Road), and between the villages of Waltham and Humberston.

The village originates from the opening of the East Lincolnshire Railway in 1848, which had a station built here to serve the neighbouring villages. Waltham Humberston Station had a station house and three station cottages. New housing gradually developed around the station site, with a large building phase throughout the 1950s. Previously part of Waltham parish, the parish of New Waltham was created in 1961. The village population at the 2001 census was 4,557, increasing to 5,214 at the 2011 census.

The main road is the B1219, named Station Road in the west (passing the former station) and continuing to the east as Humberston Avenue. The A16 by-passes the village to the west, and meets the B1219 at Toll Bar Roundabout. The boundary of North East Lincolnshire and East Lindsey is immediately south of the village, near Enfield Primary School, and the Lincolnshire village of Holton le Clay is 1 mile (2 km) to the south.

The village has three schools: Enfield Primary School, New Waltham Academy and the secondary school, Tollbar Academy, which is the largest in the region and between the village and Waltham.

There is a village hall just off Station Road, owned by the Parish Council, but run via an elected committee under the charities commission/Parish Council. Within the grounds is a small children's play area (in disrepair) and a small football pitch.

A second, more modern hall known as the Community Pavilion is found on St Clements Way. This is owned and run by the Parish Council. It includes five football changing rooms that and two full size football pitches.

To the side is a disused bowling green. The Parish Council has shared plans to turn this into a children's play area, with specific access for disabled people.

== Governance ==
New Waltham is part of the Brigg and Immingham parliamentary constituency. North East Lincolnshire Council has one electoral ward covering New Waltham, which is Humberston and New Waltham, two of the councillors for the ward currently are Conservatives and one is Reform.
