= North East Lincolnshire =

Borough in Lincolnshire, England

- Unitary authority and borough
- North East Lincs/Greater Grimsby
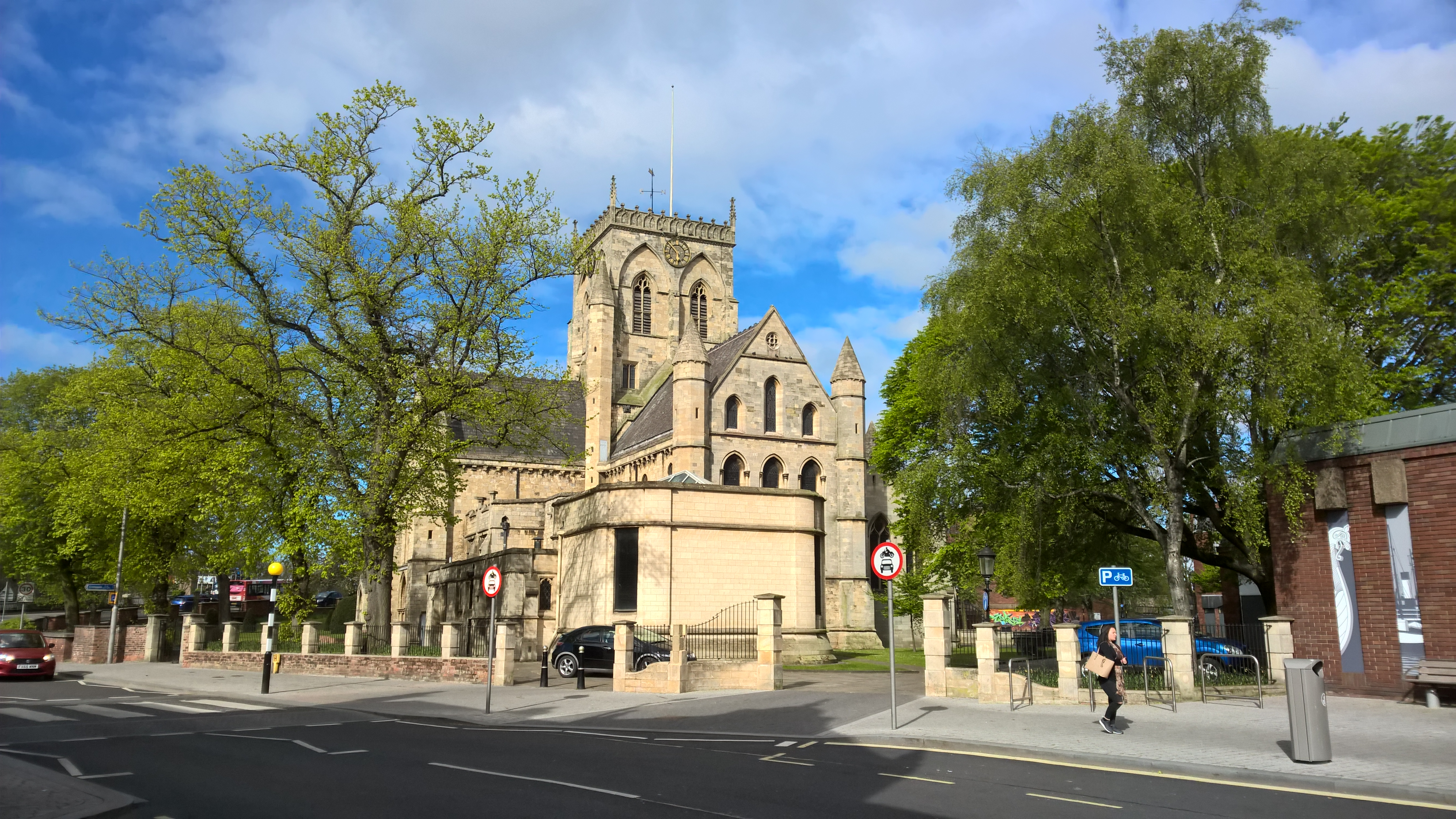
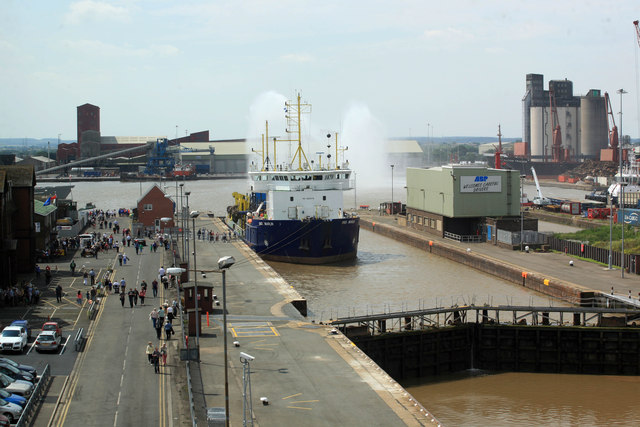
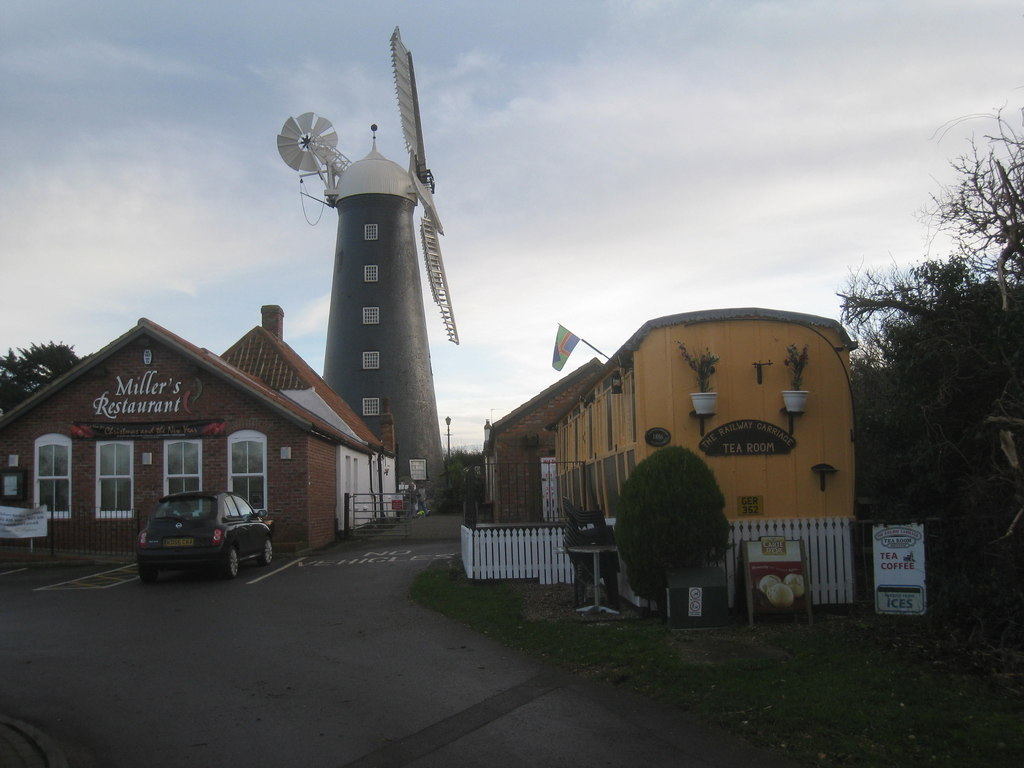
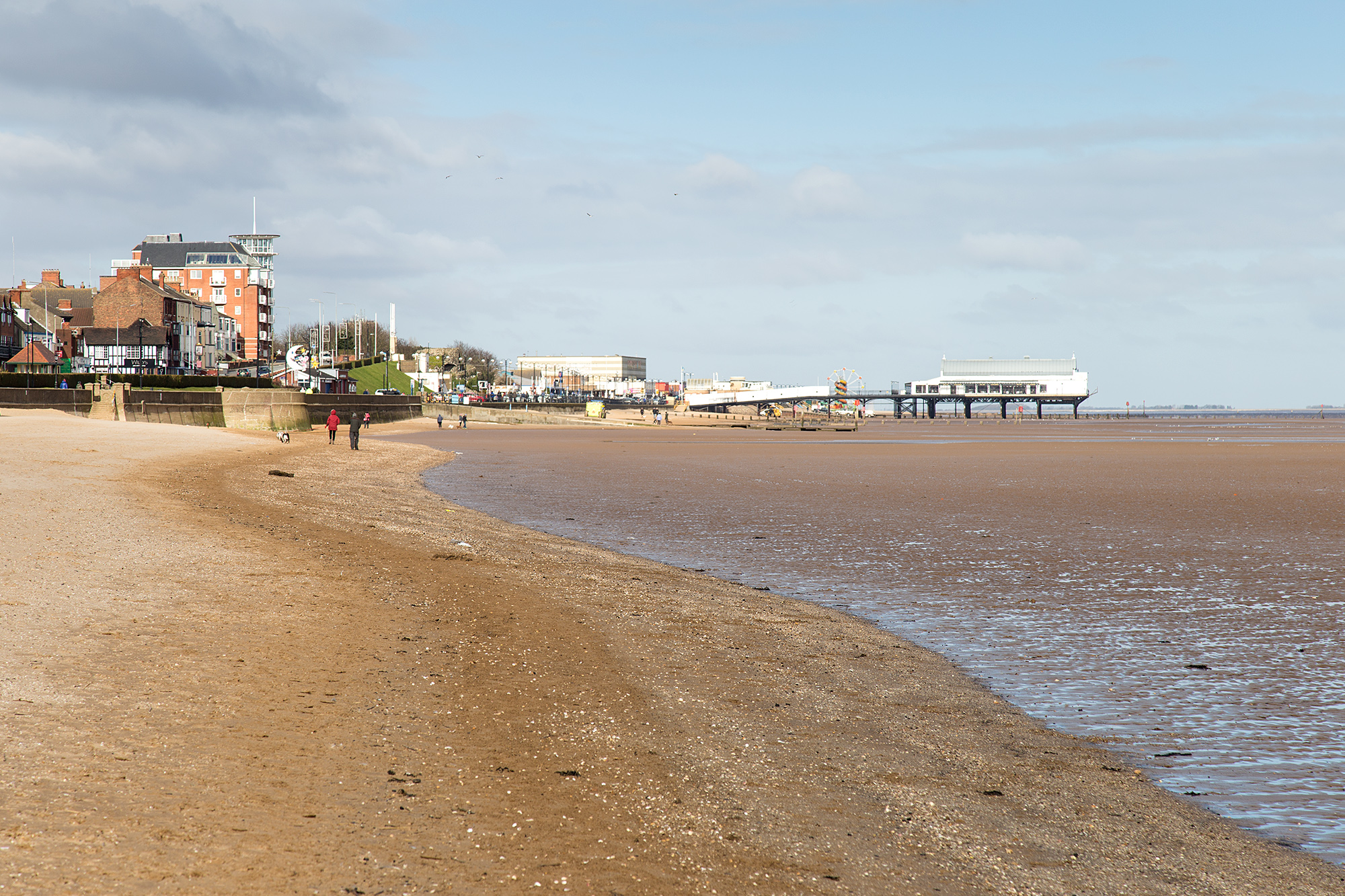
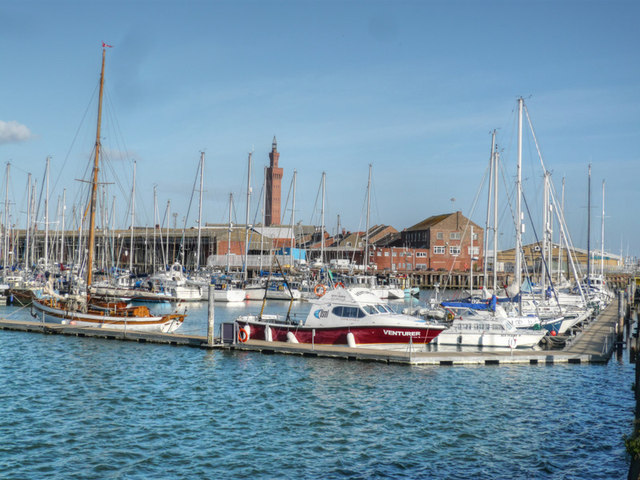
- From left to right; Top: The minster church of Grimsby; Middle: Immingham Docks in Immingham and Waltham Windmill in Waltham; Bottom: Cleethorpes Beach and Grimsby Docks

- Council logo

- Shown within Lincolnshire
- Coordinates: 53.55°N 0.10°W
- Sovereign state: United Kingdom
- Constituent country: England
- Region: Yorkshire and the Humber
- Ceremonial county: Lincolnshire
- Founded: 1996
- Admin. HQ: Grimsby
- Towns and large villages of the borough (2021 census BUASD): List: Cleethorpes (Town); Great Coates; Grimsby (Town); Healing; Humberston; Immingham (Town); Laceby; New Waltham; Nunsthorpe; Stallingborough; Waltham

Government
  - Type: North East Lincolnshire Council
  - Leadership: Leader & Cabinet
  - Executive: No overall control
  - MPs: Martin Vickers (Conservative); Melanie Onn (Labour)

Area
  - Total: 75 sq mi (193 km^{2})
  - Rank: 149th

Population (2025)
  - Total: 160,101
  - Rank: Ranked 138th
  - Density: 2,150/sq mi (830/km^{2})

Ethnicity (2021)
  - Ethnic groups: List: 96.2% White; 1.6% Asian; 1% Mixed; 0.5% Black; 0.7% other

Religion (2021)
  - Religion: List: 49.4% no religion; 48.1% Christianity; 1.3% Islam; 0.4% other
- Time zone: UTC+0 (Greenwich Mean Time)
  - Summer (DST): UTC+1 (British Summer Time)
- Postcode: DN
- ISO 3166-2: GB-NEL
- ONS code: 00FC (ONS); E06000012 (GSS)
- Website: nelincs.gov.uk

North East Lincolnshire is a unitary authority area with borough status in Lincolnshire, England. It borders the borough of North Lincolnshire and districts of West Lindsey and East Lindsey. The population of the district in the 2021 census was around 157,000. The administrative centre and largest settlement is Grimsby and the borough includes the towns of Cleethorpes and Immingham as well as the villages of New Waltham, Waltham, Humberston, Healing and Great Coates. The borough is also home to the Port of Grimsby and Port of Immingham as well as Cleethorpes beach.

== History ==
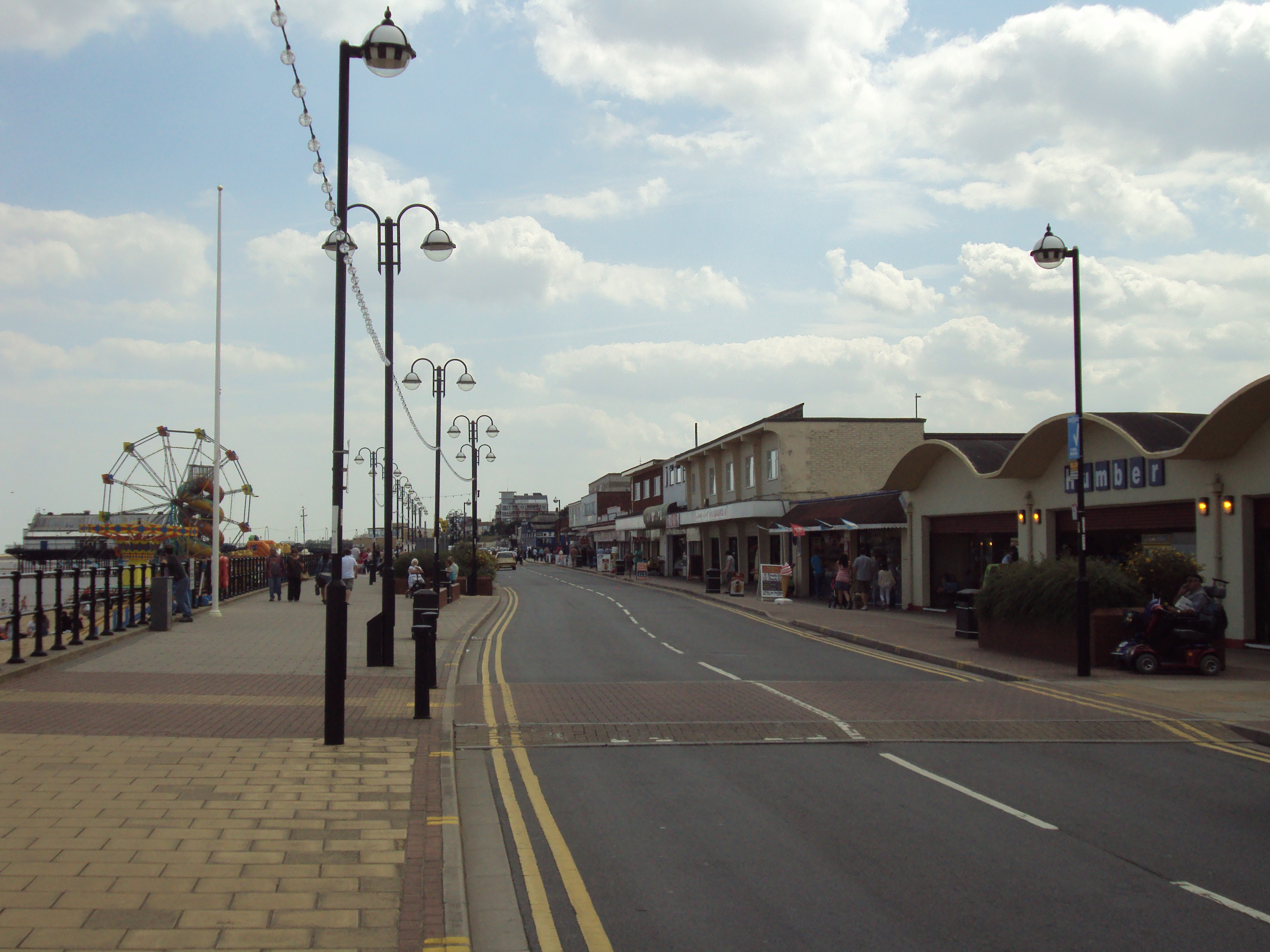
Cleethorpes, the second-largest town and famed for its beach and pier

North East Lincolnshire was created from the boroughs of Cleethorpes and Great Grimsby on 1 April 1996 with the abolition of Humberside. The area lies within the Parts of Lindsey, a historic subdivision of Lincolnshire. The district was awarded borough status on 23 August 1996, allowing the chair of the council to take the title of mayor.

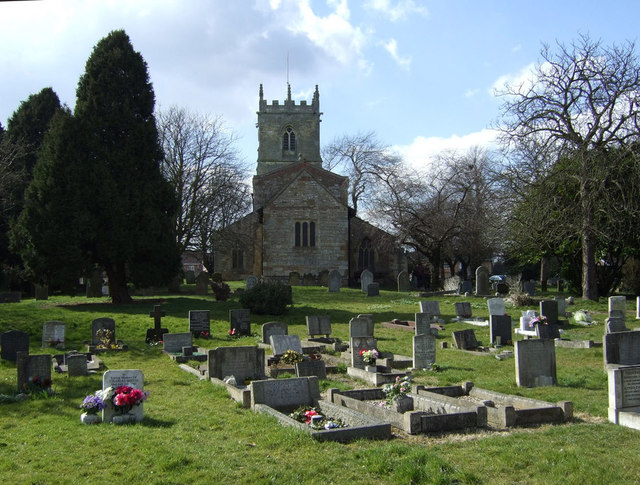
Immingham, the third-largest settlement in the borough

== Geography ==
The borough is located at the northeastern corner of Lincolnshire and opposite the East Riding of Yorkshire. It borders the Humber estuary. The area between Cleethorpes and Grimsby as well as the villages of Great Coates, Humberston, New Waltham and Waltham form a large conurbation. Immingham is separated from the Grimsby urban area by the A180 and is a few miles west of the town.

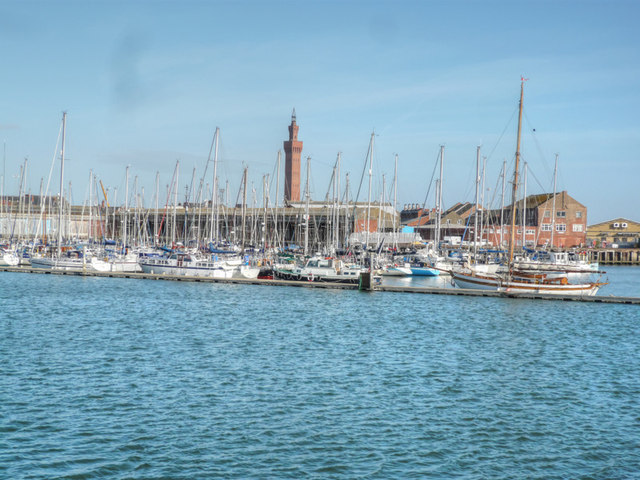
Grimsby Docks are an important trading port for importing and exporting goods internationally

== Governance ==
The council is based at Grimsby Town Hall, which had been built in 1863 for the old borough council of Grimsby.

== Towns and villages ==
- Ashby cum Fenby
- Aylesby
- Barnoldby le Beck
- Beelsby
- Bradley
- Brigsley
- Cleethorpes
- East Ravendale
- Great Coates
- Grimsby
- Habrough
- Hatcliffe
- Healing
- Humberston
- Immingham
- Irby upon Humber
- Laceby
- Little Coates
- New Waltham
- Old Clee
- Scartho
- Stallingborough
- Waltham
- Weelsby
- Wold Newton

== Places of interest ==
- Waltham Windmill
- Cleethorpes Coast Light Railway
- Blundell Park (home of Grimsby Town Football Club)
- The Greenwich Meridian passes through the county.
- Grimsby Minster
- Cleethorpes Pier

== Media ==
The radio station for the area was called Compass FM, and took its logo from the logo of North East Lincolnshire, being based south of Grimsby railway station. It became part of Greatest Hits Radio in 2020. BBC Radio Humberside covers this area which broadcast from Kingston upon Hull. Grimsby Institute had the innovative Estuary TV (former Channel 7) television, based at the Grimsby Institute of Further & Higher Education. Propeller TV was also part of Grimsby Institute. The Grimsby Telegraph is a daily newspaper. The area is served by BBC Yorkshire and Lincolnshire and ITV1 Yorkshire, received from the Belmont transmitter. Until 1974 it formed part of the ITV Anglia region.

== Economy ==
The North East Lincolnshire towns of Grimsby, Immingham and Cleethorpes, form the economic area known as Greater Grimsby. The main sectors of the Greater Grimsby economy are food and drink; ports and logistics; renewable energy and chemicals and process industries.

This is a table of trend of regional gross value added of North and North East Lincolnshire at current basic prices publisher, (pp. 240–253) by the Office for National Statistics with figures in millions of British pounds sterling.

Year	Regional Gross Value Added	Agriculture	Industry	Services
1995	3,512	82	1,701	1,729
2000	3,861	60	1,805	1,997
2003	4,569	62	1,896	2,611

The area has one power station, the South Humber Bank Power Station, which is owned and operated by Centrica sited at Stallingborough.

Similar to North Lincolnshire, the area has its fire and police run by Humberside Fire and Rescue Service and Humberside Police.

== Transport ==
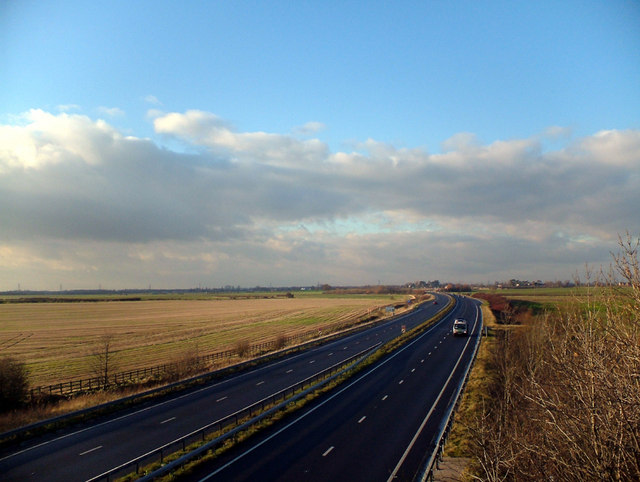
The A180 near Immingham, an important road for the authority

There are four main roads that link to the unitary authority - the A180 (from the M180) which was built in 1984, and the A46 from Lincoln. The A46 terminates in Cleethorpes, previously terminating at the Laceby roundabout, and follows the former route of the A18 through Grimsby and Cleethorpes. The A18 which runs from Doncaster to Laceby past the Humberside Airport. And the A16 from southern Lincolnshire through Louth, Entering the town at toll bar roundabout Waltham

There are good connections by railway from Doncaster and Sheffield, which start at Manchester Airport - the TransPennine Express.

The Port of Immingham is the UK's largest port by tonnage, handling around 46 million tonnes per year. It has DFDS freight routes to Brevik, Cuxhaven, Esbjerg, Gothenburg, Rotterdam and Zeebrugge. The Port of Grimsby is a major car importation hub, along with being an offshore wind farm servicing hub.

== Education ==
The local LEA has comprehensive schools, becoming comprehensive in the early 1970s when part of the County Borough of Grimsby, and the Lindsey Education Committee, based in Lincoln. However, due to the proximity of West and East Lindsey which have grammar schools, some children capable of passing the eleven-plus are bussed over the border to places such as Caistor, Louth, and Alford. Previous to this Cleethorpes had girls' and boys' grammar schools, and Grimsby had the girls' and boys' (which joined in the late 1960s) Wintringham grammar schools.

The local secondary schools have improved in recent years, but Grimsby still has some of the worst GCSE results in the country. There is a clear cut dichotomy of education up to 16, with schools on the edge of Grimsby and Cleethorpes performing with respectable results, leaving the centre of these towns with struggling schools that have faced closure. Most schools have converted to Academy status, with some also lucky enough to move into brand new spacious buildings. It is more the case that affluent parents would refuse to send their children to schools in central Grimsby, hence the schools on the outer edge do much better.

Franklin College has a good reputation at A level, and regularly produces the best A level results for state schools in the former area of Humberside (north and south). It was formed by the Humberside Education Committee, based in Beverly. Sixth formers travelled from East and West Lindsey to attend this college, such was its reputation.

The main FE college in Grimsby is the Grimsby Institute. This offers a wide range of vocational courses and has links with the fishing industry. It offers higher education courses, and has done for many years - HNDs, for vocational subjects. It has the long-term ambition to become a university. The University of Humberside used to have its food science campus at the college, but removed this when it became the University of Lincoln.

== Freedom of the Borough ==
The following people and military units have received the Freedom of the Borough of North East Lincolnshire.

=== Individuals ===
- 2008: Muriel Barker, Leader of North East Lincolnshire Borough Council.
- 17 May 2019: Andrew De Freitas, Leader of North East Lincolnshire Borough Council.

=== Military Units ===
- 45 Commando, RM: 16 May 2015.
