= Brigg and Immingham =

UK Parliament constituency (since 2024)

Coordinates: 53.64°N 0.35°W

- County constituency for the House of Commons
- Boundaries since 2024
- Boundary of Brigg and Immingham in Yorkshire and the Humber
- County: Lincolnshire
- Electorate: 71,838 (2024)
- Major settlements: Barton-upon-Humber; Immingham; Broughton; Brigg

Current constituency
- Created: 2024
- Member of Parliament: Martin Vickers (Conservative)
- Seats: One
- Created from: Cleethorpes; Brigg and Goole (part); Great Grimsby (minor part)

Brigg and Immingham is a constituency of the House of Commons in the UK Parliament. Created as a result of the 2023 review of Westminster constituencies, it was first contested at the 2024 general election. The current MP is Conservative Martin Vickers, who represented the predecessor seat of Cleethorpes from 2010 to 2024.

== Constituency profile ==
The Brigg and Immingham constituency is located in northern Lincolnshire and covers the rural areas along the Humber Estuary between the large towns of Grimsby and Scunthorpe. The largest settlement in the constituency is the town of Barton-upon-Humber with a population of around 11,000. Other settlements include the port town of Immingham and the small towns of Brigg and Broughton. The area has a history of clay mining, and the Port of Immingham—when taken together with the adjoining Port of Grimsby—is the busiest port in the United Kingdom by tonnage.

Compared to national averages, residents of the constituency are older, more religious and have average levels of wealth and professional employment. There is some deprivation in Immingham but the constituency also contains affluent villages on the outskirts of Grimsby like New Waltham. White people make up 97% of the population. At the local council level, all of the constituency's seats are represented by Conservative councillors. The constituency voted strongly in favour of leaving the European Union in the 2016 referendum with an estimated 66% of voters supporting Brexit, placing it in the top 10% of Brexit-supporting constituencies in the country.

== Boundaries ==
The 2023 review defined the constituency as being composed of the following as they existed on 1 December 2020:

- The Borough of North East Lincolnshire wards of: Humberston and New Waltham; Immingham; Scartho; Waltham; Wolds.
- The District of North Lincolnshire wards of: Barton; Brigg and Wolds; Broughton and Appleby; Ferry.

Following a local government boundary review in North Lincolnshire, which came into effect in May 2023, the constituency now comprises the following from the 2024 general election:

- The Borough of North East Lincolnshire wards of: Humberston and New Waltham; Immingham; Scartho; Waltham; Wolds.
- The District of North Lincolnshire wards of: Barton; Brigg & Wolds (all parts except parish of Cadney); Broughton & Scawby (parish of Broughton); Burton upon Stather & Winterton (parishes of Appleby and Roxby cum Risby); Ferry.

It comprises the following:

- The majority of the abolished Cleethorpes constituency - excluding the town of Cleethorpes itself (included in the new constituency of Great Grimsby and Cleethorpes)
- The Scartho ward from the abolished Great Grimsby constituency
- The towns of Brigg and Broughton, and rural areas to the north, from the abolished Brigg and Goole constituency.

== Members of Parliament ==
Election	Member	Party	Notes
2024	Martin Vickers	Conservative	MP for Cleethorpes 2010–2024

== Elections ==
=== Elections in the 2020s ===
General election 2024: Brigg and Immingham
Party	Candidate	Votes	%	±%
Conservative	Martin Vickers	15,905	37.4	−34.5
Labour	Najmul Hussain	12,662	29.8	+9.6
Reform	Paul Ladlow	10,594	24.9	+24.2
Green	Amie Watson	1,905	4.5	+1.7
Liberal Democrats	Eleanor Rylance	1,442	3.4	−1.0
Majority		3,243	7.6	−44.1
Turnout		42,508	57.2	−8.8
Registered electors		74,297		
Conservative hold		Swing	−22.1	

== See also ==
- Parliamentary constituencies in Humberside
- Parliamentary constituencies in Yorkshire and the Humber
