= Killingholme Power Station =

Killingholme Power Station may refer to:

- Killingholme A power station
- Killingholme B power station
- Unbuilt proposed oil and coal fired power station in the civil parish of North Killingholme
