= Industry of the South Humber Bank =

The south bank of the Humber Estuary in England is a relatively unpopulated area containing large scale industrial development built from the 1950s onward, including national scale petroleum and chemical plants as well as gigawatt scale gas fired power stations.

Historically the south bank was undeveloped, and mostly unpopulated, excluding the medieval port of Grimsby and lesser havens at Barton upon Humber and Barrow upon Humber. Industrial activity increased from the 19th century onwards, primarily brick and tile works utilising the clay extracted from the banks of the Humber; this plus the addition of chalk extraction at the edge of the Lincolnshire Wolds formed the basis of cement industries. Grimsby expanded during the industrial 19th century, and Immingham Dock was established in 1911, and a large scale cement works established near South Ferriby in 1938. Most of the brick and tile works ceased operation in around the 1950s.

From the 1950s onwards a number of chemical plants were built between Immingham and Grimsby, and two major oil refineries built south of Immingham Dock in the 1960s. Growth and development of the oil and chemical industries took place through the 20th century with some contraction of chemical works occurring in the late 20th century.

At the end of the 20th century and beginning of the 21st century a number of combined cycle gas turbine power stations were built (see also dash for gas), some of which utilised 'waste' steam to provide nearby petroleum and chemical plants with heat energy. During the same time frame a large area of former clay workings from earlier brick and tile activity was converted into water parks in the Barton area.

== Grimsby – Immingham ==
=== Background ===
The port of Grimsby, (Note: 53.57461°N 0.07477°W, Grimsby) was a significant local town and market in the medieval period, with fish being the predominant traded good. From around the 14th century the port's importance in international trade diminished, in part due to competition from Hull, Boston, as well as the Hanseatic League; whilst coastal trade and inland waterway trade became more important. In addition to fish a trade foodstuffs also took place, as well as coals from Newcastle and the export of peat dug in Yorkshire. Grimsby's population declined from around 1,400 in 1377 to around 750 by 1600 and to around 400 by the early 1700s. In the late 1700s a new dock was built at Grimsby, under the engineer John Rennie, opened 1800. In the 1840s the Sheffield, Ashton-under-Lyne and Manchester Railway constructed a rail line to the town, and a new dock was constructed in the same period; the town redeveloped as a port, and its growth re-initiated. Several new docks constructed between 1850 and 1900 with a third fish dock added in 1934. Rail connections linked the port to South Yorkshire, Lancashire and the Midlands; the net tonnage handled by the port increased from 163,000 in the 1850s to 3,777,000 by 1911. The port was also a major fishing centre, landing around 20% of the total UK catch (1934). The town's population rose consistently from 1,500 in 1801, to 75,000 in 1901, and to 92,000 in 1931. Neighbouring Cleethorpes also developed as a residential area for Grimsby as well as a seaside resort during the 19th century. In the 20th century, port based industries formed the main economic activities, with fishing being particularly important, influencing other industries in the town, specifically food processing, in particular frozen foods. In the late 1960s around 3,500 were employed directly in the fishing industry; 10,000 were employed in food industries of which 6,000 was fish processing activities; 2,500 in shipbuilding and repair; other lesser employment activities included engineering, and timber related businesses. Most of Grimsby's industries were concentrated on the Dock's estate, and later Pyewipe, west of the main centre.

In 1911 Immingham Dock was opened, (Note: 53.62794°N 0.19309°W, Immingham Dock) constructed for the Great Central Railway, primarily for the export of coal; the new dock was located at a point where the deep water channel of the Humber Estuary swung close to the south bank, with estuary side jetties that and could handle ships up to 30,000 deadweight tonnage. In the interwar period industry was developed on the north bank of the Humber in out of town locations: petroleum refining at Salt End (BP Saltend); smelting and cement manufacture at Melton (Capper Pass and the Humber Cement Works); and aircraft at Brough (Blackburn Aeroplane & Motor Company, later British Aerospace).

During the 1970s and early 1980s the fishing industry of Grimsby declined (to less than 15% of 1970 levels by tonnage by 1983) due to fuel costs (1973 fuel crisis), decline in fish stocks, Icelandic exclusion zones (see cod war), and new EEC fishing limits, though the port's market share remained roughly constant at around 20%, imported landings from Icelandic ships (as well as from ships of Norway, Faroes, Denmark, Belgium and Holland) became important to the continuation of Grimsby's role as a 'fish port'.

=== Industrialisation (1950–) ===
After the end of the Second World War the Humber bank and area between Grimsby and Immingham began to be developed by capital intensive industries, main focused on petroleum and chemicals. In addition to access to a modern port (Immingham) the regional advantages were availability of large areas of undeveloped flat land at low cost, with the Humber allowing discharge or effluent. The area was earmarked as being suitable for 'special' industries, such as those dealing with hazardous products or processes. Several large conglomerates or their subsidiaries acquired land banks in the area, and began developing industrial sites.

Grimsby Corporation acquired 694 acres (281 ha) of land between 1946 and 1953, who then improved the road and rail links, (Note: The rail line serving industrial plants along the Humber bank was adjacent to the route of the former Grimsby and Immingham Electric Railway) and sought industrial developers. An additional 189 acres (76 ha) was acquired by the corporation in Great Coates in 1960 and developed into a light industrial estate. (Note: 53.57631°N 0.11734°W, Great Coates industrial estate) (Note: Great Coates Industrial Estate, also known as Pyewipe industrial estate, or South Humberside Industrial estate.) Developers included British Titan Products (1949, titanium dioxide pigment), Fisons (1950, phosphate fertilizer), CIBA Laboratories (1951, pharmaceuticals), Laporte Industries (1953, titanium dioxide pigment), Courtaulds (1957, viscose and acrylic fibres). By 1961 developments occupied around 1,100 acres (450 ha) and employed over 4,000 persons. A limit to development was the fresh water supply available to industry. By the beginning of the 1960s the Fisons, Laporte, CIBA, Titan, and Courtaulds were consuming 10,000,000 imperial gallons (45,000,000 L; 12,000,000 US gal) per day, all of which was acquired from the chalk aquifer, some from the companies' own boreholes; this combined with Grimsby's water demand gave a total requirement of around 30,000,000 imperial gallons (140,000,000 L; 36,000,000 US gal) per day, which was considered close to what the aquifer could sustainably supply. As a consequence additional sources of supply were sought by the water board.

In the late 1960s two oil refineries were established near Immingham: (Total-Fina and Continental Oil) supplied from an estuary pier beyond Cleethorpes at Tetney.

Initially rail transport links were good, but road transport infrastructure very poor, essentially rural lanes. In the late 1960s the government identified the Humber region generally as suitable for large scale industrial development; subsequently development of the road networks on both banks was authorised (see M180 motorway, also M62), as well as the construction of the Humber Bridge.

A number of proposed or potential large scale developments in the latter part of the 20th century were not taken forward: The CEGB acquired a 360 acres (146 ha) site near Killingholme in 1960, and obtained consent for a 4 GW oil fired power station in 1972; the project was abandoned after the 1973 oil crisis; in 1985 the Killingholme site was listed as a possible NIREX disposal site for low level nuclear waste; in 1986 the CEGB listed Killingholme as a potential site for a coal fired power station; (Note: The Killingholme CCGT power station was built on site c. 1993.) A plan to reclaim land from the Humber at Pyewipe west of Grimsby using colliery waste was supported by Great Grimsby borough council as a potential source of new development land, interest in a reclamation scheme dated from at least the mid 1970s, and a report in the 1980s found the scheme feasible but expensive, the scheme was not supported by Humberside County Council who had sufficient development land elsewhere; Dow chemicals also acquired 490 acres (200 ha) of land in the 1970s.

By 1987 9,000 were employed in the South Humber bank area (excluding Grimsby-Cleethorpes, and rural north Lincolnshire).

During the 1990s dash for gas several gas turbine powered power stations with heat recovery steam generators were built in the area, including several gigawatt class output units: National Power and Powergen built adjacent 665 and 900 MW combined cycle gas turbine (CCGT) power stations near North Killingholme in the early 1990s; Humber Power Ltd. built CCGT plant in two phases (1994–1999), with final power output 1.2 GW; and ConocoPhillips built a combined heat and power plant using Gas turbine/HRSG/auxiliary boilers in two phases (opened 2004, about 730 MW and 2009, about 480 MW), used to supply heat (steam) to both the Lindsey and Humber refineries.

The Humber Sea Terminal at North Killingholme Haven, (Note: 53.66580°N 0.23709°W, Humber Sea terminal) is a modern RO-RO port terminal based on an estuary pier with 25 feet (7.5 m) minimum water depth; as of 2014 the terminal is operated by Simon Group Ltd a subsidiary of C.RO Ports SA. Six Ro-Ro terminals were developed in 2000 (1&2), 2003 (3&4) and 2007 (5&6).

Despite these developments the general character of the north Lincolnshire area in 1990 was agricultural, much of it large scale arable farming on high grade land, a pattern that is unchanged at the beginning of the 21st century.

Business	Established	History
British Titan Products	1949	British Titan Products Co. Ltd. (BTP) established a plan for the production of Titanium dioxide from Ilmenite via a sulphur process to the north east of Great Coates (Pyewipe) on the Humber bank near Grimsby. (Note: 53.58305°N 0.10435°W, British Titan Products) Initial production was 20,000 t per year, increased to 100,000 t in the 1960s. The company was renamed BTP Tioxide c. 1976. The plant became part of the Huntsman Corporation in 1999. Overcapacity and competition led to redundancies in the 2000s, and in 2009 the plant ceased operations. In 2013 the 110 acres (45 ha) site was offered for sale for industrial use. A 13+9 MW combined heat and power gas and steam turbine plant (established 2003) owned by Npower remains on site.
Fisons	1950	Fisons Fertilizers was built adjacent southeast of Immingham Dock, (Note: 53.62369°N 0.19085°W, Fisons Fertilizers) for the production of superphosphate and compound fertilizers (NPK). In the 1960s ICI entered into an arrangement with Fisons for the supply of ammonia to the company, and agreed to construct an ammonia plant to supply Fison's Immingham site. Fisons also began an expansion of phosphoric acid capacity at its Imminghame site in the same period. The ICI plant at Immingham had a production capacity of 200,000 t per year, and was operational by the end of the 1966. In December 1965 a boiler made of Ducol destined for the ammonia plant had exploded during pressure-testing at the manufacturers. In 1982 Fisons sold its fertilizer business to Norsk Hydro. In the late 1980s Norsk Hydro built an ammonium nitrate fertilizer plant at Immingham. In 2000 the company announced it was to close the ammonium nitrate and nitric acid plant at Immingham, resulting in 150 redundancies and ending fertilizer manufacture at the site. In 2004 Norsk Hydro's fertilizer business was demerged as Yara International. As of 2014 Yara operates a dry ice plant at Immingham, as well as operating a distribution centre for liquid fertilizer products.
CIBA	1951	CIBA Laboratories Ltd. established a plant on the Humber bank, (Note: 53.58622°N 0.11396°W, CIBA Laboratories) north of Great Coates near Grimsby for the manufacture of chemicals and pharmaceuticals. Initial production was antibacterial agent Sulfathiazole (branded as Cibazol). The plant became part of Ciba Chemicals in 1962, and part of Ciba-Geigy in 1971 after the parent company merged. The plant's production included agrochemicals, plastics intermediates, and pharmaceuticals. Plant facilities were expanded in the 1970s, and 1990s/2000s. In 1996 the plant became part of Ciba-Geigy successor Novartis. In 2005 a production facility for drug Diovan was opened. Much of the plant's production is of pharmaceutical intermediates, produced for export to other plants. In 1992 Ciba completed a £230 million expansion to the Grimsby plant, including two production units, an 8 MW gas fired CHP power plant, and an effluent treatment plant. In the mid 1990s Allied Colloids (Bradford) established at production facility between the Ciba and Courtlauld's plants near Grimsby. Allied Colloids was acquired by Ciba Specialty Chemicals (Ciba-Geigy group spin off, 1996) in 1998. The Allied Colloids site at Grimsby was included in BASF's 2008 acquisitions. In 2010 BASF Performance Products plc was formed incorporating former Ciba plants; the subsidiary was merged in to BASF plc in 2013.
Laporte Titianium	1953	National Titanium Pigments Ltd. (after 1953 Laporte Titanium Ltd.) a subsidiary of Laporte established a plant for the production of Titanium dioxide (TiO2) from Ilmenite by a sulphur process to the south east of Immingham Dock on the Humber bank. (Note: 53.61542°N 0.15994°W, Laporte Titanium) In the 1950s Laporte was seeking a site for expansion from its titanium dioxide plant in Kingsway, Luton – the company had acquired 40 acres (16 ha) of land near Grimsby in 1947 for £4,000, but the nearby land was acquired by BTP and the land was sold another site was sought. A 100 acres (40 ha) site near Stallingborough containing a former coastal gun battery was acquired, as a result the plant became known as the 'Battery works'. Construction (contracted to Taylor Woodrow) began 1950 with 2500 piles driven to stabilise the ground. In addition to the rail connection an estuary pier was also constructed (reconstructed 1955). Simon Carves was contracted to build the 100t per day pyrites fueled sulphuric acid plant. Both the acid and pigment plant became operational in 1953, with a workforce of about 280. Initial planned capacity was 8,000 t per year in two streams; the production capacity was increased by 8 times over the next 15 years, including extension to the acid production, with a sulphur burning plant (Simon Carves) operational by 1958, and a third acid plant built in 1961. A research laboratory was opened in 1960. Other production at the site included phthalic anhydride (1966), through a joint venture "Laporte-Synres" with Chemische Industrie Synres (Netherlands); and the synthetic clay laponite (1968). A plant producing titanium diozide pigment by the chloride process was commissioned in 1970, and expansion begun in 1976. By 1977 employment was nearly 1600. In 1980/1, in part due to increased energy costs, Laporte announced it was to shut down its 40,000t titanium dioxide pa sulphate process with the loss of 1,000 jobs; later reduced to a halving of production. In 1983/4 Laporte sold its titanium dioxide business to SCM Corporation (USA), the Laponite production facilities were subsequently transferred to Laporte in Widness. Further expansion of the chloride process for titanium dioxide by SCM led to a production capacity of 78,000 pa by 1986, whilst production capacity via the sulphate process was 31,000 t pa. In 1990 SCM announced it was to reduce production by 24,000 t from 110,000 t pa to comply with EEC environmental regulations. SCM was acquired by Hanson plc (1986), which demerged Millennium Chemicals (1996), then acquired by Lyondell Chemical Company in 2004. An expansion of titanium dioxide production in 1995 to 1999 increased capacity to 150,000 t pa. In 2007 Millennium Inorganic Chemicals was acquired by Saudi Arabian firm Cristal (National Titanium Dioxide Company Limited). In 2009 the plant employed 400 workers; production was halted temporarily after European demand dropped 35% due to a recession. In 2019 Cristal was acquired by Tronox. Cristal’s North American TiO2 business was sold to British chemicals firm Ineos as a condition of the acquisition required by the US Federal Trade Commission There have been serious process safety incidents involving titanium tetrachloride at the plant: In 2010 a vessel containing titanium tetrachloride and hydrochloric acid ruptured injuring three operators with inhalation and chemical burns from the toxic/corrosive substances. One of the operators subsequently died from his injuries. In 2012 the Health and Safety Executive stopped production for 3 months after the release of titanium tetrachloride in 2011. A twin 6 MW has turbine plus 3 MW steam turbine is operated by NPower Cogen (since 2004, formerly TXU Energy) at the site.
John Bull Rubber	1955	John Bull Rubber established a factory near Grimsby in 1955. (Note: 53.58212°N 0.11217°W, John Bull Rubber) John Bull Rubber was acquired by Dunlop in 1959. The factory produced rubber hoses, and is still in operation as of 2012 as part of Dunlop Oil & Marine.
Courtaulds	1957	Courtaulds Ltd. established a plant for the production of Viscose from wood pulp via the carbon disulphide process, and for Acrylic fibre via acrylonitrile polymerisation on the Humber bank roughly halfway between Immingham and Grimsby docks. (Note: 53.59324°N 0.13046°W, Courtaulds) Capacity was 100,000,000 pounds (45,000 t) of rayon, with the acrylic plant opened in 1957 with an initial capacity of 10,000,000 pounds (4,500 t) of Courtelle, increased to 100,000,000 pounds (45,000 t) by 1969; the plant was further expanded in the 1960s and early 1970s. At a peak it employed around 2800. In the 1980s foreign competition and the establishment of production in former client markets led to the beginning of a decline in employment. Akzo Nobel acquired the plant in 1998, forming the company Acordis after merging with its own fibre business, which was divested to CVC Capital Partners in 1999. In 2004 production facilities for Tencel were sold to Lenzing. As of 2013 the plant had a capacity of 40,000 t per year of Lyocell/Tencell. The other production plant (as part of Accordis), entered administration in 2005 at which point employment had been reduced to 475, was restarted as Fibres Worldwide with a workforce of 275, but entered administration in 2006. The plant being acquired by Bluestar Group (china) in late 2006, with the product used as a carbon fibre precursor (Polyacrylonitrile). Production ended in 2013 due to loss of demand, A 48 MW gas powered CH&P power station at the site was spun off as Humber Energy Ltd. in 2005 whilst the parent was in administration; the firm was acquired by GDF Suez subsidiary Cofely in 2013. In mid 2015 a 1,200,000 square feet (110,000 m^{2}) building space industrial estate was approved for the site.
Harco / Doverstrand / Revertex	1963	A synthetic latex manufacturing facility was established c. 1962 near Stallingborough by Doverstrand Ltd, a joint venture of Revertex and International Latex Corporation (later known as Standard Brands Chemical Industries). The plant was expanded c. 1965 to double output. Products included styrene-butadiene Rubber (SBR) and acrylonitrile butadiene latices. Revertex began production of Lithene (liquid polybutadienes) in 1974 near Stallingborough. In 1963 the Harlow Chemical Company (Harco) was established as a joint venture between Revertex and Hoescht for chemical production. In 1976 Harco began the construction of a 30,000 t pa resin emulsion plant at a greenfield site near Stallingborough, the plant began operations in 1978. Additional dispersion production transferred from Harlow to Stallingborough in 1991. Revertex was acquired by Yule Catto in 1981. Doverstrand Ltd. (then a Reichhold Chemicals/Yule Catto jv) was renamed Synthomer Ltd. in 1995. In 2001 Yule Catto took over Harco, acquiring the 50% shareholding of partner Clariant, and merged the business into its Synthomer subsidiary in 2002, resulting in the merger of the adjacent Synthomer and Harco activities at Stallingborough. (Note: 53.60487°N 0.14246°W, Synthomer Ltd.) Latex production ended late 2011, and further adhesive chemical production facilities were established at the site c. 2012.
Total-Fina	1968	Total Oil/Fina established an oil refinery on a 373 acres (151 ha) site, named the Lindsey Oil Refinery (LOR); (Note: 53.64380°N 0.25076°W, Total-Fina refinery) key factors in the choice of site were the cheapness of available land, and nearby suitable sites for large oil tankers. Initially expectations of output were 250,000 and 150,000 imperial gallons (1,140 and 680 m^{3}) per hour exported by rail and road respectively, from a refining capacity of around 3 million tons per year. Production was a full range of refined oil from heavy fuel oil to liquefied petroleum gas. By the 1969 refinining capacity had been doubled by a second phase. Capacity was increased to 9.6 million tons in the 1970s, and during the 1980s a catalytic cracker, alkylation unit, visbreaker and methyl tert-butyl ether MBTE added. In 2007 construction of a hydrodesulfurization unit and steam Methane reformer was begun. In 2009 workers at the plant went on strike due to preferential employment of foreign works, leading to a series of sympathy walkouts at other UK chemical, energy and petroleum plants, (see 2009 Lindsey Oil Refinery strikes). The strike delayed the installation of the desulphurisation unit by 6 months. A fire and explosion occurred at the plant in 2010, killing one worker. The fire further delayed the de-sulphurisation unit. The de-sulphurisation unit was official inaugurated in 2011. In 2010 Total announced it planned to sell the refinery, citing overcapacity; by late 2011 the company had failed to sell the plant, and halted the sales process.
Continental Oil	1969	Continental Oil established an oil refinery on a 380 acres (150 ha) site, named the Humber Oil Refinery; (Note: 53.63370°N 0.24814°W, Continental Oil refinery) Initial refining capacity was 4.5 million tons per year. In addition to a full range of refined products (heavy fuel oil to liquified petroleum gas), the plant also incorporated a 110,000 ton per year benzene production, and a 250,000 ton electrode grade petroleum coke plant. The Tetney monobuoy (operational 1971), a SBM in the Humber Estuary is used to discharge oil tankers with the oil stored at the Tetney Oil Terminal, (Note: 53.49992°N 0.00123°E, Tetney oil terminal (tank farm)) and transferred via pipeline. A fire and explosion occurred at the plant in 2001.
Humber Power Ltd.	1997/1999	The South Humber Bank Power Station was constructed between 1994 and 1997 near the Humber Estuary northeast of Stallingborough; (Note: 53.60138°N 0.14489°W, South Humber Bank power station) The initial development consisting of three 166 MW gas turbines, and 255 MW steam turbine. A second phase was built between 1996 and 1999 with two 166 MW gas turbines and one 171 MW steam turbine. Gas turbines are ABB Alstom GT13E2 machines, with ABB steam turbines and generators. Total power 1.266 GW The owner Humber Power Limited was a venture of Midland Power, ABB Energy Ventures, Tomen Group, British Energy and TotalFinaElf. Ownership was consolidated in TotalFinaElf, who sold 60% to GB Gas Holdings Ltd., a subsidiary of Centrica (2001). In 2005 Centrica took 100% ownership of the plant. In early 2014 Centrica began to seek buyers for a number of its gas power plants, including its South Humber and Killingholme plants, in early 2015 it decided to retain the plant, but sought to reduce the output from 1,285 to 540 MW from April 2015. In July 2015 Centrica announced it was to overhaul the gas turbines at a cost of £63 million, increasing total capacity by 14 MW.
ConocoPhillips	2004	The ConocoPhillips' combined heat and power plant was opened in 2004, adjacent to ConocoPhillips Humber Oil Refinery. (Note: 53.63764°N 0.23630°W, Immingham gas power station (Vitol)) The power station was built at a cost of £350 million with 734 MW total electric output. The design consisted of two 260 MW General Electric 9FA gas turbines, each connected to a heat recovery steam generator (HRSG) from Nooter Eriksen driving Franco Tosi steam turbines for a further 2x 155 MW output. 'Waste' steam was used to provide thermal power to both the Humber and Lindsey refineries. The plant included two auxiliary boilers to ensure a constant supply of steam for the refineries. In 2009 the plant was expanded raising generating capacity from 730 to 1,180 MW, with one 285 MW GE 9FB gas turbine, with a 200 MW Toshiba steam turbine driven via a HRSG. Energy production at the plant is primarily determined by heat supply requirements. In 2013 Vitol acquired the plant through acquisition of Phillips 66 subsidiary Phillips 66 Power Operations Ltd.; the plant was renamed Immingham CHP.
National Power	1994	In 1994 National Power built a 665 MW combined cycle gas fired powerstation near North Killingholme. (Note: 53.65952°N 0.25511°W, Killingholme A CCGT (National Power)) The plant consisted of three 145 MW gas turbines with a 227 MW steam turbine. NEI ABB Gas Turbines Ltd (ABB group) was contracted to supply the plant on a turnkey contract, with three GT13E gas turbines (145 MW) and a 227 MW steam turbine. In 2000 NRG Energy acquired the plant for £410 million, and in 2004 Centrica acquired the plant for £142 million after a fall in electricity prices. In early 2014 Centrica began to seek buyers for a number of its gas power plants, including its South Humber and Killingholme plants, and in early 2015 began discussion on the closure of the plant, having received no acceptable bids for the plant. Sometimes referred to as Killingholme A.
Powergen	1992	In 1992 Powergen built a 900 MW combined cycle gas fired powerstation near North Killingholme. (Note: 53.65419°N 0.25518°W, Killingholme B CCGT (Powergen)) In 1996 a water cooling system was fitted to the plant, designed to reduce plume formation. In 2002 the plant was mothballed due to low electricity prices; the plant was restarted in 2005. In June 2015 E.On announced it was to close the powerstation. Sometimes referred to as Killingholme B.

== South Ferriby – Immingham ==
Barton upon Humber dates to the pre-Norman Conquest period, and was the location for a ferry crossing of the Humber from at least that period. The towns was once an important port, but declined after the establishment of Kingston upon Hull (c. 1300). The town remained an important port for north Lincolnshire, and in 1801 had a population of around 1,700, more than Grimsby. Due to the presence of suitable soil, brick and tile making was carried out in the Barton area; in the 1840s one tilery had been established for over a hundred years; chalk was also quarried in the area, from at least 1790. Other industries in 1840 included whiting manufacture, rope making, tanning, plus trade in agricultural produce.

=== Clay and chalk based industries ===
At Barton upon Humber clay had been extracted for tile making since at least the 18th century. Several brick and tile manufactures operated during the 19th century, with growth stimulated in part by the end of the Brick tax in 1850. By 1892 works included Ness End, West Field, Humber Brick and Tile, Barton, Morris's, Dinsdale-Ellis-Wilson, Garside's, Blyth's Ing, Burton's, Mackrill's (Briggs), Pioneer, Hoe Hill and Spencer's. The works extended along most of the Humber bank from Barton Cliff around 1 mile west of barton Haven to Barrow Haven. The works reduced in number during the first half of the 20th century. By the 1970 much of the foreshore had been extracted, and the majority of works were no longer active. Several of the works had industrial railways, generally connecting the workings to the works; in some cases clay was exported directly, such as that supplied to G.T. Earle's cement works in Wilmington, Kingston upon Hull from the Humber Brick & Tile works (c. 1893–1900). Many of the Barton brick and tile works closed in the 1950s. As of 2009 the Blyth's tile works at Hoe Hill is still operational, producing tiles using non-modern methods at a small scale.

The clay extraction, and brick and tile industry extended further east along the Humber bank. There were further works at Barrow Haven, New Holland including the Old Ferry Brick Works and Barrow Tileries (Barrow); the Atlas, and New Holland Stock brick works east of Barrow haven, the Quebec Brick & Tile works approximately 1.5 miles east of New Holland, and scattered works eastward on the bank as far as South Killingholme Haven, as well as brick works as South Ferriby and along the New River Ancholme near Ferriby Sluice. A site at East Halton was used to supply G.T. Earle's cement works in Stoneferry, whilst the same firm's Wilmington works was supplied with clay from pits near North Killingholme Haven (1909–13), and later from pits between Barton and Barrow on Humber (1913–69).

In the 1890s George Henry Skelsey used funds from a public listing of his company to build a cement plant, Port Adamant Works, at Barton, west of the Haven, replacing a site he had acquired in 1885 at Morley Street, Stoneferry, Hull in the 1880s. Clay and chalk for the process were sourced on site, with chalk brought from the New Cliff chalk quarry, (Note: 53.6876°N 0.47703°W, New Cliff quarry) by a short narrow gauge rail line. Initially the plant had a capacity of around 330t per week, using chamber kilns, supplemented by shaft kilns in around 1901 increasing weekly capacity by around 320 t. In 1911 the company became part of British Portland Cement Manufacturers, and a rotary kiln was installed in 1912 replacing the earlier kilns. The plant closed in 1927 after the acquisition and establishment by the parent company of the large Humber Cement Works and Hope Cement Works.

Adjacent west of the New Cliff quarry was Barton Cliff Quarry, (Note: 53.6875°N 0.47985°W, Barton Cliff quarry) (chalk) also connected by a short rail line to the Humber foreshore; the quarry closed 1915. To the south west was Leggott's Quarry, (Note: 53.6821°N 0.48720°W, Leggott's quarry) (also known as "Ferriby Quarry"), also connected by a short rail line to the foreshore. The two quarries supplied chalk, including to G.T. Earle's Stoneferry and Wilmington plants respectively.

In 1938 Eastwoods Ltd established a cement works near South Ferriby, west of Ferriby Sluice. (Note: 53.67608°N 0.52959°W, Eastwood's Cement (now CEMEX)) The initial plant consisted of a single 200.1 by 8.2 feet (61 by 2.5 m) rotary kiln with an output of around 200t per day by the wet process. Chalk was supplied from a quarry, Middlegate quarry, (Note: 53.6696°N 0.49594°W, Middlegate quarry) south east of South Ferriby, which was crushed at the quarry and transported to the cement plant by aerial ropeway, whilst clay was supplied from west adjacent west of the plant. In 1962 the plant became part of Rugby Portland Cement Co. Ltd. In 1967 a semi-dry process rotary kiln was installed and the first kiln ceased operating. In 1974 the excavations at the chalk quarry were extended below the chalk through a relatively thin layer of red chalk and carrstone to the underlying clay, which was also extracted for use in the process – a conveyor belt system was installed to transport the materials to plant; the clay extraction west of the plant then ceased. A second rotary kiln was added in 1978. Ownership passed to Rugby Group (1979), RMC (2000), and then to CEMEX 2005.

A modern tile manufacturer Goxhill Tilieries (as of 2014 part of the Wienerberger group via Sandtoft) is located east of New Holland and north of Goxhill (near the former Quebec brickyard). (Note: 53.70812°N 0.33119°W, Goxhill Tileries) The company Sandtoft was established in 1904 as brick maker, and started tile production at Goxhill in 1934. Concrete tile manufacturing capacity was expanded during the 20th century.

=== BritAg fertilizers ===
A fertilizer works was established at Barton, near the river bank east of the Haven in 1874 by "The Farmers Company". In 1968 the owner A.C.C. (Associated Chemical Companies) established new chemically based fertilizer production at the site, (Note: 53.69551°N 0.43858°W, BritAg fertilizers) including a 180t per day Nitric acid plant, a 317t per day ammonium nitrate plant, plus a 475t per day fertilizer plant. In 1965 A.C.C. became a full subsidiary of Albright and Wilson, including the Barton plant.

The fertilizer business of Albright and Wilson was acquired by ICI in 1983, Loss of UK market share caused ICI to close the plant in the late 1980s, as well as other fertilizer production facilities.

Subsequently, the site was sold to Glanford borough, and later redeveloped together with former brick yards as a park Water's Edge.

=== Other ===
In 1992 Kimberly-Clark established a large nappy mill outside Barton upon Humber, (Note: 53.68516°N 0.41557°W, Kimberley Clark factory) the plant was built at a cost of about £100,000, for the manufacture of Huggies nappies. The plant was closed in 2013, due to the company ceasing most of its production of nappies in the European market. In August 2013 Wren Kitchens took over the 180 acres (73 ha) site and began conversion of the 750,000 square feet (70,000 m^{2}) factory space into head offices, plus manufacturing and warehousing. In April 2020, Wren began an extension project to its facility at the cost of £130 million.

There are also private wharfs at Barton-upon-Humber (Waterside), (Note: 53.69607°N 0.44312°W, Barton Haven) Barrow Haven, (Note: 53.69924°N 0.39365°W, Barrow Haven) and New Holland. (Note: 53.70405°N 0.36056°W, New Holland)

== Redevelopments ==
At the Barton foreshore directly west of Barton Haven the brick works had been closed and demolished by 1955, and an extension of a fertilizer works, BritAg, was built on the site. After closure the site was acquired by Glanford Borough Council in c. 1990 from ICI for £335,000, (Note: Sources give either 1989 or 1991) indemnifying the company from any responsibility for cleaning up the site. Initially the council planned to reclaim and clean up the land, and establish an industrial estate on site. The local authority failed to gain funding for the redevelopment and cleanup, and in 1996 Glanford's successor North Lincolnshire Council inherited the site and terminated the redevelopment plans due to their cost, instead undertaking to clean up the site and create a 'water park'. After remediation of the harmful chemical residues from the fertilizer operation the site was converted into a 86 acres (35 ha) county part, Water's Edge, (Note: 53.69406°N 0.43218°W, Water's Edge country park (former clay pits, and fertilizer plant)) incorporating the worked out clay pits as reed beds.

Tile and brickyards east of Barton Haven which were abandoned in the 1950s now form part of the 100 acres (40 ha) Far Ings National Nature Reserve, (Note: 53.69543°N 0.46907°W, Far Ings Nature Reserve (former clay pits)) established in 1983 by the Lincolnshire Wildlife Trust.

From 2013/4 Leggott's (or Ferriby) quarry has been reused as an airsoft recreation site.

== See also ==
- Fos-sur-Mer (France), Europoort (Netherlands) – similar estuarine areas with post war industrial development
