= North Killingholme =

Village in Lincolnshire, England

Coordinates: 53.6404°N 0.2750°W

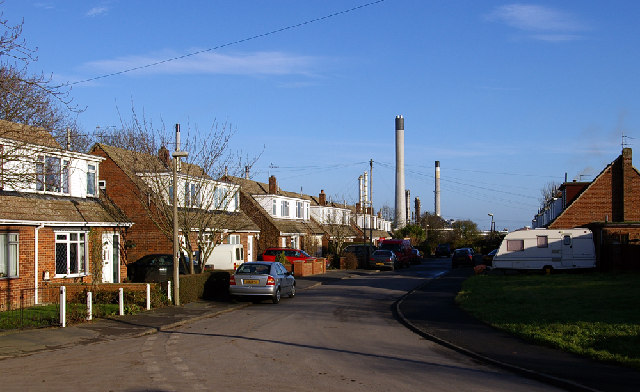
- St Crispins Close (2006)

- Location within Lincolnshire
- Population: 292 (2011 census)
- OS grid reference: TA141174
  - London: 150 mi (240 km) S
- Civil parish: North Killingholme
- Unitary authority: North Lincolnshire
- Ceremonial county: Lincolnshire
- Region: Yorkshire and the Humber
- Country: England
- Sovereign state: United Kingdom
- Post town: IMMINGHAM
- Postcode district: DN40
- Dialling code: 01469
- Police: Humberside
- Fire: Humberside
- Ambulance: East Midlands
- UK Parliament: Brigg and Immingham

North Killingholme is a small village and civil parish in North Lincolnshire, England.

Situated on the southern bank of the Humber Estuary north-west of Grimsby, Killingholme is divided into two administrative districts, to its south being the civil parish of South Killingholme.

The harbour of North Killingholme Haven, and the Humber Sea Terminal (2000–) are in the northern part of the parish, on the banks of the Humber Estuary. The Lindsey Oil Refinery (1968–), and the Killingholme A and Killingholme B power stations (1990s–) are in the parish, north-east of the village.

South Killingholme village is located south-west of the oil refinery – it is small in both area and population – the church of St Denys dates from the Middle Ages, and adjacent are the remains of two moated sites, formerly belonging to the Booth family who were lords of the manor and patrons of the living of Killingholme until Victorian times.

The former RAF North Killingholme is in the southern part of the civil parish, built and used during the Second World War.

== Geography ==
The parish of North Killingholme extends from the Humber Estuary foreshore roughly south-west through Lindsey Oil Refinery; the village of North Killingholme; and the former RAF North Killingholme to a boundary with the civil parish of Ulceby formed by the canalized water course, Skitter Beck. The parish is roughly 3.7 miles (6 km) long (north-west to south-east) and 1.2 miles (2 km) wide, widening to 2.5 miles (4 km) wide at the banks of the Humber. The drain outfall, harbour and port of North Killingholme Haven is in the northernmost corner of the parish on the Humber banks. To the south-east is the civil parish of South Killingholme; to the north-west is the civil parish of East Halton.

North Killingholme is low-lying land, rising slowly from less than 16 feet (5 m) above sea level near the Humber to maxima of over 33 feet (10 m) to the south-western edges. A local peak of 56 feet (17 m) is found close to the church in the middle of the parish.

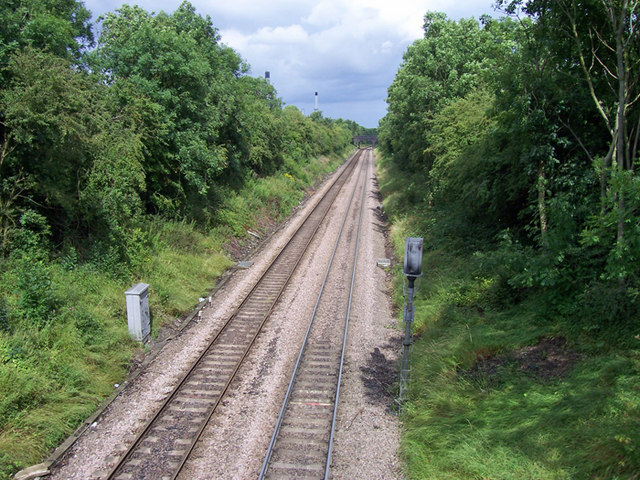
Rail lines for Immingham and refineries passing through the parish (2009)

Approximately 50% of the land area of the parish is in industrial or logistical use: land in industrial use includes the Humber Sea Terminal at North Killingholme Haven; the Lindsey Oil Refinery, and its two power stations adjacent north-west of the site (see Killingholme A and Killingholme B); as well as industrial estate development near the disused former RAF airfield. Much of the remainder of the parishes land is in agricultural use, with regular enclosed fields drained by man made channels. Additionally there is a nature reserve at North Killingholme Haven, a former clay extraction pit; some small woods; and the small village of North Killingholme. A branch line for the Immingham Dock (formerly the Humber Commercial Railway) runs through the parish near the southern boundary, and also serves the oil refinery via sidings.

The parish had a population of 224 at the 2001 census, and at the 2011 census a population of 292. The parish is in the Ferry ward of North Lincolnshire. South Killingholme village is the only habitation of any note in the parish.

== History ==
The name Killingholme is Swedish and translates into 'Goat kid islet'. There are numerous 'Killingholme' and 'Killingholmen' in Sweden, as well as in Finland (which for 700 years was part of Sweden).

There is evidence of human settlement in the Killingholme area dating to the pre-historical period – Neolithic stone axes were found close to the village in the late 1890s; from the Iron Age/Roman period part of a stone quern has been found in land between North and South Killingholme.

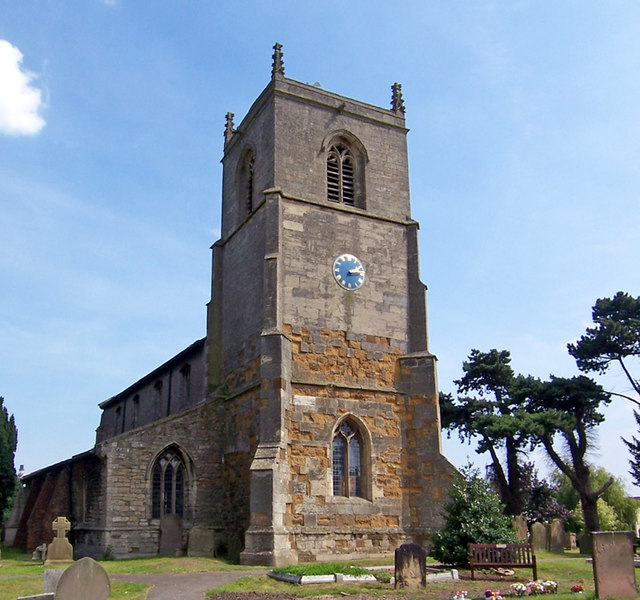
St Denys' Church, Killingholme (2007)

The church of St Denys dates at the earliest to the Norman period, with a 12th-century priest's door, as well as the arch at the base of the tower. The chancel is 13th-century, and the nave 14–15th century, with a clerestory added in the 16–17th century. The church was built mainly of limestone and ironstone, with brick, chalk, flint and rubble work, and some ashlar dressing. The church was restored in the 1700s, 1847, 1868, 1889, 1910 and 1926 including a new chancel arch, and brick buttresses. The font is 14th-century. (Note: The present vicarage to the church dates to the mid 1800s and is listed.)

Approximately 0.6 miles (1 km) north of the village is the medieval moated site known as North Garth, with an inner 'island' 131 by 66 feet (40 by 20 m), and moats of 20 feet (6 m) wide and 3.3 to 4.9 feet (1 to 1.5 m) deep. To the south are further enclosures, also ditched or moated to a depth of 3.3 feet (1 m). (Note: Both moated sites are scheduled monuments)

The site of the deserted medieval village of Holtham (TA 1477 1675) may lie approximately halfway between North and South Killingholme.

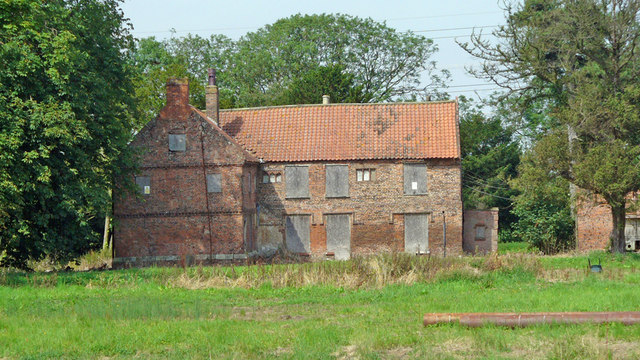
Killingholme Manor Farm (2007)

A second moated site is found around Manor Farm, consisting of two areas. The larger, 790 by 590 feet (240 by 180 m), has a moat of around 32.8 by 6.6 feet (10 by 2 m) wide by deep, still water filled in parts; a smaller moated area of 160 feet (50 m) square is in the north-west corner of the first with its northern and western moats formed by the outer moat. A red brick and pantile farmhouse (former manor house, where the Booths were seated until the 18th century) within the site dates to the 1500s (east wing), with a west wing added in the 17th century. The older wing is thought to be the remains of a larger manor house. (White 1872) states the old house was thought to date to the reign of Henry VII, though current thought places what remains of it in the reign of Elizabeth I. To the east a stables/granary dates to the mid 1700s.

Both North and South Killingholme were enclosed in 1779 when the Booth family were lords of the manor. In 1821 the parish of North Killingholme, including the hamlet of South Killingholme, had a population of 438. By 1872 the parish contained 770 persons of which 196 were in North Killingholme. In this period (1880s) the parish was almost entirely agricultural, excluding a small brick and tile works near North Killingholme Haven; almost all of the agricultural land was regular enclosed fields; there were two small woods, Burkinshaw's Covert and Chase Hill Wood, north-east of the village. Excluding the developments on the Humber Bank at the Haven the general situation in the parish remained unchanged to the Second World War, with only minor growth of the village – a subsidiary development of a few houses to the south-west of the village centre, named Garden Village.

At North Killingholme Haven clay extraction for cement manufacture took place from 1909 to 1913. Additionally a pier for fuelling Royal Navy ships was constructed c. 1912; and a seaplane base opened nearby in 1914 and closed 1919. (see also RNAS Killingholme)

As part of the development of the Immingham Dock, a branch line, the Humber Commercial Railway (operational 1901), was constructed from a junction near Ulceby railway station running northeast through the parish towards the new dock.

An airfield was established southwest of the village during the Second World War, and used extensively by heavy bomber squadrons. (See RAF North Killingholme) Much of the airfield was built during the Second World War including the three concrete runways, and hangars, storehouses and offices. Additionally two heavy anti-aircraft batteries were sited in the parish during the Second World War.

In the post Second World War period much of the land near the Humber north-west of Grimsby was developed for heavy or large scale industrial use. (see Industry of the South Humber Bank.) The "Lindsey Oil Refinery" was developed by Total Oil and Fina north-east of the village of North Killingholme from 1968. The village was relatively unchanged by these developments, though the number of dwellings had roughly doubled by the beginning of the 1970s, mainly scattered detached and semi-detached houses.

In 1960 the CEGB acquired a 360 acres (146 ha) site near Killingholme, and in 1972 obtained consent for a 4 GW oil fired power station, some enabling construction work was begun, but the project was abandoned after the 1973 oil crisis. In 1985 the Killingholme site was listed as a possible NIREX disposal site for low level nuclear waste, causing substantial opposition both locally and from the then Humberside County Council. In 1986 the CEGB listed Killingholme as a potential site for a coal fired power station. In 1992 Powergen constructed a 900 MW combined cycle gas fired powerstation north of the Lindsey Oil Refinery, known as Killingholme B power station. In 1993 National Power selected the proposed oil powerstation site for a CCGT power station, the approximate 650 MW Killingholme A power station.

From the 1990s onwards a Roll-on/Roll-off ferry terminal, was constructed at the haven: the first two berths opened 2000; a second pair c. 2004; and a third pair after 2006. (see Humber Sea Terminal.)

By the 21st century housing development at village had completed infilling at the satellite Garden village, and created two continuous rows of houses near east of the traditional centre along St Crispin's Close and Church Lane, approximately 10 structures per side on each road, mostly semi-detached houses or higher status.

Booth coat of arms

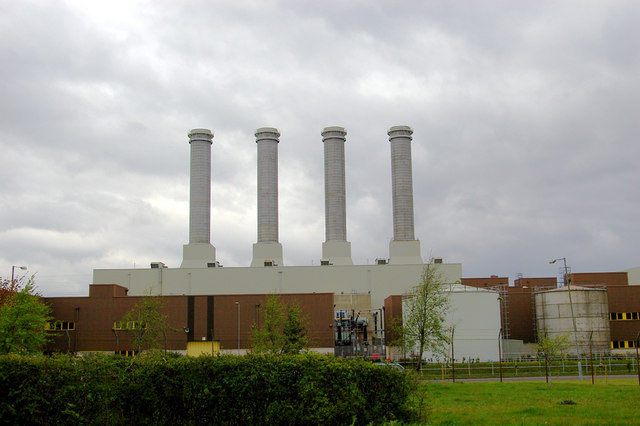
Killingholme B power station (2006)

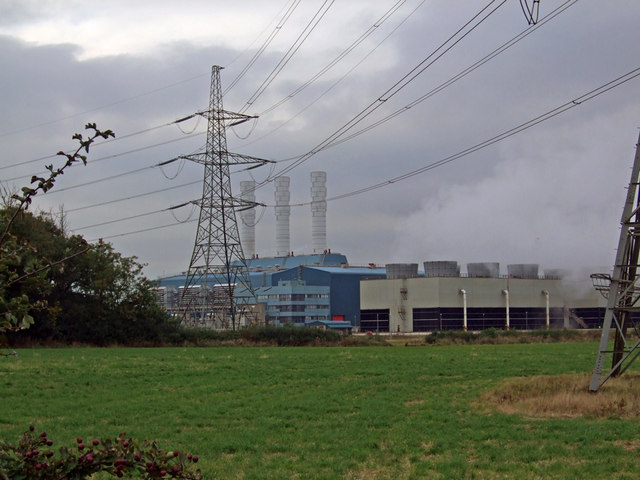
Killingholme A power station (2008)

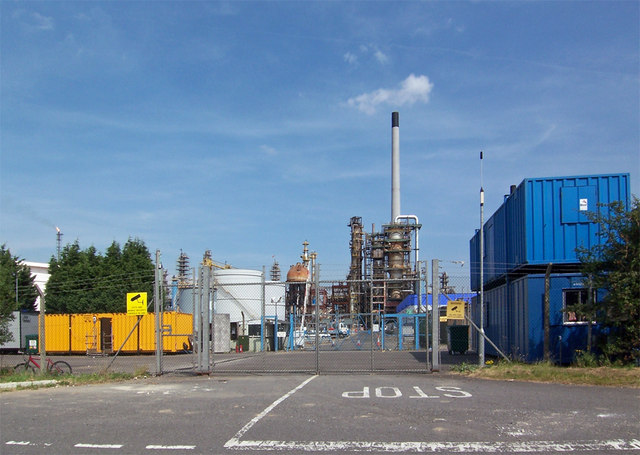
Part of the Lindsey oil refinery (2007)

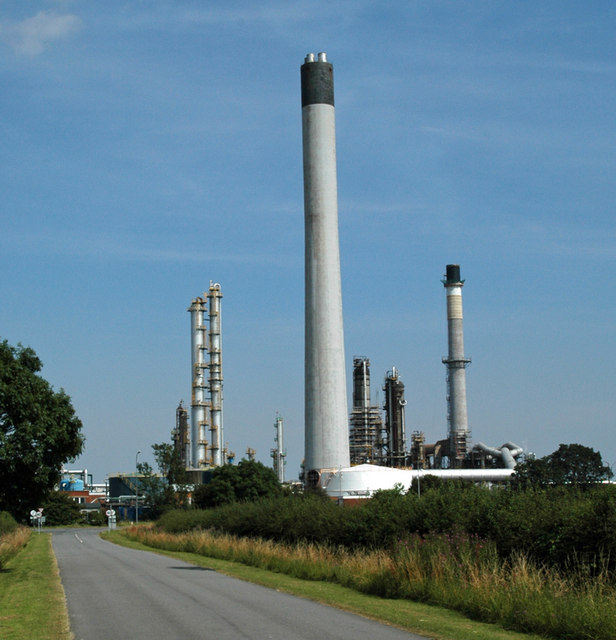
Part of the Lindsey oil refinery (2007)
