= RAF North Killingholme =

Former RAF station in Lincolnshire, England

RAF North Killingholme
- North Killingholme, Lincolnshire in England
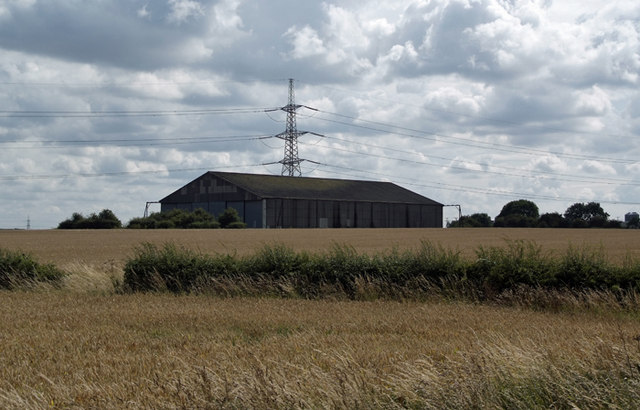
- Old hangar

Site information
- Type: Royal Air Force station
- Owner: Air Ministry
- Operator: Royal Air Force
- Controlled by: RAF Bomber Command

Location
- Shown within Lincolnshire RAF North Killingholme (the United Kingdom)
- Coordinates: 53°38′09″N 000°17′31″W

Site history
- Built: 1943
- In use: 1943 - 1945
- Battles/wars: European theatre of World War II

Airfield information
- Elevation: 8 metres (26 ft) AMSL
Runways
Direction	Length and surface
00/00	Asphalt
00/00	Asphalt
00/00	Asphalt

Royal Air Force North Killingholme or more simply RAF North Killingholme is a former Royal Air Force station located immediately west of the village of North Killingholme in North Lincolnshire, England.

The airfield was extensively used during the Second World War by Avro Lancaster bombers.

== History ==
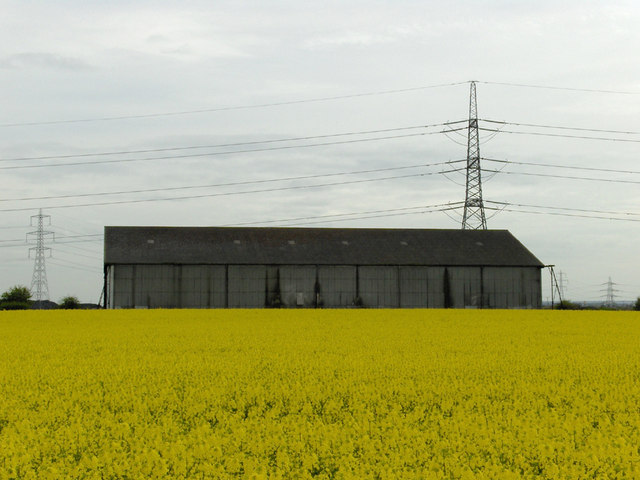
Old hangars

The RAF station opened in November 1943 and became fully operational in January 1944 when 550 Squadron moved there from RAF Waltham.

The station was with No. 1 Group RAF. No. 14 Base HQ was based at the airfield between 1944 and 1945.

It remained operational until October 1945. 550 squadron was the only squadron to be based at North Killingholme and flew only Avro Lancasters.

== Current use ==
After North Killingholme closed, the land reverted to agriculture use, but the layout of the station is very easy to see from aerial photographs.

There is the North Killingholme Industrial Estate on the site along with a large depot for Volvo construction equipment.

== See also ==
- List of former Royal Air Force stations
- RAF Kirmington, a nearby airfield, later became Humberside Airport.
