= No. 550 Squadron RAF =

Former flying squadron of the Royal Air Force

- Badge of 550 Squadron
- Active: 25 Nov 1943 – 31 Oct 1945
- Country: United Kingdom
- Branch: Royal Air Force
- Role: Bomber
- Mottos: Latin: Per Ignem Vincimus (Translation: "Through fire we conquer")

Insignia
- Squadron Badge heraldry: In front of flames of fire a sword erect point upwards. The badge is symbolic of the squadron's power to force its way through barrage of fire and fighter opposition to drop its bombs. It can also be taken as symbolic of the squadron's raids with both incendiary and high-explosive bombs.
- Squadron Codes: BQ (Nov 1943 – Oct 1945)

Aircraft flown
- Bomber: Avro Lancaster; Four-engined heavy bomber

No. 550 Squadron RAF was a heavy bomber squadron of the Royal Air Force during World War II. Formed at RAF Waltham on 25 November 1943, 550 Squadron flew Avro Lancaster bombers as part of No. 1 Group RAF. In early 1944, the squadron was moved to RAF North Killingholme, Lincolnshire where it continued operations until May 1945, when it began dropping food over the Netherlands as a relief effort as part of Operation Manna. The squadron was disbanded on 31 October 1945. Today, a surviving Lancaster bomber continues to fly in the markings of BQ-B "Phantom of the Ruhr" EE139 from 550 squadron as part of the Battle of Britain Memorial Flight.

== History ==
=== Operation Banquet ===
Before standing up as an operational bomber unit 550 Squadron was allocated to the Air Fighting Development Unit under 'Operation Banquet' anti-invasion plans.

=== Formation at RAF Waltham ===
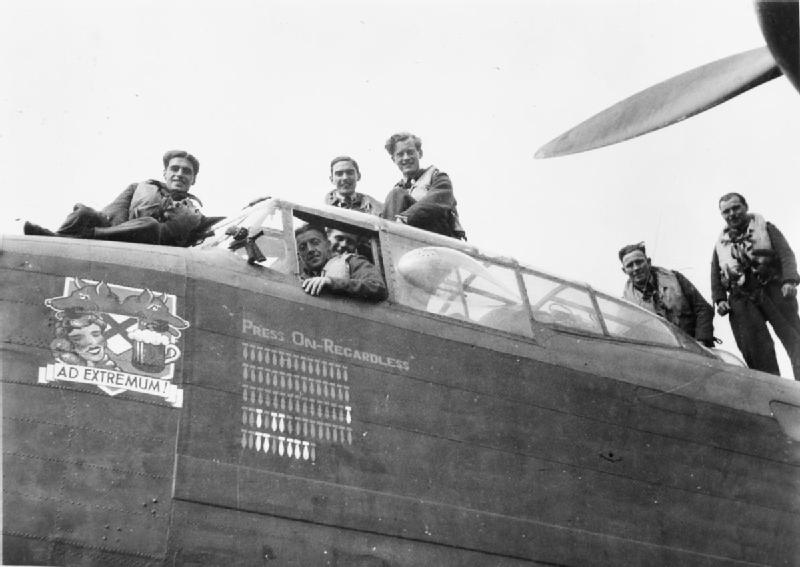
550 Squadron aircrew with Lancaster "Press on Regardless" at RAF North Killingholme

No. 550 squadron was formed at RAF Waltham (near Grimsby), Lincolnshire on 25 November 1943 from 'C' Flight of 100 Squadron. Equipped with Avro Lancasters, they began operating in the same month, as part of No. 1 Group RAF. The squadron's commanding officer, until 17 May 1944, was Wing Commander James Johnson Bennett. The squadron motto was "Per Ignem Vincimus", (Latin: through fire we conquer).

From RAF Waltham, No. 550 Squadron attacked seven times, and also took part in raids on Leipzig and Frankfurt. On 26/27 November 1943, 8 of their Lancasters were dispatched to make bombing runs over Berlin; 7 succeeded, and one failed to return.

=== RAF Killinghome ===
On 3 January 1944 the squadron was moved to RAF North Killingholme, Lincolnshire, where it continued operations. No. 550 Squadron flew their first mission from North Killingholme on 14 January 1944: eleven Lancasters participated in a raid on Brunswick.

No. 550 Squadron grew in size to two flights and later to three. It became one of the most efficient squadrons in Bomber Command, on a number of occasions reaching the top of the No. 1 Group RAF Group bombing league table. Losses were relatively low, as was the rate of aborted missions, a good indication of high morale.

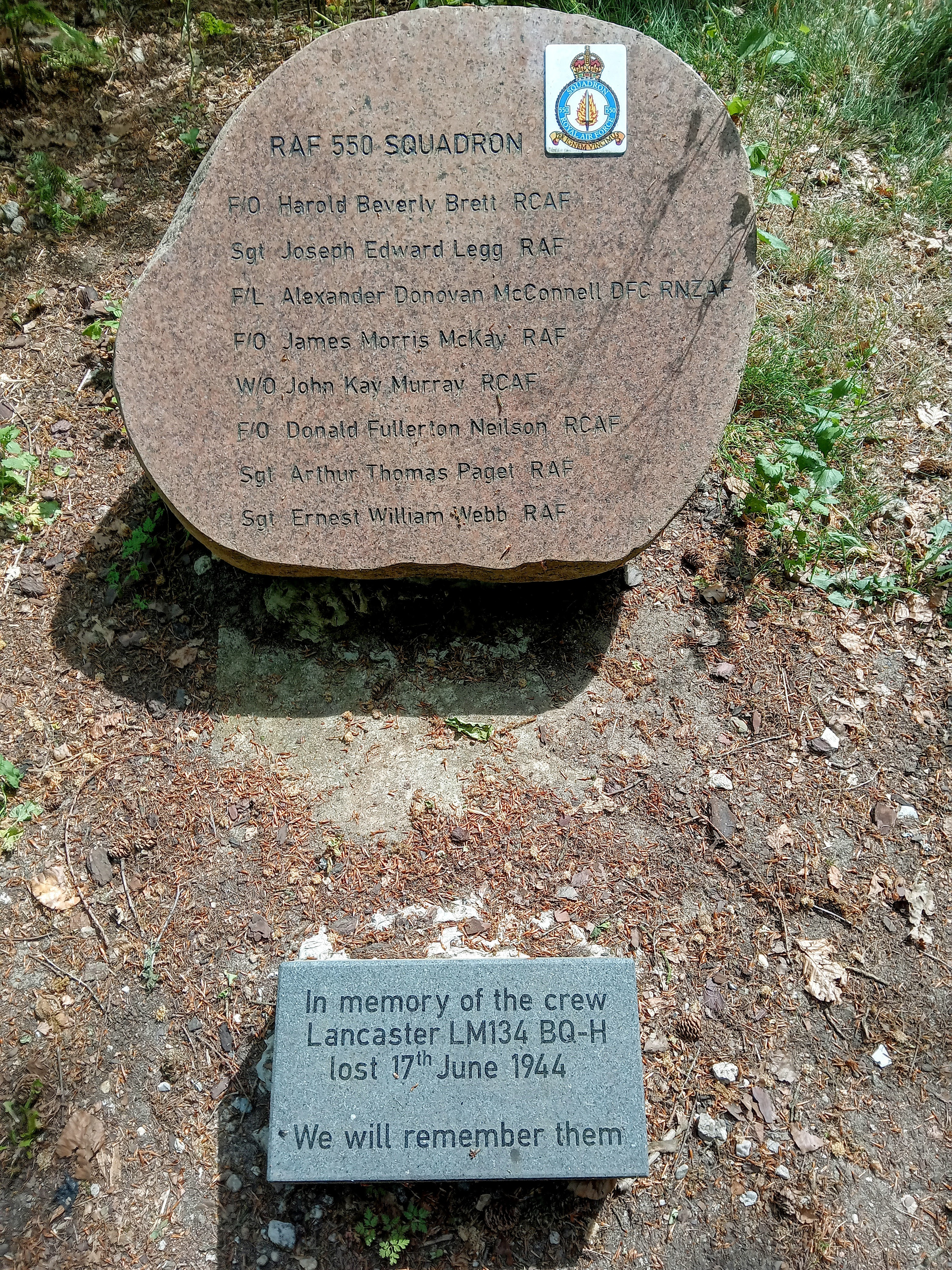
Memorial for the crew of the LM 134 BQ-H, lost 17 June 1944 near Rhenen, The Netherlands.

From January 44 until 26 May 1945 the squadron adjutant was Christopher Walter Waitt, who had served with the Royal Flying Corps in WW1 and had been awarded the Military Medal.

A notable member was wireless operator F/Sgt Brian Todd, who flew 14 sorties in early 1944 with A Flight Commander S/Ldr Peter Nicholas. He later became a famous comedian as Bob Todd, playing the slapstick sidekick to Benny Hill.

On 5 June 1944, No. 550 Squadron participated in the D-Day landings; their Lancaster LL811 J-Jig "Bad Penny II" was credited with dropping the first string of bombs at 11.34pm.

On 25 April 1945, No. 550 Squadron flew their last combat mission of the war: 23 Lancasters participated in the Bombing of Obersalzberg.

During the course of the war, No. 550 Squadron completed 3,582 operational sorties with the Lancaster, losing 59 aircraft. The squadron dropped 16,195 tons of bombs. Three of No. 550 Squadron's Lancaster bombers succeeded in flying more than 100 combat missions, BQ-F "Press on Regardless" ED905, BQ-V 'The Vulture Strikes' PA995, and—the best-known—BQ-B "Phantom of the Ruhr" EE139, which flew 121 missions.

No. 550 Squadron dropped food over the Netherlands as a relief effort as part of 29 April – 7 May 1945 Operation Manna.

=== After the war ===
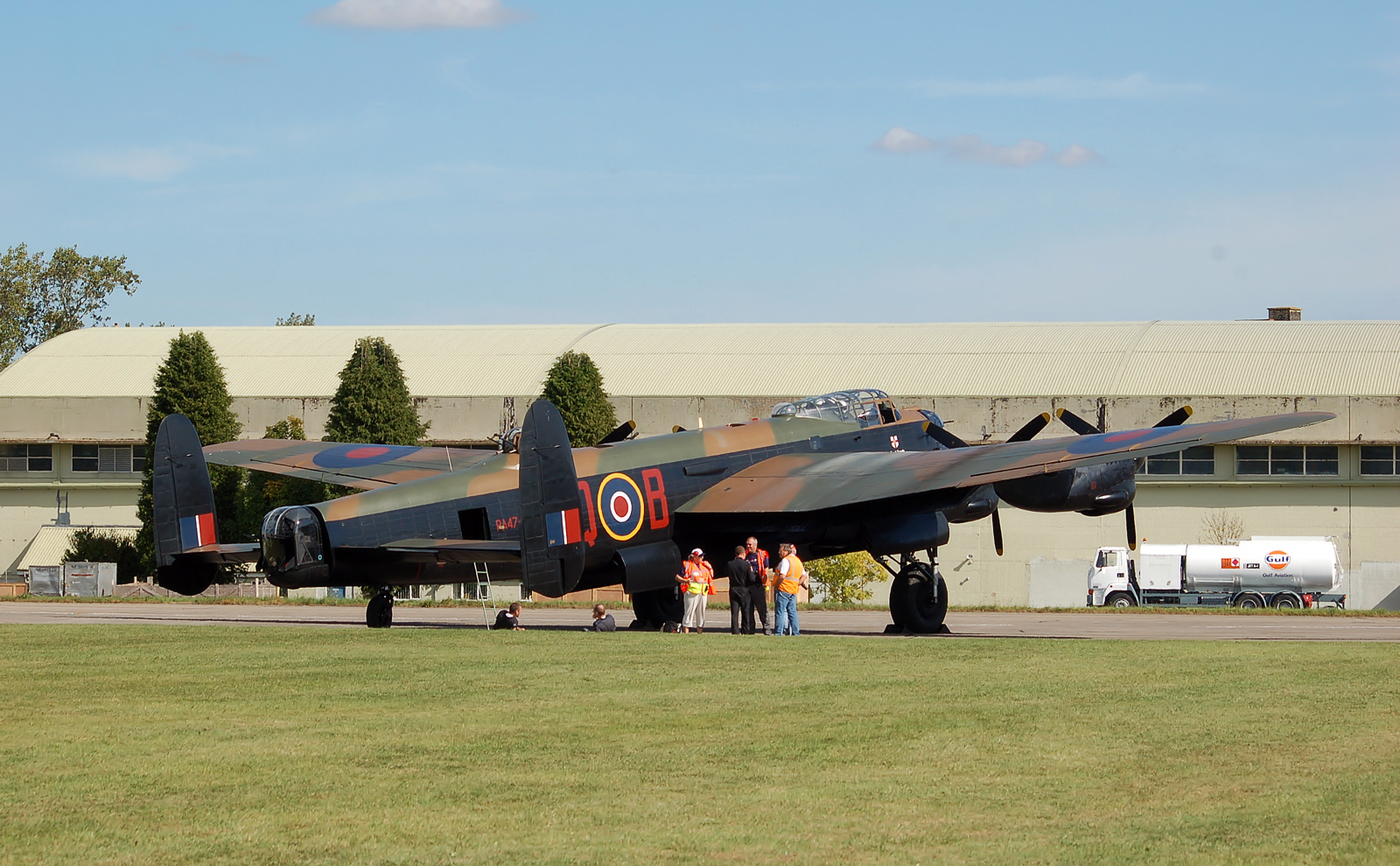
Battle of Britain Memorial Flight Lancaster B1 bomber in the markings of No 550 squadron on one side (BQ-B) and No 100 squadron on the other (HW-R).

Germany surrendered on 8 May 1945. North Killingholme closed and No. 550 Squadron was disbanded on 31 October 1945.

Today, the Battle of Britain Memorial Flight Lancaster is painted in the colours of BQ-B "Phantom of the Ruhr" EE139.

== Aircraft operated ==
Aircraft operated by No. 550 Squadron RAF
From	To	Aircraft	Version
November 1943	October 1945	Avro Lancaster	Mks.I, III

=== Notable aircraft ===
Three of the Lancasters that flew with 550 Squadron managed to fly one hundred operations or more, and another nearly did:

No. 550 Squadron RAF aircraft with the most number of operations
Serial no.	Name	Operations	Call-sign	Fate	Remarks
EE139	"Phantom of the Ruhr"	121	BQ-B	Scrapped 19-02-1946	Also flew with No. 100 Squadron RAF. Current Battle of Britain Memorial Flight; Lancaster flies BQ-B call-sign.
PA995	"The Vulture Strikes"	101	BQ-V	Failed to return, 07-03-1945	Flew all missions with 550 Squadron
ED905	"Ad Extremum/Press on Regardless"	100+	BQ-F	Crashed 20-08-1945 with No. 1656 Conversion Unit	Also flew with No. 103 Squadron RAF and No. 166 Squadron RAF
W5005	"SS-Nan"	94	BQ-N	Ditched in Humber Estuary 26/27-08-1944	Also flew with No. 460 Squadron RAAF

== Squadron bases ==
Bases and airfields used by No. 550 Squadron RAF
From	To	Base
25 November 1943	3 January 1944	RAF Waltham, Lincolnshire
3 January 1944	31 October 1945	RAF North Killingholme, Lincolnshire
