= RAF Grimsby =

RAF bomber aerodrome

RAF Grimsby Waltham
- Waltham, Lincolnshire in England
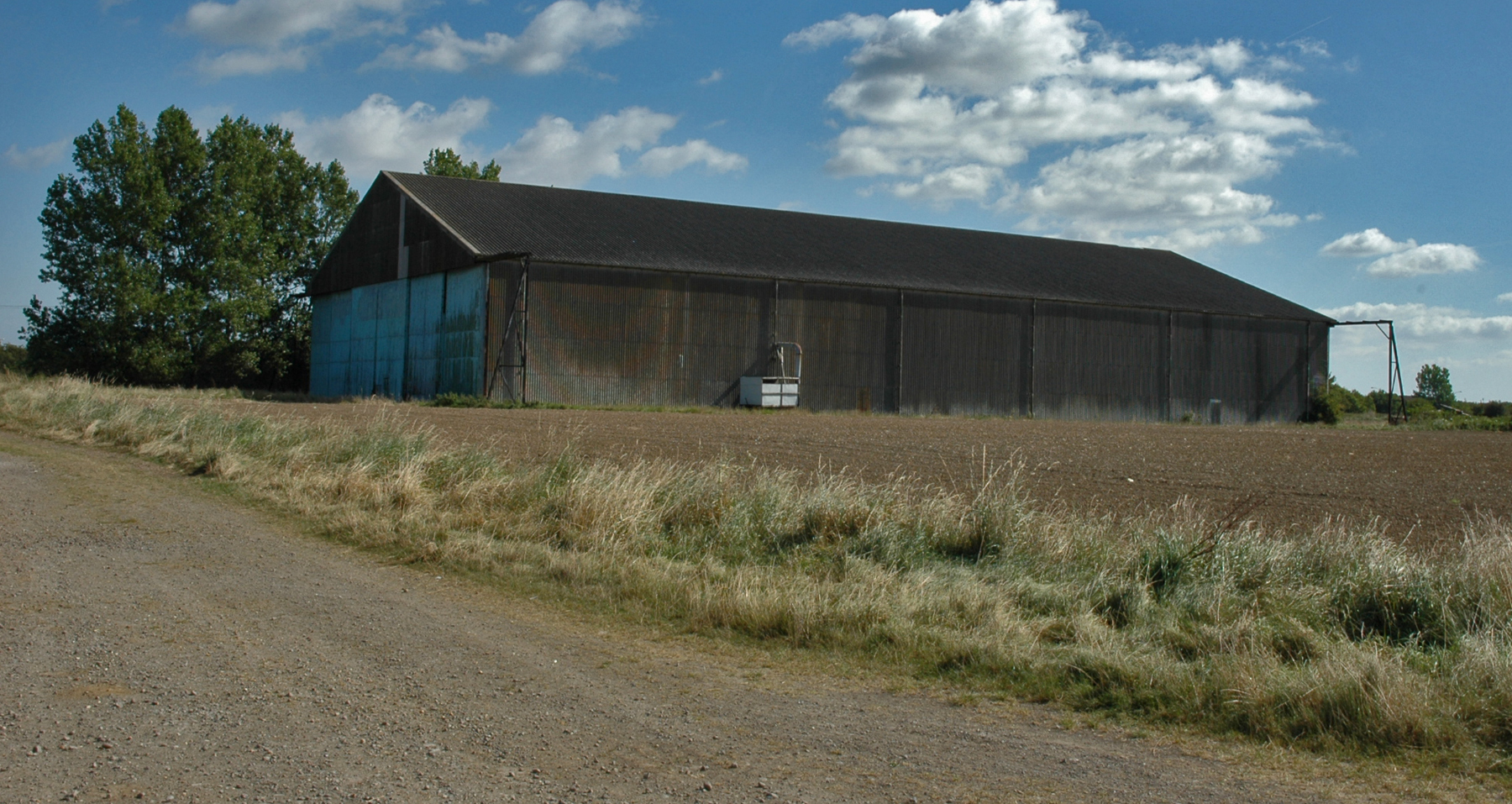
- Surviving B1 hangar

Site information
- Type: RAF station 1941-43; 12 Base substation 1943-
- Code: GY
- Owner: Air Ministry
- Operator: Royal Air Force
- Controlled by: RAF Bomber Command * No. 1 Group RAF

Location
- Shown within Lincolnshire RAF Grimsby (the United Kingdom)
- Coordinates: 53°30′11″N 000°04′56″W

Site history
- Built: 1941
- Built by: John Laing & Son Ltd; Gee, Walker & Slater Ltd
- In use: November 1941 - 1946
- Battles/wars: European theatre of World War II

Airfield information
- Elevation: 72 feet (22 m) AMSL
Runways
Direction	Length and surface
18/36	6,000 feet (1,829 m) Concrete/Tarmac
12/30	4,200 feet (1,280 m) Concrete/Tarmac
06/24	4,200 feet (1,280 m) Concrete/Tarmac

Royal Air Force Grimsby or more simply RAF Grimsby is a former Royal Air Force station located near Grimsby, Lincolnshire, England. The site was operational during the Second World War as part of RAF Bomber Command initially as a satellite station for the Vickers Wellington bombers of RAF Binbrook. By early 1943 the station was equipped with Avro Lancaster bombers of No. 100 Squadron RAF.

Although the station was officially called RAF Grimsby, servicemen and locals referred to it as Waltham, the name of the nearby village Waltham.

== History ==
=== Inter war years ===
Flying began at Waltham in 1933 when a grassed strip operated as Grimsby's municipal airport and a small aero club was formed. In preparation for war with Germany, in June 1938 the Air Ministry took control and established No. 25 Elementary and Reserve Flying Training School RAF, staffed with civilian instructors. At the outbreak of war on 3 September 1939, this unit was disbanded leaving the airfield empty.

=== Second World War ===
During 1940–41 the aerodrome was improved with the addition of concrete runways, hardstandings and hangars, ready to accommodate bombers of No. 1 Group RAF. It was initially a satellite airfield for nearby RAF Binbrook, with Vickers Wellington squadrons using RAF Grimsby as their preferred base as Binbrook only had grass runways at that time.

No. 142 Squadron RAF flying Wellingtons moved to the airfield in November 1941, remaining until December 1942. They were replaced by newly re-formed No. 100 Squadron RAF soon to be equipped with Avro Lancasters. In late 1943 personnel from 100 Squadron's C-Flight formed the nucleus of No. 550 Squadron RAF, making their initial sorties from RAF Grimsby before departing for nearby RAF North Killingholme.

The first operational sortie from RAF Grimsby for 100 Squadron was on the 4/5 March 1943. The squadron's Avro Lancaster bombers were sent on mine-laying sorties along the coasts of occupied Europe. Two Lancasters were lost. By the end of the war, 48 Vickers Wellingtons and 116 Avro Lancasters were lost.

=== Post-Second World War ===
In April 1945, with the end of the war in sight, No. 100 sqn moved out and the airfield returned to a quieter existence, with only the hangars in use by No. 35 Maintenance Unit RAF for storage. Over the next few years the facilities deteriorated and in 1952 the station was closed and ultimately sold off for a variety of uses including reverting to back to agricultural use. Years later the A16 was being improved and a bypass for the village of Holton-le-Clay cut into a large proportion of the station.

=== Memorials ===
Currently a memorial to 100 Squadron stands near the B1 hangar, next to the northern entrance to Holton-le-Clay. There is a memorial for 550 Squadron at the now disused station RAF North Killingholme and 142 Squadron is said to have a memorial in North Africa.

=== Buildings ===
Many of the airfield buildings still survive and are currently in use by a haulage firm and mechanics. Much of the original runway arrangement remains and is tarmaced. They have been painted with road markings in areas, for use with learner drivers, and provide a circuit regularly frequented by dog walkers. Out of the thirty plus dispersals built only one remains to this day. It is still possible to see the outlines of some from the air.

Notable surviving buildings include the control tower, crew locker and dryer rooms, the pre-war B1 and T2 hangars; however much of the station is in a state of disrepair and is also victim to fly-tipping. Old unused farm equipment also litters the station, it is overgrown with weeds and strewn with rubble.

A golf course, golf driving range and a go-karting track have been built on the station and a coal merchants stands on what was once the fuel dump. The bomb dump has totally disappeared and various buildings in the village of Waltham, Lincolnshire such as accommodation huts no longer exist. The only remaining building in the village is the Women's Auxiliary Air Force (WAAF) canteen and kitchen which currently house the Museum of Rural Life and RAF Grimsby Exhibition at the Waltham Windmill. This building has been extended.

== RAF Grimsby photographs ==
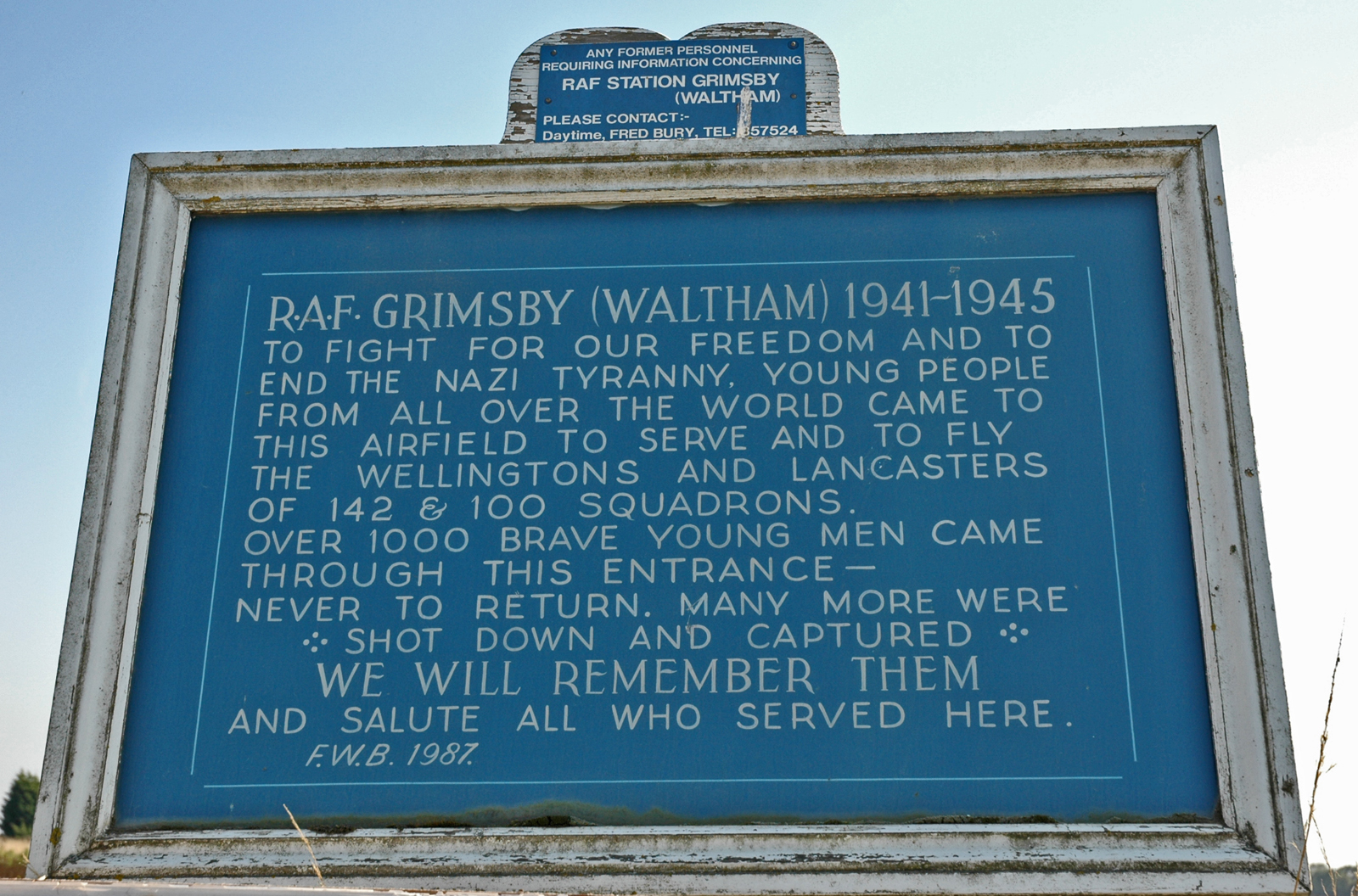
Notice located at the entrance to RAF Grimsby.

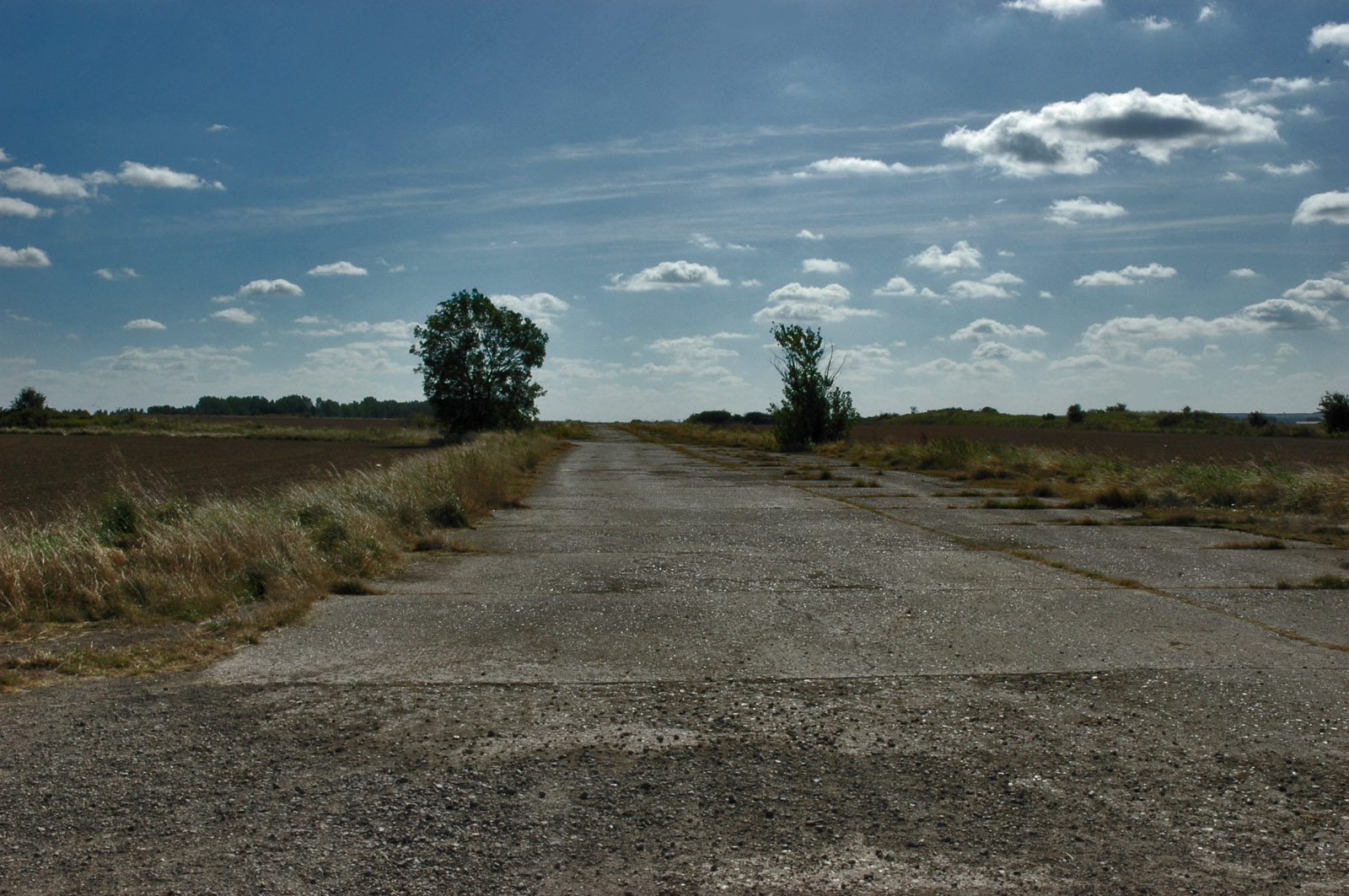
Perimeter track at north end of main runway.

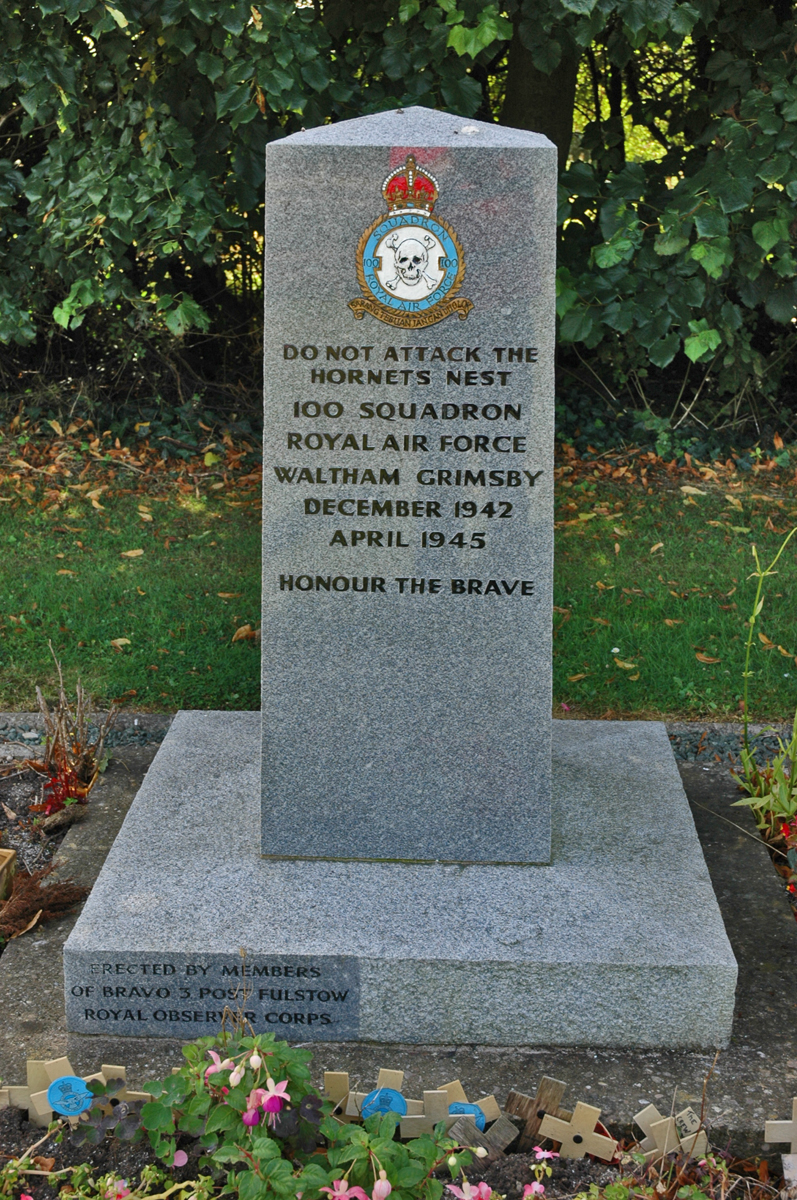
The RAF Grimsby memorial to 100 Squadron.

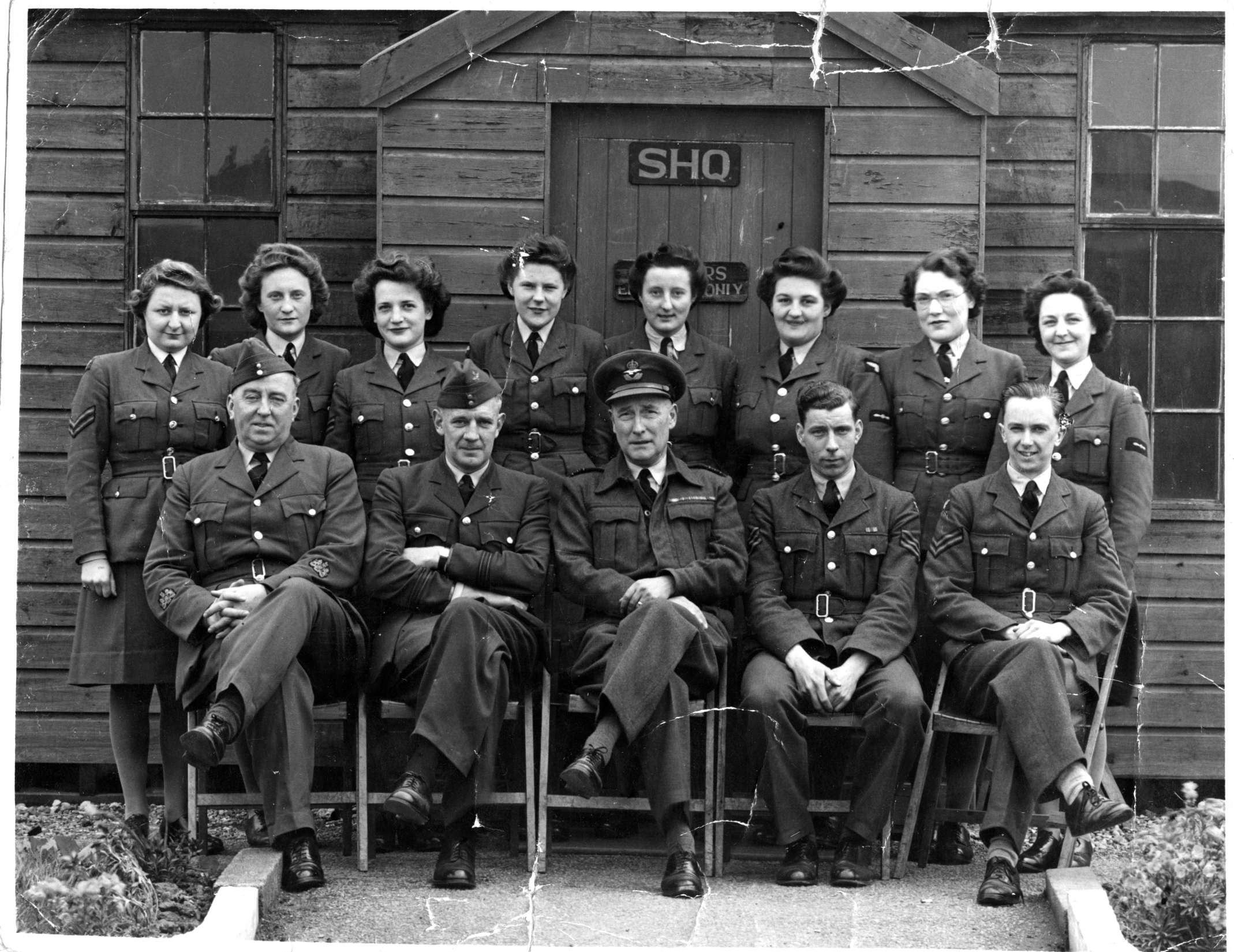
RAF Grimsby (Waltham) HQ personnel in 1943
