= British Titan Products =

British Titan Products was the manufacturer of Tioxide, a brand of white yet opaque pigment and whitening agent made from titanium dioxide. It was initially organised to replace titanium dioxide supplies that British paint manufacturers imported from Germany. This British industry was established as a joint venture in 1934 by two of the world's major mining and chemical businesses in conjunction with a major industrial consumer and a distribution business.

Tioxide became a wholly owned Imperial Chemical Industries subsidiary in 1992. Within ICI, now renamed after its principal product Tioxide, the business retained a separate identity, which it lost when sold in 1999 to Huntsman Corporation. In 2014 Huntsman companies, including Tioxide, together formed the world's second-largest producer of titanium dioxide, second to DuPont. This business did not manufacture titanium metal.

== Lead poisoning ==
White lead has been used as a pigment since the 4th century BC, even used in cosmetics, providing a pure white pigment with good coverage. The dangers to those who contacted lead were known but not properly understood, and often, but not always, led to lead poisoning.

Shortly before World War I, the US based National Lead Company told its stockholders it now took special care of its workers. Only adult men were employed, laundry services were provided without charge, and respirators were provided. Shower baths were provided, and the workmen were encouraged to wash before eating. It became generally recognised "lead has no business in the human body". Zinc oxides began to be used for white paints. Many countries banned the use of lead paints inside buildings. By the early 1930s lithopone titanium and zinc oxides were being marketed as non-poisonous.

Lead poisoning's great danger to children was not recognised until the 1940s when it was determined that small quantities which might cause chronic lead poisoning in mature adults could kill children.

== British Titan Products ==
Until 1934 titanium oxide was imported to Britain from Germany. Imperial Smelting Corporation, in association with US companies National Lead Company and its associate Titan Company, and Imperial Chemical Industries and Goodlass Wall and Lead Industries Limited together incorporated British Titan Products in 1933, and immediately began erection of a plant for the manufacture of titanium oxide at Billingham.

British Titan Products was incorporated as a private company owned jointly by:

- Imperial Smelting Corporation
- Imperial Chemical Industries
- Goodlass Wall and Lead Industries parent of British Australian Lead Manufacturers renamed 1955 BALM Paints and later Dulux
- Greeff-Chemicals Holdings distribution

Imperial Smelting took a 17 per cent interest. The plant began operating in July 1934 and further expansion was immediately begun. By the end of 1947 production was eight times the rate achieved in 1934.

By 1948 the ownership was:

- Consolidated Zinc 30.4%
- ICI 30.4%
- Lead Industries 30.4%
- Greeff Chemicals Holdings 8.9%

== White pigments for industry ==
In 1964 with plants in England, Canada, South Africa and Australia and sales in more than 70 different countries British Titan Products was able to advertise that it was the largest producer of titanium pigments in Europe with plants at Billingham and Grimsby, and research laboratories at Stockton. Tioxide pigments were then used in all kinds of paints (in 14 different grades of Tioxide), industrial finishes, floor coverings, plastics and rubber; in addition in artificial textiles, delicate paper and cosmetics particularly soaps. They were also employed in vitreous enamels on whiteware and baths, printing inks and pale leathers and their polishes.

== Tioxide International ==
Between 1956 and 1966 production capacity was lifted from 100,000 tons a year to 162,000 tons. There was now a British labour force of 2,660 and another 1,300 in its Tioxide International plants in Australia (making Austiox), South Africa, Canada, France (Tioxide SA) and Sierra Leone. The factories took supplies from BTP mines around the world.

Plants were added in Calais and Greatham, County Durham and BTP claimed to be the second largest producer of titanium dioxide in the world.

== Tioxide Group ==
British Titan Pigments became Tioxide Group at the beginning of 1976. when its ownership was:

- ICI 43.6%
- Lead Industries later Cookson Group and Vesuvius 43.6%
- Greeff Chemicals Holdings now Federated Chemical Holdings 12.8% (Note: Federated Chemical Holdings Limited a holding company controlling and co-ordinating a group engaged in chemical, pharmaceutical and mineral distribution, trading processing and manufacturing The Times 8 June 1977 page 19) later part of International Nickel Company and now known as Vale Canada

== Plants added ==
- 1949 at Heybridge, Tasmania. Australian Titan Products Pty Ltd
- 1948 Grimsby, England
- 1958 expansion at Grimsby and Billingham, Heybridge and India
- 1959 expansion in India and Australia
- 1959 South Africa
- 1959 Canada
- 1963 Sorel-Tracy, Canada
- 1964 Calais, France
- 1970 Greatham, England
- 1976 Huelva, Spain
- 1992 Malaysia

== Western Mineral Sands ==
Initially a two-thirds investment with the other third held by Westralian Oil. A miner of the mineral sand deposits which it turns into marketable ilmenite and synthetic rutile. In 1977 a cash issue of shares to Tioxide Australia gave them a 40 per cent shareholding. The remaining Tioxide Group holding of 44.6 per cent was sold by ICI to Australian investors in early 1994 and the business is now run by Iluka Resources.

== Greening ==
=== Cookson sells to ICI ===
Lead Industries Group changed its name back to Cookson in 1982 (and in late 2012 would change it again to Vesuvius). Faced by EU higher discharge standards requiring Cookson to stump up with its half share of Tioxide spending £90 million at Grimsby and Calais and also the forthcoming replacement of Tioxide's factories in Canada and Australia each to cost between £50 and £100 million Cookson sold its 50 per cent share of Tioxide to ICI for £160 million. The Grimsby modifications would cut the discharge of sulphuric acid and metal sulphates into the Humber.

On Tees-side ICI planned to spend £63 million on environmental protection for all its local operations. They had already completed seven reed beds where bacteria on the roots of the reeds consumed the liquid effluent from the Billingham plant. Tioxide had already fashioned a wetland area from rough grassland where waders and other wildfowl fed and roosted.

=== Joint venture with NL-Kronos ===
Environmental concerns at the Sorel-Tracy plant and at Becancour, Quebec persuaded ICI to join NL-Kronos in a new titanium dioxide plant at Lake Charles, Louisiana.

== ICI sale to Texas's Huntsman Corporation ==
In the mid 1990s ICI began a shedding process to transform itself from a commodity chemicals group to a speciality consumer group. Though they had originally planned to float it as an independent company for a yield about £700 million ICI was persuaded by trade interest to put the business up for sale. In 1999 ICI sold Tioxide to Huntsman Corporation for only £500 million. Sale contracts for £600 million to DuPont (without the purchase the world's largest producer of titanium dioxide) and later to NL Industries were each blocked by the Federal Trade Commission.
