= Killingholme A power station =

Former natural gas power station

Killingholme A Power Station
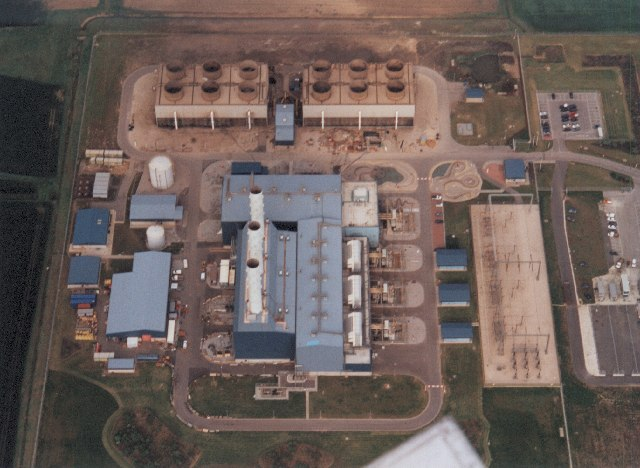
- Killingholme A from the air (1999)
- Country: England
- Location: Lincolnshire, East Midlands
- Coordinates: 53.65952°N 0.25511°W
- Commission date: 1994
- Decommission date: 2016
- Operators: National Power (1994–2000); NRG Energy (2000–2003); Centrica (2004–present)

Thermal power station
- Primary fuel: Natural gas

Power generation
- Nameplate capacity: 665 MW

External links
- Commons: Related media on Commons

Killingholme A Power Station was a combined‐cycle gas turbine natural gas power station within the civil parish of North Killingholme, in North Lincolnshire, Lincolnshire, England. The facility lies north of the Lindsey Oil Refinery, and adjacent to Killingholme B power station.

Killingholme A (665 MW) opened in 1994 and its final synchronisation took place in March 2016 with a combined station output of 635 MW.

== Construction ==
Three heat recovery steam generators were built by International Combustion at Derby (owned by NEI), costing £20 million. The project manager was Tim Enfield. The site was planned in April 1989.

Building began in January 1991, built by NEI ABB Gas Turbines Ltd.; NEI Parsons were from Newcastle. NEI built the steam turbines. In April 1993, a contract was signed to acquire gas from the Caister platform.

== Electricity ==
The site produced its first electricity in April 1993. The site was officially opened on Thursday 8 October 1993 by the National Power chairman, and the chief executive John Baker, with Tony Bethell. The whole site cost £250 million. The same design would be built in North Wales and Bedfordshire.

A 7 km line of 47 metre high pylons, with 30 towers was built near Ulceby, North Lincolnshire in September 1991 by Eve Transmission, which connected to the 4KG transmission line from Keadby to the Grimsby West substation.

== Specification ==
The power station used three Alstom GT-13D 145 MW gas turbines each with a heat recovery steam generator which lead to one Alstom 227 MW steam turbine. The power station was owned by Centrica and employed 52 people.

The plant opened in 1994 and was operated by National Power until 2000 when it was bought by NRG Energy for £390 million. It was then purchased in 2003 by a consortium of twenty banks when NRG got into financial difficulty and was then bought by Centrica in July 2004 for £142 million.

In early 2014, Centrica began to seek buyers for a number of its gas power plants, including its South Humber and Killingholme plants, and in early 2015, began discussion on the closure of the plant, having received no acceptable bids for the plant.

The plant was finally decommissioned in March 2016. Demolition of Killingholme A commenced in late 2017.

== Gallery ==
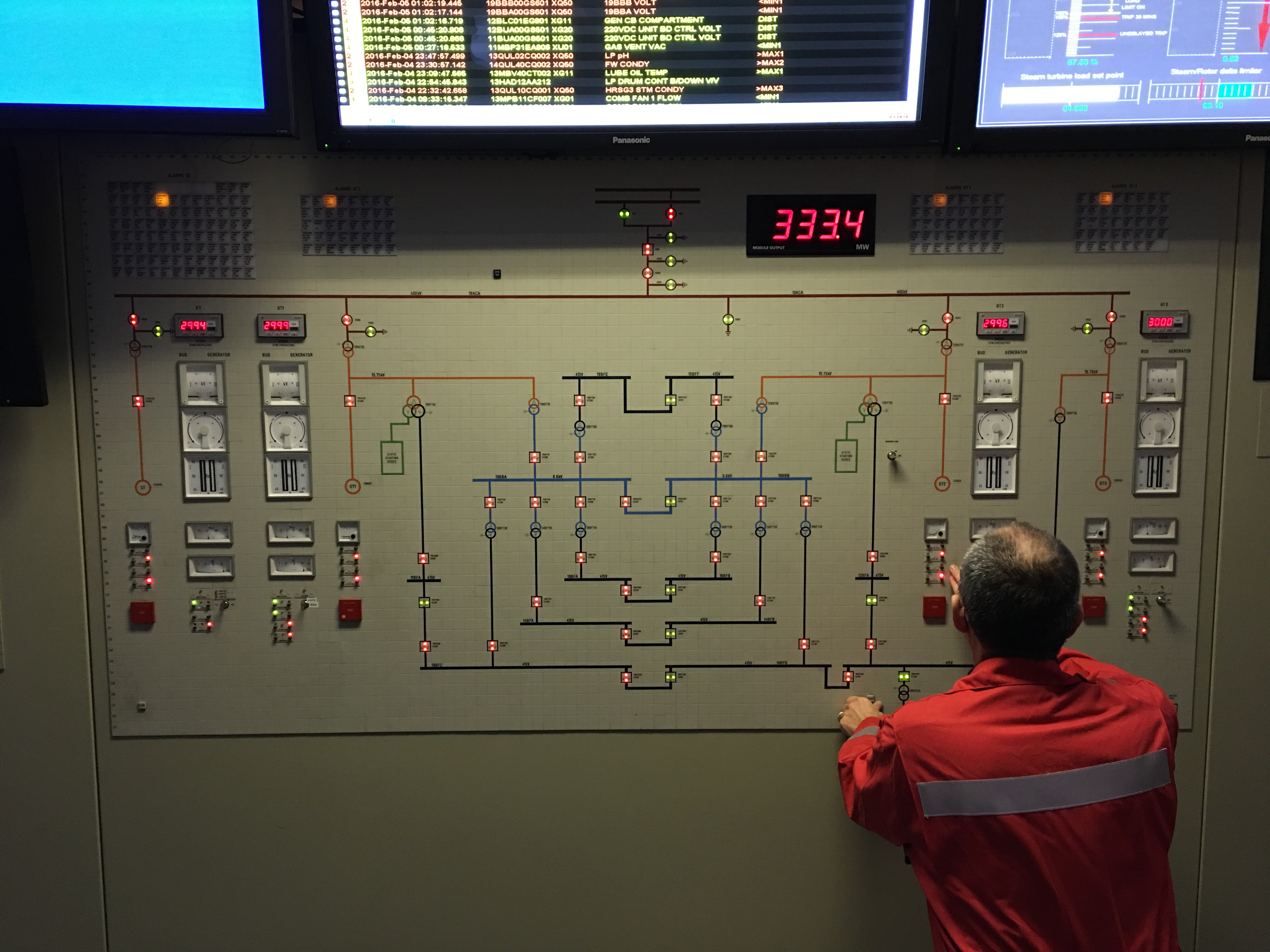
Automatic Voltage Regulator.

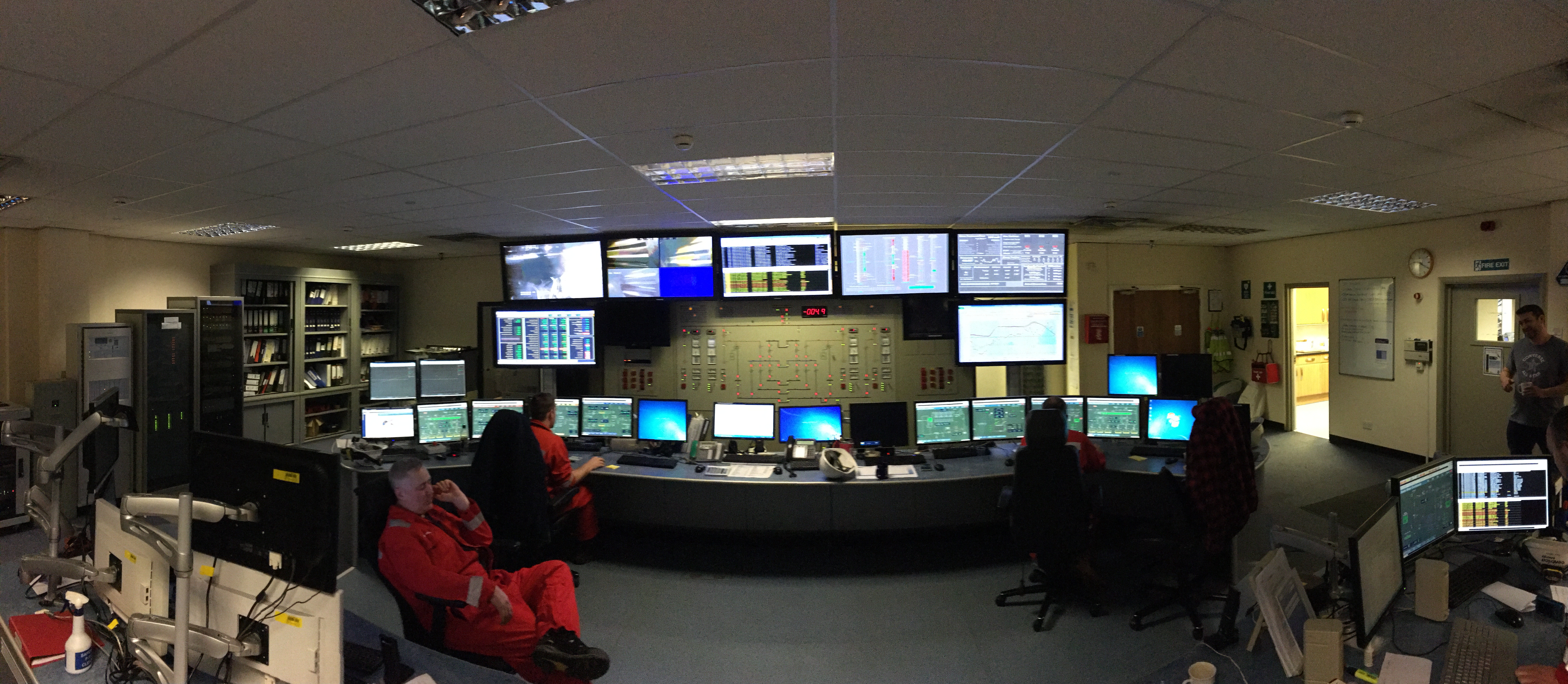
Killingholme A control room.

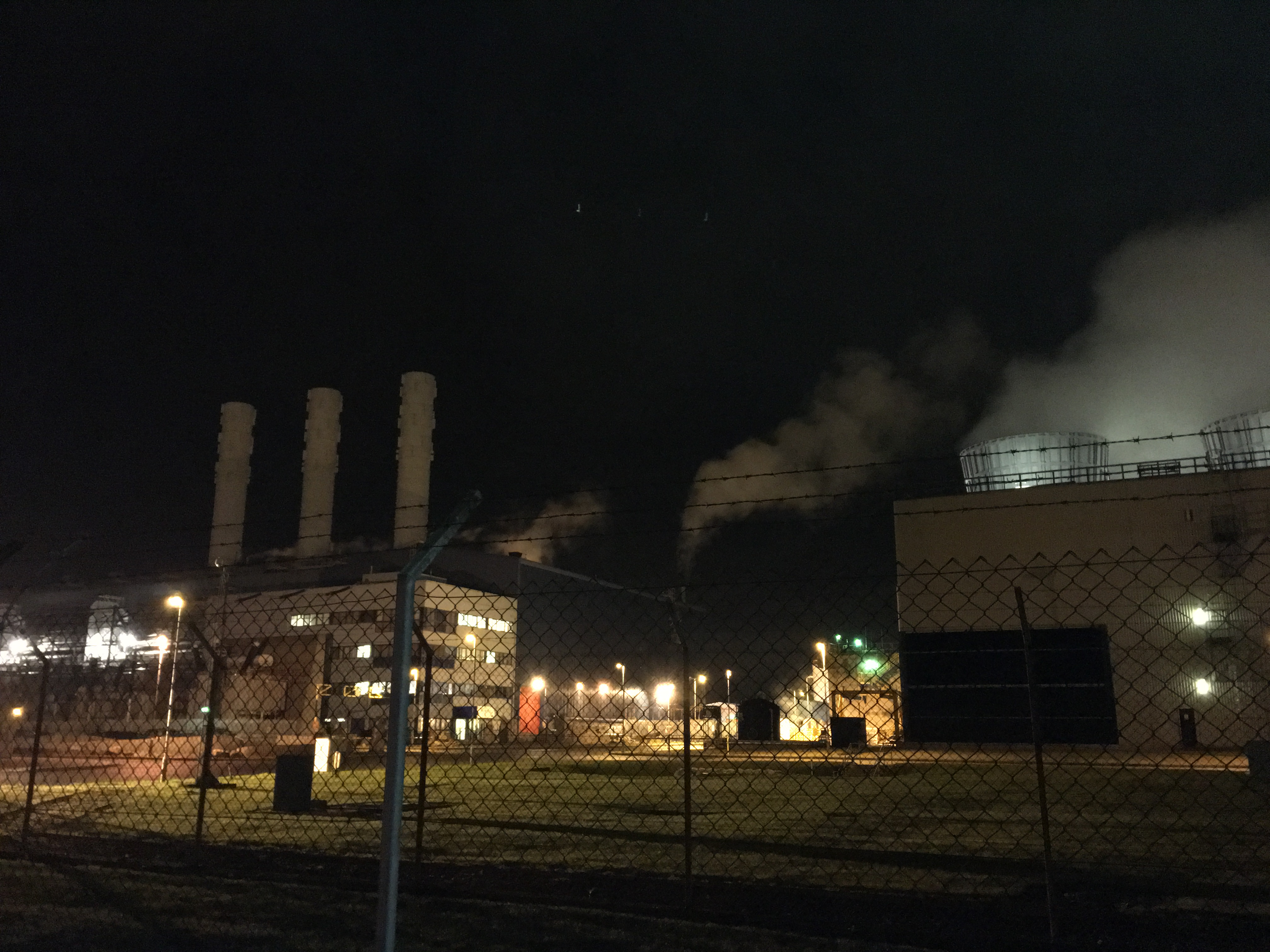
Killingholme A power station.

== See also ==
- Industry of the South Humber Bank
