= North Killingholme Haven =

Harbour in Lincolnshire, England

Coordinates: 53°39′51″N 0°14′07″W

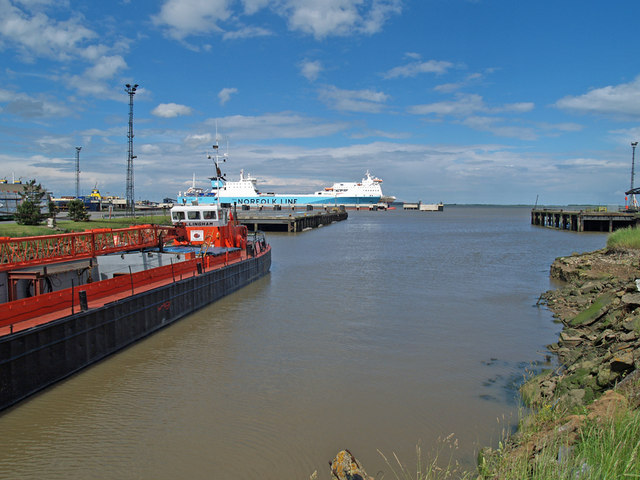
North Killingholme Haven, view north from the Haven towards the Humber Sea Terminal (2008)

North Killingholme Haven is a water outlet on the south bank of the Humber Estuary in the civil parish of North Killingholme, to the north-west of the Port of Immingham.

The area was used at the beginning of the 20th century for clay extraction with a jetty transhipping clay to Hull; in 1912 construction of a jetty for the Admiralty was consented, for fuel oil shipment. During the First World War a large seaplane facility was operated, known as RNAS Killingholme.

In the 1990s a Simon Group established a Roll on-Roll off river terminal at the Haven, known as Humber Sea Terminal; the terminal was expanded to six berths through the 1990s and 2000s.

== History ==
At the end of the 19th century North Killingholme Haven was used as a drainage point for networks of drainage canals in the fields in the North Killingholme area – the outfall of the waterway onto the Humber was sluiced. There was a single dwelling at the outfall – the New Inn.

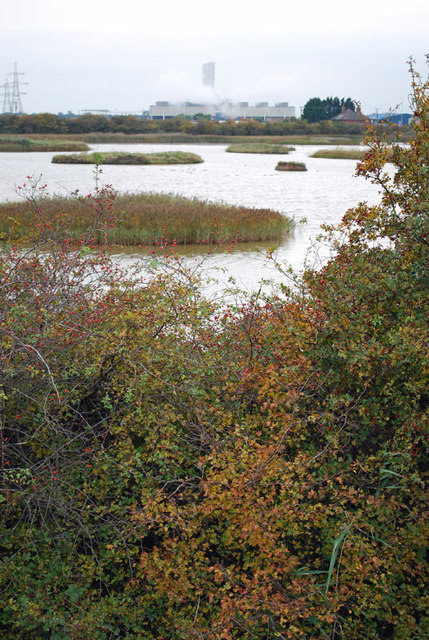
Former clay pits (2008)

Between 1909 and 1913 Earles Cement works in Wilmington was supplied with clay from pits at North Killingholme, shipped by barge. Clay dug by hand, and transported by horse, later steam winch and then narrow gauge locomotive to a jetty at the mouth of Killingholme Haven. The disused clay pits are since flooded and now form a saline lagoon habitat, with some scarce birds and invertebrates.

North Killingholme (Admiralty Pier) Act 1912
- Act of Parliament
- Parliament of the United Kingdom
- Long title: An Act to enable the Admiralty to construct and maintain a pier at North Killingholme on the River Humber and for purposes in connection therewith.
- Citation: 2 & 3 Geo. 5. c. clx

Dates
- Royal assent: 13 December 1912

Text of statute as originally enacted

North Killingholme (Admiralty Pier) Act 1931
- Act of Parliament
- Parliament of the United Kingdom
- Long title: An Act to authorise the Admiralty to construct and maintain certain works in connection with the pier constructed by them under the North Killingholme (Admiralty Pier) Act 1912 and for purposes connected with the matters aforesaid.
- Citation: 21 & 22 Geo. 5. c. lxiv

Dates
- Royal assent: 31 July 1931

Text of statute as originally enacted

Construction and extension of a pier at the haven was consented by the North Killingholme (Admiralty Pier) Act 1912 (2 & 3 Geo. 5. c. clx); The Admiralty's jetty was to be 800 by 20 feet (243.8 by 6.1 m) long by wide with a T-shaped head. The jetty was receiving oil by the mid 1910s. The North Killingholme (Admiralty Pier) Act 1931 (21 & 22 Geo. 5. c. lxiv) allowed the extension of the existing pier's head, replacing two sunken ships which had been used as dolphins at the head of the pier. The station soon became an important refuelling point for the Royal Navy. The oil storage site was served by the Killingholme Admiralty Platform station from 1930 to 1963.

North Killingholme Pier Act 1912
- Act of Parliament
- Parliament of the United Kingdom
- Long title: An Act to authorise the Yorkshire Transport Company Limited to construct a pier on the River Humber and for other purposes.
- Citation: 2 & 3 Geo. 5. c. clxvi

Dates
- Royal assent: 13 December 1912

Text of statute as originally enacted

Another act, the North Killingholme Pier Act 1912 (2 & 3 Geo. 5. c. clxvi) sanctioned a commercial pier to be constructed by the Yorkshire Transport Company. The company's jetty was to be west of the Admiralty's jetty, 981 by 27 feet (299.0 by 8.2 m), with a westward "L" arm, 600 by 46 feet (183 by 14 m) long by wide, intended for shipment of coal from collieries accessible from the River Ouse. (unbuilt)

Adjacent to the Admiralty oil depot a seaplane station was opened in August 1914. Originally called RNAS Immingham it was renamed as RNAS Killingholme. By late 1914 Facilities at the site included a 177 by 56 feet (54 by 17 m) hangar and four 68 by 77 feet (21 by 23 m) seaplane hangars, as well as a 700 by 60 feet (213 by 18 m) slipway for the seaplanes. Facilities were increased during the First World War, including larger hangars and further slipways- with staff levels reaching 900 operating over 100 aeroplanes, one of the main seaplane bases in the UK. The facility was disbanded after the end of the war- some of the hangars were used to construct a bus depot in Grimsby (Victoria Street).

The riverside at and around North Killingholme Haven has been identified as a viable expansion point for further port facilities on the south bank of the Humber – an £80 million port was proposed in the 1980s but not proceeded with – a report by Coopers and Lybrand in the same period identified demand for both roll-on/roll-off (RoRo) and containerised handling facilities in the area. Later in the 1990s Ro-Ro facilities were established by Simon Group (see § Humber Sea Terminal).

The haven is currently (2015) used by dredging contractors Humber Work Boats Ltd..

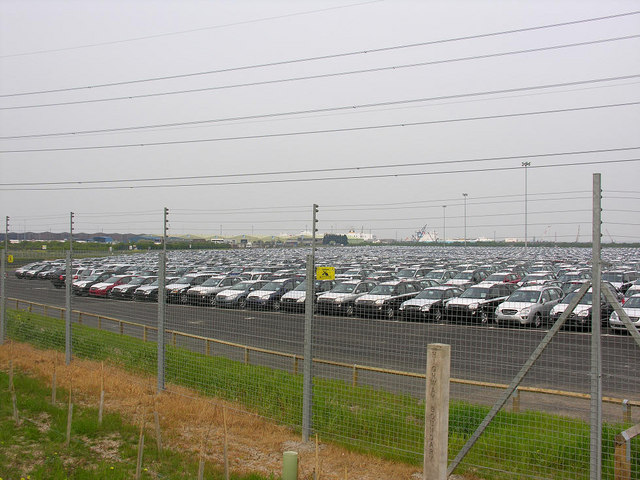
Killingholme car import storage (2008)

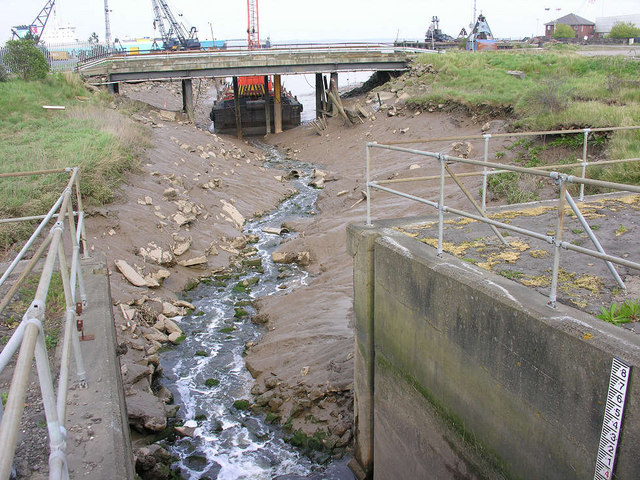
Exit of the main drain into the haven (2007)

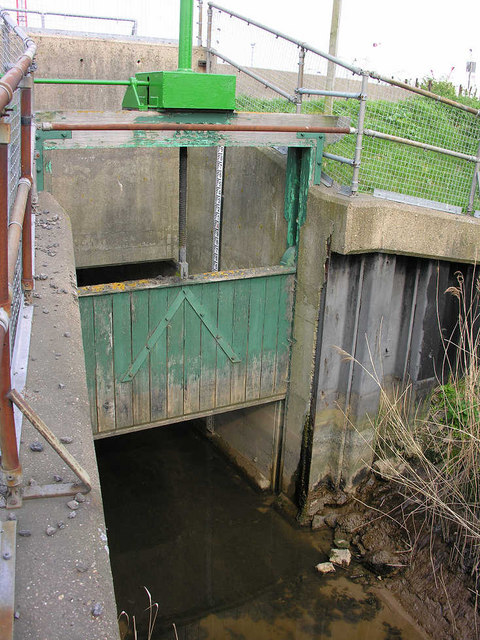
Sluice gate at outfall of drainage to the haven (2007)

=== Humber Sea Terminal (2000–present) ===
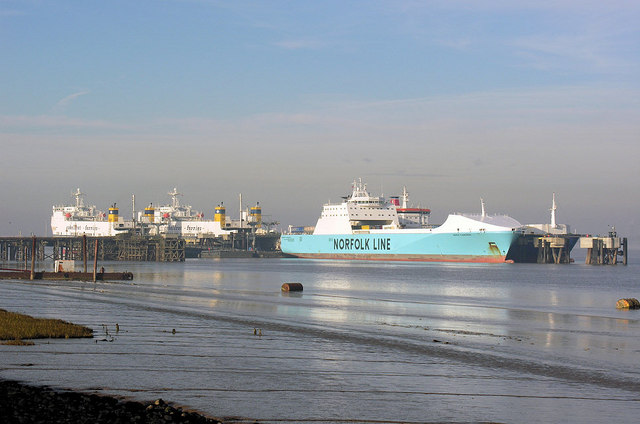
Humber Sea Terminal from the east (2007)

In the late 1994 Simon Group gained a statutory instrument enabling it to construct a jetty at Killingholme North Haven. The development was to be a deepwater roll-on/roll-off terminal aimed at container traffic from European ports such as Rotterdam. A tender in 1998 from Edmund Nuttall and consultants Posford Duvivier led to a contract in 1999. The works included a 143 metres (469 ft) two berth jetty supported on fifty 1,067 millimetres (42.0 in) tubular steel piles with a concrete deck; a cellular concrete pontoon 40 by 80 metres (130 by 260 ft) secured by two restraining dolphins consisting of outer and inner tubular steel piles of 1,700 and 1,067 millimetres (66.9 and 42.0 in) ring filled with concrete; and a 227 metres (745 ft) pier linking to land also on 1,067 millimetres (42.0 in) piles, connected to the pontoon by an 80 by 10 metres (262 by 33 ft) bridge. Shoreside construction was contracted to Clark Construction.

The two berth "Phase I" opened June 2000, with Stena Line sailing to Hook of Holland.

The facility's capacity of 14 sailings per week was soon reached, and in 2002 the developer, Simon Group began planning for a "Phase Two", with two further berths. The initial plan was for a third Ro-Ro berth from the original pontoon, plus a fourth berth for load-on/load-off (Lo-Lo) use, connection to the original land pier by a new spur. The "Phase Two" of the development was consented (2003); A £9.6 million contract for the third berth was awarded in 2003 to Edmund Nuttall, with the work including a new 240 metres (790 ft) jetty, as well as approach bridge and adjustable ramp.

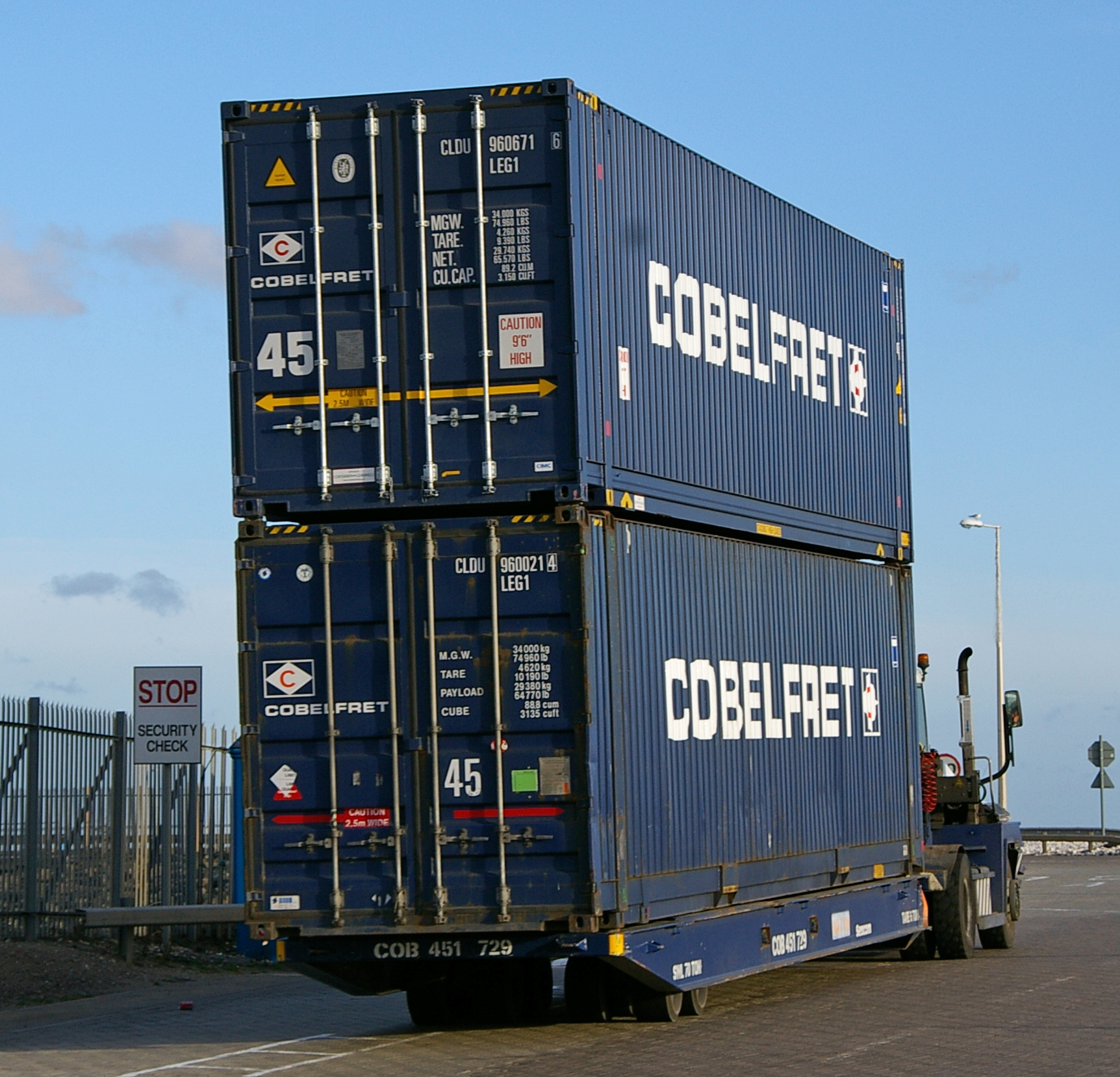
Container handling at the Humber Sea Terminal (2010)

The third berth was completed February 2004, consisting of a 240 by 13 metres (787 by 43 ft) concrete decked finger pier supported on tubular piles; the design gave a 17 metres (56 ft) water depth at high tide (8 metres (26 ft) tidal range), and allowed berthing of ships up to 35,000 gross tons and 200 metres (660 ft) long.

The fourth berth was re-designed to be either a Lo-Lo or Ro-Ro berth, and was constructed as a Ro-Ro facility with Belgian shipper Cobelfret signing a twenty-year agreement. Nuttall was selected as contractor for the £8 million fourth berth contract, including the approach bridge spur; 80 by 9.8 metres (262 by 32 ft) linkspan; and additional 40 by 35 metres (131 by 115 ft) cellular steel pontoon. The approach spur was begun in May 2003.

For phase 2 an additional £14.5 million was expended on onshore storage groundworks, covering 60 acres (24 ha).

Kia Motors relocated its import activities to a 55 acres (22 ha) vehicle import centre served by the port c. 2005, in association with ABLE UK and the port operators.

By late 2005 clients included Stena Line, Cobelfret, UECC, Norfolkline, Ferryways and Eukor. Planning for a third phase of the terminal, initially estimated as costing £25 million for two further berths was underway in 2005. A harbour revision order allowing a new jetty, pier and link bridge was enacted in 2006.

As of 2012 the terminal was owned by C.RO nv as subsidiary C.RO Ports Killingholme Ltd.. With effect from 25 April 2022, the C.RO identity was retired, and merged into the parent company CLdN. The port has six ro-ro berths, 250 acres (100 ha) of port land for development, and facilities that include a pre-delivery inspection (PDI) centre for cars, and a rail connection.
