= Barrow Haven =

Hamlet and small port in North Lincolnshire, England

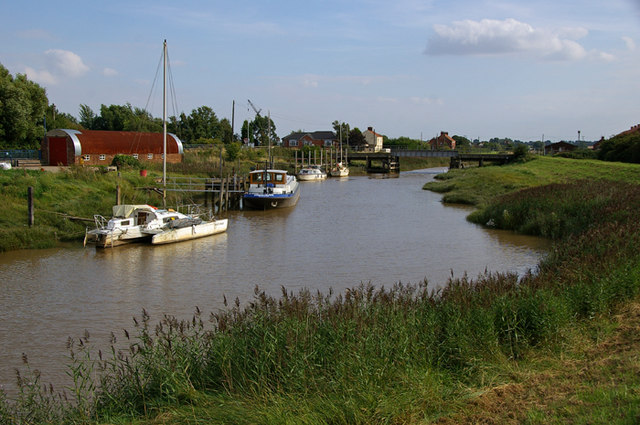
- Barrow Haven

- Location within Lincolnshire
- Population: 9,334
- OS grid reference: TA062229
  - London: 150 mi (240 km) S
- Unitary authority: North Lincolnshire
- Ceremonial county: Lincolnshire
- Region: Yorkshire and the Humber
- Country: England
- Sovereign state: United Kingdom
- Post town: BARROW-UPON-HUMBER
- Postcode district: DN19
- Dialling code: 01652
- Police: Humberside
- Fire: Humberside
- Ambulance: East Midlands
- UK Parliament: Brigg and Immingham

Barrow Haven is a hamlet and small port in North Lincolnshire, England. It was the site of a former ferry crossing that spanned from the Humber Estuary to Hull, serving as a place for ships and boats crossing the Humber to moor away from the tidal flow. A port continues to exist nearby and the area's rail access is based at the Barrow Haven railway station, a stop on the Barton Line.

== History ==
=== Medieval and early modern ===
On 5 October 1541 Henry VIII conducted a visit to Hull with the Privy Council, subsequently reaching Barrow Haven by water. The then King of England later travelled by horseback to Thornton Abbey.

Between the Barrow Beck (a local stream) and West Hann Lane, lie the remains of a large motte-and-bailey castle, known as Barrow Castle. Built in the Norman style, the two large structures stand with a low motte (a section of raised earthwork) situated between them. Extensive excavations were carried out in 1963 to determine the extent of the remains.

=== Ferry and railway ===
With the building of the railway line in 1848, the ferry service gradually disappeared as passengers preferred to embark from New Holland, but a market boat operated into the 1940s. The market boat depot was in a ramped building that is now the site where the imported timber is stored.

From its inception in 1848, the railway station consisted of a single open platform on the south side of the railway line to the east of Ferry Road. In the early twentieth century, a wooden ticket office and waiting room, with pot-belly stove, was constructed on the northern side of the railway line. This remained in place until the 1970s but with modernisation, the ticket office was removed to a Railway Museum, in Kirton Lindsey, on the Windmill site. Later it was taken to Burgh le Marsh, near Skegness. An open platform is again in use.

=== Brickworks ===
Barrow Haven was once renowned for its bricks and pantiles made from clay recovered from the edges of the Humber. Sanderson's and Pearson's brickyards were located on the west bank of the Haven and Foster's and Greenwood's on the east bank. The land formerly occupied by Sanderson's brickyard is now a caravan site and little evidence of the brickyard remains. These brickyards employed primitive, labour-intensive methods of manufacture. Clay was dug by hand during the summer months and stockpiled for use during the rest of the year. At Pearson's brickyard, the clay was hauled up a slope in metal skips and tipped into the clay mill. The clay mill rolled and squeezed the excess moisture from the clay and then extruded it into a rectangular shape approximately twenty four inches wide by twelve inches deep. This extrusion was cut into manageable segments with a wire and the segments stored in a cool building to wait collection by the labourers who operated the tile and brick-forming machines. These machines were hand-operated and required considerable strength to crank. The labourers were generally employed on 'piecework' and low-paid. The extruded bricks and pantiles were stored on the shelves of drying-sheds, each approximately fifty yards long. Wooden shutters on the side of the sheds could be adjusted to control the drying rate prior to the bricks and pantiles being taken to the kiln for firing. If the unbaked clay was allowed to dry too rapidly, the bricks and pantiles would develop cracks before firing. The Haven was an important landing point for barges bringing coal to fuel these brickyard kilns from the Yorkshire coalfields. Once firing began, the kiln was tended night and day as the coal had to be shovelled by hand to keep up the heat. The resulting products were generally high quality and extremely durable.

=== Haven Inn ===
An eighteenth-century coaching inn, Haven Inn is situated on Ferry Road near the intersection with Marsh Lane. Haven Inn was run by landlady Mrs. Naomi Mason from 1902 to 1943; a Mr. Fred Mason farmed the attached land and some other land in Barrow Haven; Mrs Mason, a farmer's wife as well as landlady, and undertook such duties as milking cows, and making butter and cream cheese for sale at Brigg Market. Poultry was also kept, and eggs were sent to market. A local bus, owned by Wesley Clark of Barrow upon Humber, took the farmers to Brigg on Market Day (Thursday). At Christmas time, poultry were dressed and sold at the market.

=== Local buildings ===
The hamlet has the remains of a windmill. There was a small Wesleyan chapel, now converted into a house; the datestone has been left in the brickwork.

There were once cottages for workmen along the banks of the Humber west of the railway bridge. Access was via a footpath that went through a gate at the north-western end of the railway bridge over the Haven or via West Marsh Lane and two wooden gates on either side of the railway line. These cottages were not provided with electricity, water or sanitation facilities. Kerosene lamps, hand pumps and earth toilets were standard. Floors were generally constructed of brick laid directly on the ground and the walls had no damp-proof courses. Cast iron fireplaces, consisting of a coal-fired open grate with a boiler box on one side and an oven on the other, were the sole means of heating and cooking. Disposal of household rubbish and night soil consisted of dumping into the Humber at any convenient tide. A shop stocked with produce through the market boat catered for the immediate needs of the local population, but more substantial purchases required travelling to Barton on Humber, or to New Holland and from there by ferry to Hull. An additional shop, run by a Mrs Dee, was on the Barrow Road; it was a lean-to attached to a house. A coal yard was next to the shop, on the Clew Bridge side of the building, which was first owned by Mr. Dee's, but in the 1930s it was owned by a Clifford Hastings. His coal was delivered by barge along the Haven. In later years he had a further coal yard just south of the station.

=== Water ===
The workers' cottages alongside the river suffered flooding whenever spring tides raised the level of the Humber. These buildings were largely abandoned by the 1960s and were demolished as tidal fortifications and river bank conservation took place along the south bank of the river. During this same period, the banks of the haven were raised on both sides, from the mouth of the Haven to as far as the old sluice gates. This minimised the Haven bursting its banks during spring tides and flooding the houses in the hamlet proper.

The sluice gates, locally known as Clew Gates, marked the point where the spring-fed stream from Barrow upon Humber known as the Beck, became the Haven. Approximately 50 metres south of the railway line, a small watercourse, also known locally as 'the clew', drained land from east of Ferry Road into the Haven, passing under Ferry Road through a large pipe. Despite the presence of many salt water-flooded claypits, fresh water springs are common in the area. When the tide is suitable, dabs, flounders and eels can be caught in the haven and the flooded claypits contain roach, perch, tench, bream and eels.

A boatyard and dry dock were situated on the east bank of the Haven, immediately north of the railway line. A re-furbished nissen hut and slipway are all that remains of what was once a boat building and repair industry for the Humber's two types of sailing barge, the sloop and the keel. Motor-powered barges, including a Dutch barge and a Humber sloop, still moor in the haven and rest on the mud on their flat bottoms when the tide recedes.

=== Watercress ===
Until the 1970s there was a commercial watercress industry, run by the now-defunct Greatford Gardens Watercress Company, using water pumped from artesian bores reaching deep within the limestone strata of the Lincolnshire Wolds. In some years, the bores became naturally flowing artesian wells when pressure was sufficient to allow the water to reach the surface without the aid of pumps. Spring water with a slight alkalinity, such as that imparted by the limestone strata, is especially suitable for watercress. Some remnants of this industry can be found to the west of the old sluice gates, approximately eight hundred yards south of the Haven Inn. Other watercress beds owned by the company were located to the east of Ferry Road but have now been ploughed over and little evidence remains of their existence. At the eastern location, there were approximately twenty five watercress beds each ten yards wide by one hundred yards long. The beds were built with a slight gradient and water was directed through a channel into the highest end and then allowed flow gently down the length of the bed before leaving through a narrow opening at the lower end. The water then flowed into a channel which directed it into the Beck approximately fifty yards to the east of the Clew Gates. The watercress was gathered by hand and put onto wooden trays before being taken to a packing shed where it was divided into bundles, labelled and then the roots cut off. The bunches were then packed into wooden baskets, known as chips and transported by road to the rail and ferry centre at New Holland for delivery to customers. The severed roots were returned to the watercress bed where they were replanted. The company had similar watercress farms at Healing, Lincolnshire, Stamford, Lincolnshire and Fordingbridge, Hampshire. The company ceased its operations in Barrow Haven when it lost its water rights.

=== Second World War ===
Barrow Haven was also the site for an anti-aircraft battery, (Note: 53°41′39″N 0°24′07″W Anti Aircraft battery) which provided protection for the city of Hull. Remains of an observation post are located on the edge of the Humber close to what was once Greenwood's brickyard. (Note: 53°42′07″N 0°23′15″W Observation post)

== Barrow Haven port ==
The small port of Barrow Haven, 1.5 miles (2.4 km) north, on the railway line from Cleethorpes and Grimsby to Barton-upon-Humber handles timber from Latvia and Estonia.
