= Killingholme B power station =

Natural gas power station in England

Killingholme B Power Station
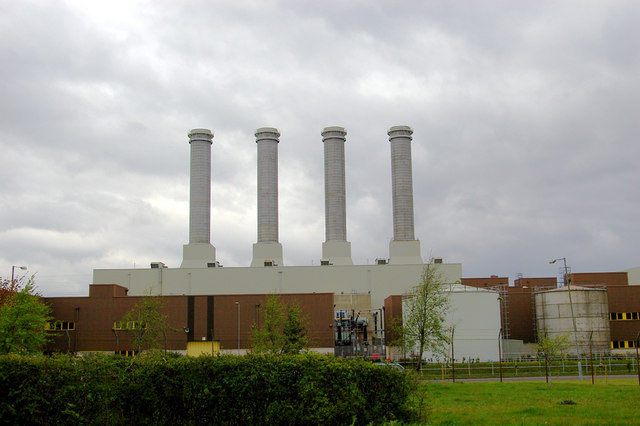
- Killingholme B Power Station (2006)
- Country: England
- Location: Lincolnshire, East Midlands
- Coordinates: 53.65419°N 0.25518°W
- Status: Operational
- Commission date: 1993
- Operators: Powergen (1993–2002); E.ON UK (2002–2015); Uniper (2015–present)

Thermal power station
- Primary fuel: Natural gas
- Combined cycle?: Yes

Power generation
- Nameplate capacity: 900 MW

External links
- Commons: Related media on Commons

Killingholme B Power Station is a Combined‐cycle gas turbine natural gas power station in the civil parish of North Killingholme in North Lincolnshire, north of the Lindsey Oil Refinery, and adjacent to Killingholme A power station

Killingholme B (900 MW) opened in 1993 and is owned by Uniper (Formerly E.ON UK).

== Specification ==
The Uniper (Formerly E.ON UK) plant consists of two 450 MW Siemens V94.2 gas turbine modules each connected to a heat recovery steam generator using only a single steam turbine in a 2 into 1 configuration. Gas is supplied from a 26-mile pipeline from Theddlethorpe.

When it was built by Powergen (now called Uniper) and opened in April 1993 it was only the second gas-fired power station built in the UK. It was taken out of service in 2002 due to the lower price of electricity and was then restored to full service in August 2005, with one of the 450 MW units returning to service in April 2005. E.ON UK have an Education Centre at their site for school children.

In June 2015 E.ON UK announced the plant is to be closed.

Sometimes referred to as Killingholme B powerstation.

== See also ==
- Industry of the South Humber Bank
