= Nirex =

Former waste management organisation in the UK, now NDA/RWM

Nirex was a United Kingdom body set up in 1982 by the UK nuclear industry to examine safe, environmental and economic aspects of deep geological disposal of intermediate-level and low-level radioactive waste (LLRW).

== History ==
Originally known as the Nuclear Industry Radioactive Waste Executive, it became United Kingdom Nirex Limited in 1985. The ownership of Nirex was transferred from the nuclear industry to the UK Government departments DEFRA and DTI in April 2005, and then to the UK's Nuclear Decommissioning Authority (NDA) in November 2006. Nirex's staff and functions were integrated into the NDA in April 2007, at which point Nirex ceased trading as a separate entity. Nirex's role continued through the activities of the Radioactive Waste Management Directorate of the NDA, which later became Radioactive Waste Management Ltd (now trading as Nuclear Waste Services).

Nirex had gained widespread notoriety during the 1980s as the focus for widespread public opposition to the burying of nuclear waste in the UK. Nirex was based at Harwell, Oxfordshire and had several roles:

- to advise organisations and companies that produce radioactive waste on how they should package radioactive waste;
- to set standards for radioactive waste packaging. It monitored the processes of organisations and companies to check, for example, that they had procedures for keeping adequate records;
- to produce on behalf of the UK Department for the Environment, Food and Rural Affairs an updated public record of the quantities and types of radioactive waste in the UK;
- to continue to develop understanding of the scientific, technological and environmental options for dealing with radioactive waste, including developing an understanding of the requirements for public acceptability.

Nirex was also involved in keeping the UK abreast of international expertise in research and development into the disposal of radioactive waste.

During the mid-1980s proposals for low-level nuclear waste repositories at Billingham, Elstow, Bradwell, Fulbeck, and South Killingholme were abandoned due to local opposition. In 1989, work began on two possible sites to take both intermediate and low-level waste near Dounreay in Caithness and near Sellafield in Cumbria. Following preliminary investigations at both sites, Nirex announced plans in October 1992 to build a “Rock Characterisation Facility” (RCF) at Sellafield. Nirex critics including Cumbria County Council, Friends of the Earth and Greenpeace argued that the RCF was an integral part of Nirex's repository plans and in effect a 'trojan horse' for an intended nuclear waste repository. It was also successfully argued that the RCF proposal was scientifically flawed and that Nirex's scientific knowledge was insufficient to prove that disposal was safe for any site. In 1997, following a five-month local planning inquiry, the Secretary of State for the Environment rejected Nirex's case.

The Inquiry Inspector said "chemical containment is new and untried, with more experimentation and modelling development indubitably required. This work would to my mind be particularly difficult and important because of the problems of meaningfully testing some of the components of the concept. Implicitly Nirex feels unable to credit the notion that this barrier would fail; but the lack of any calculation based on an adverse, as distinct from a conservative, interpretation of this chemical containment seems to me to be an unfortunate omission from the emerging safety case, particularly having regard to FOE's impressive critique of the concept.".
