= North East Lincolnshire Council elections =

Local government elections in Lincolnshire, England

North East Lincolnshire Council is the local authority for the unitary authority of North East Lincolnshire in Lincolnshire, England.

== Council elections ==
- 1995 North East Lincolnshire Council election
- 1999 North East Lincolnshire Council election
- 2003 North East Lincolnshire Council election (New ward boundaries)
- 2004 North East Lincolnshire Council election
- 2006 North East Lincolnshire Council election
- 2007 North East Lincolnshire Council election
- 2008 North East Lincolnshire Council election
- 2010 North East Lincolnshire Council election
- 2011 North East Lincolnshire Council election
- 2012 North East Lincolnshire Council election
- 2014 North East Lincolnshire Council election
- 2015 North East Lincolnshire Council election
- 2016 North East Lincolnshire Council election
- 2018 North East Lincolnshire Council election
- 2019 North East Lincolnshire Council election
- 2021 North East Lincolnshire Council election
- 2022 North East Lincolnshire Council election
- 2023 North East Lincolnshire Council election
- 2024 North East Lincolnshire Council election
- 2026 North East Lincolnshire Council election

== District result maps ==
2003 results map

2004 results map

2006 results map

2007 results map

2008 results map

2010 results map

2011 results map

2012 results map

2014 results map

2015 results map

2016 results map

2018 results map

2019 results map

2021 results map

2022 results map

2023 results map

2024 results map

2026 results map

== By-election results ==
=== 2026–2030 ===
Croft Baker By-Election 12 November 2026
Party	Candidate	Votes	%	±%
Reform	Melissa Grice	797	41.9	−9.5
Labour	Janet Mager	690	36.3	+16.4
Restore	Matthew Branson	150	7.9	+7.9
Conservative	Stephen Harness	139	7.3	−0.9
Green	Leon Brown	91	4.8	−9.0
Independent	George Georgiou	35	1.8	−1.1
Majority		107	5.6	
Turnout		1,902		
Reform gain from Labour		Swing		

=== 2018–2022 ===
Park By-Election 17 February 2022
Party	Candidate	Votes	%	±%
Conservative	Marian Boyd	715	38.8	
Labour	Kevin Shutt	578	31.4	
Liberal Democrats	Ryan Aisthorpe	478	26.0	
TUSC	Dave Mitchell	70	3.8	
Majority		137	7.4	
Turnout		1,841		
Conservative hold		Swing		

Heneage By-Election 1 July 2021
Party	Candidate	Votes	%	±%
Conservative	Catherine Hogan	507	41.9	
Labour	Emma Clough	344	28.4	
Liberal Democrats	Les Bonner	336	27.7	
TUSC	Patrick O'Neill	24	2.0	
Majority		163	13.5	
Turnout		1,211		
Conservative gain from Labour		Swing		

Freshney Ward By-election 26 July 2018
Party	Candidate	Votes	%
Labour	Sheldon James Mill	692	41.3
Conservative	Steve Holland	650	38.8
Independent	Mick Kiff	231	13.8
UKIP	Barry Charles Fisher	78	4.7
Green	Loyd Layton Emmerson	24	1.4
Majority		42	
Labour hold		Swing	

=== 2014–2018 ===
South By-election 9 June 2016
Party	Candidate	Votes	%
Labour	Janet Angela Goodwin	758	50.6
UKIP	Stephen Whittingham	462	30.8
Conservative	Paul David Batson	212	14.2
Green	Lloyd Layton Emmerson	40	2.7
TUSC	Val O'Flynn	26	1.7
Majority		296	
Labour hold		Swing	

Croft Baker ward By-election 23 July 2015
Party	Candidate	Votes	%
Labour	Annie Darby	768	37.0
Conservative	Hayden Dawkins	513	24.7
Liberal Democrats	Roy Horobin	323	15.6
UKIP	Graham John Critchley	318	15.3
TUSC	Dave Mitchell	85	4.1
Green	James William Barker	66	3.1
Majority		255	
Labour hold		Swing	

=== 2010–2014 ===
Humberston and New Waltham By-election 4 April 2013
Party	Candidate	Votes	%
UKIP	Stephen William Harness	1,098	42.0
Conservative	Harry Hall	738	28.2
Labour	Ashley David Smith	470	18.0
Liberal Democrats	Stephen John Stead	311	11.9
Majority		360	
UKIP gain from Conservative		Swing	

=== Earlier ===
- Yarborough – 26 March 2009 – Lib Dem hold
- East Marsh – 26 August 2004 – Lib Dem hold
- Humberston – 11 April 2002 – Con hold
- Marsh – 7 June 2001 – Lab gain from Ind
- Yarborough – 21 October 1999 – Lib Dem hold
