= 2024 North East Lincolnshire Council election =

Local election in North East Lincolnshire, England

- 2 May 2024

12 out of 42 seats to North East Lincolnshire Council 22 seats needed for a majority

	Majority party	Minority party
Leader	Philip Jackson	Kathryn Wheatley
Party	Conservative	Labour
Leader's seat	Waltham	West Marsh
Seats before	27	9
Seats after	19	15
Seat change	▼8	▲6
	Third party	Fourth party
Leader	Nicola Aisthorpe	Steve Holland
Party	Liberal Democrats	Independent
Leader's seat	East Marsh	Freshney
Seats before	3	3
Seats after	3	5
Seat change	Steady	▲2
- The winner of each seat in the 2024 North East Lincolnshire Council Election
Leader before election
Philip Jackson
Conservative
Leader after election
Philip Jackson
Conservative
No overall control

The 2024 North East Lincolnshire Council election was held on Thursday 2 May 2024, alongside the other local elections in the United Kingdom on the same day. 12 of the 42 members of North East Lincolnshire Council in Lincolnshire were elected.

The Conservative Party lost control of the council to no overall control. They remained the largest party, and continued to run the council as a minority administration.

== Background ==
North East Lincolnshire was created as a unitary authority in 1996. The Labour Party held a majority on the council until 2003, when the council fell to no overall control. Labour retook the council in 2012, but lost the council in 2016. The Conservatives won their first majority on the council in 2019, and have controlled the council since then. In the previous election, the Conservatives won 7 seats (down 3) with 41.5% of the vote, Labour won 5 (up 1) with 38.1%, independents won 2 (up 2) with 9.6%, and the Liberal Democrats defended their seat up for election with 7.0%.

The seats up for election in 2024 were last contested in 2021; because of the delay of all local elections due to the COVID-19 pandemic, the seats are up for election after 3 years rather than the usual 4. In that election, the Conservatives gained 8 seats with 60.3% of the vote, Labour lost 7 with 25.6%, and the Liberal Democrats lost 1 with 5.5%.

== Previous council composition ==
After 2023 election		Before 2024 election		After 2024 election	
Party	Seats	Party	Seats	Party	Seats
Conservative	27	Conservative	27	Conservative	19
Labour	9	Labour	9	Labour	15
Liberal Democrats	3	Liberal Democrats	3	Liberal Democrats	3
Independent	3	Independent	3	Independent	5

== Result summary ==
2024 North East Lincolnshire Council election
Party	This election			Full council			This election		
Party	Seats	Net	Seats %	Other	Total	Total %	Votes	Votes %	+/−
Conservative	3	▼8	25.0	16	19	45.2	7,854	35.9	-24.4
Labour	6	▲6	50.0	9	15	35.7	8,809	40.3	+14.7
Independent	2	▲2	16.7	3	5	11.9	2,021	9.2	+5.4
Liberal Democrats	1	Steady	8.3	2	3	7.1	2,559	11.7	+6.2
TUSC	0	Steady	0.0	0	0	0.0	620	2.8	+0.8

== Ward results ==
Incumbents are marked with an asterisk (*).

=== Croft Baker ===
Croft Baker
Party	Candidate	Votes	%	±%
Labour	Marian Jervis	1,122	58.9	▲19.3
Conservative	Graham Reynolds*	586	30.7	▼19.3
Liberal Democrats	Gemma Harney	198	10.4	▼7.0
Majority		536	28.1	
Turnout			23.2	−4.7
Labour gain from Conservative		Swing	▲19.3	

=== East Marsh ===
East Marsh
Party	Candidate	Votes	%	±%
Liberal Democrats	Loyd Emmerson	557	57.8	▼3.1
Labour Co-op	Barry Miller	322	33.4	▼14.0
Conservative	Callum Procter	85	8.8	▼6.3
Majority		235	24.4	
Turnout			13.7	−5.6
Liberal Democrats hold		Swing	▼10.1	

=== Freshney ===
Freshey
Party	Candidate	Votes	%	±%
Independent	Paul Bright	997	54.7	New
Labour	Samantha Holborow	433	23.7	▼15.3
Conservative	Tanya Brasted*	328	18.0	▼38.9
Liberal Democrats	Tamzin Barton	38	2.0	New
TUSC	Paul Wood	28	1.5	▼0.3
Majority		564	30.9	
Turnout			25.7	−1.4
Independent gain from Conservative		Swing	▲46.8	

=== Haverstoe ===
Haverstoe
Party	Candidate	Votes	%	±%
Conservative	Bill Parkinson*	1,331	59.1	▼12.8
Labour	Ian Townsend	691	30.6	▲12.8
Liberal Democrats	Stephen Hocknell	172	7.6	▼0.8
TUSC	Val O'Flynn	58	2.6	▲0.7
Majority		640	28.5	−25.6
Turnout			28.9	−8.1
Conservative hold		Swing	▼12.8	

=== Heneage ===
Heneage
Party	Candidate	Votes	%	±%
Labour	Emma Clough	734	48.1	▼18.0
Conservative	Tyrone Curran	366	24.0	▼28.3
Liberal Democrats	Brian Barrett	345	22.6	▲18.7
TUSC	John Stiff	81	5.3	▲1.9
Majority		368	24.1	
Turnout			19.0	−4.4
Labour gain from Conservative		Swing	▲17.9	

=== Humberston and New Waltham ===
Humberston and New Waltham
Party	Candidate	Votes	%	±%
Conservative	Hayden Dawkins*	1,290	56.0	▼20.6
Labour	Pauline Kaczmarek	698	30.3	▲11.4
Liberal Democrats	Ryan Aisthorpe	245	10.6	New
TUSC	Joe Carter	72	3.1	▲1.8
Majority		592	25.7	−32.0
Turnout			23.0	−8.3
Conservative hold		Swing	▼16.0	

=== Immingham ===
Immingham
Party	Candidate	Votes	%	±%
Conservative	Trevor Crofts	754	42.0	▼6.1
Labour	David Watson	744	41.5	▲11.2
Liberal Democrats	David Barton	219	12.2	New
TUSC	Nathan Newton	77	4.3	▲3.1
Majority		10	0.6	−26.6
Turnout			20.3	−3.1
Conservative hold		Swing	▼8.7	

=== Park ===
Park
Party	Candidate	Votes	%	±%
Labour	Robson Augusta	1,079	44.4	▲19.7
Conservative	Daniel Westcott*	947	38.1	▼14.7
Liberal Democrats	Zach Kellerman	381	15.3	▼1.0
TUSC	Dave Mitchell	77	3.1	▲0.6
Majority		132	6.3	
Turnout			28.8	−2.6
Labour gain from Conservative		Swing	▲17.2	

=== Scartho ===
Scartho
Party	Candidate	Votes	%	±%
Labour	Dan Humphrey	1,117	46.5	▲20.4
Conservative	Charlotte Croft*	1,071	44.6	▼16.8
Liberal Democrats	Caroline Ellis	157	6.5	New
TUSC	Val Pow	57	2.4	▼1.3
Majority		46	1.91	
Turnout			27.0	−5.2
Labour gain from Conservative		Swing	▲18.6	

=== Sidney Sussex ===
Sidney Sussex
Party	Candidate	Votes	%	±%
Labour	Edward Kaczmarek	672	50.7	▲12.6
Conservative	Alexandra Curran	411	31.0	▼17.7
Liberal Democrats	Andy Burton	126	9.5	▲4.9
TUSC	Mark Gee	117	8.8	▲5.9
Majority		261	19.7	
Turnout			16.7	−3.5
Labour gain from Conservative		Swing	▲15.2	

=== South ===
South
Party	Candidate	Votes	%	±%
Labour	Sheldon Mill	726	55.0	▲17.3
Conservative	Paul Batson*	345	26.2	▼18.3
Independent	Jane Bramley	144	10.9	New
Liberal Democrats	Andrew Harrison	74	5.6	New
TUSC	Bill Ward	30	2.3	▲1.4
Majority		381	28.9	
Turnout			15.6	−1.1
Labour gain from Conservative		Swing	▲17.8	

=== Yarborough ===
Yarborough
Party	Candidate	Votes	%	±%
Independent	Les Bonner	880	50.0	New
Labour Co-op	Sam Brown	471	26.7	▼2.6
Conservative	Christine Vickers	340	19.3	▼38.4
Liberal Democrats	Aharon Wharton	47	2.7	▼4.9
TUSC	Andrew Harrison	23	1.3	▼3.0
Majority		409	23.2	
Turnout			21.0	−1.8
Independent gain from Conservative		Swing	▲44.2	
