= 2010 North East Lincolnshire Council election =

2010 English local government election

Map of the 2010 North East Lincolnshire Council election

The 2008 North East Lincolnshire Council election took place on 6 May 2010 to elect a third of the members of North East Lincolnshire Council, the council of North East Lincolnshire in England. This was on the same day as the other local elections as well as the 2010 United Kingdom general election. The previous council election took place in 2008 and the following election was held in 2011. In the election, the council stayed under no overall control.

== Results ==
Party	Previous	Seats +/-	2010
Liberal Democrat	19	▼4	15
Conservative	16	▼1	15
Labour	4	▲6	10
Others	3	▼1	2

== See also ==
- North East Lincolnshire Council elections
