= 2022 North East Lincolnshire Council election =

Local election to North Lincolnshire Council

← 2021	5 May 2022	2023 →

16 out of 42 seats to North East Lincolnshire Council 22 seats needed for a majority

	First party	Second party
Leader	Philip Jackson	Matthew Patrick
Party	Conservative	Labour
Leader's seat	Waltham	Heneage
Last election	31 seats, 60.3%	8 seats, 25.6%
Seats won	9	4
Seats after	30	8
Seat change	▼1	Steady
Popular vote	14,070	10,344
Percentage	47.3%	34.8%
Swing	▼13.0%	▲9.2%
	Third party	Fourth party
Leader	Steve Beasant
Party	Liberal Democrats	Independent
Leader's seat	East Marsh
Last election	3 seats, 5.5%	0 seats, 3.8%
Seats won	2	1
Seats after	3	1
Seat change	Steady	▲1
Popular vote	3,167	1,445
Percentage	10.6%	4.9%
Swing	▲5.1%	▲1.1%
- Winner of each seat at the 2022 North East Lincolnshire Council election
Council control before election
Conservative
Council control after election
Conservative

The 2022 North East Lincolnshire Council election took place on 5 May 2022 to elect members of North East Lincolnshire Council in England. This was on the same day as other local elections.

== Results summary ==
2022 North East Lincolnshire Council election
Party	This election			Full council			This election		
Party	Seats	Net	Seats %	Other	Total	Total %	Votes	Votes %	+/−
Conservative	9	▼1	56.3	21	30	71.4	14,070	47.3	-13.0
Labour	4	Steady	25.0	4	8	19.0	10,344	34.8	+9.2
Liberal Democrats	2	Steady	12.5	1	3	7.1	3,167	10.6	+5.1
Independent	1	▲1	6.3	0	1	2.4	1,445	4.9	+1.1
TUSC	0	Steady	0.0	0	0	0.0	389	1.3	-0.7
Green	0	Steady	0.0	0	0	0.0	234	0.8	N/A
ADF	0	Steady	0.0	0	0	0.0	102	0.3	N/A

== Ward results ==
=== Croft Baker ===
Croft Baker
Party	Candidate	Votes	%	±%
Conservative	Oliver Freeston	1,205	51.7	+5.3
Labour	Janet Haggis	867	37.2	+6.2
Green	Andrew Dickson	112	4.8	N/A
Independent	George Georgiou	102	4.4	N/A
TUSC	Julian Best	47	2.0	+0.5
Majority		338	14.5	
Turnout		2,333	27.9	
Conservative hold		Swing	▼0.5	

=== East Marsh ===
East Marsh
Party	Candidate	Votes	%	±%
Liberal Democrats	Steve Beasant	868	89.0	+28.1
Liberal Democrats	Lynsey McLean	635	65.1	+13.2
Labour	Khawar Khawaja	237	24.3	+8.0
Conservative	Andrea Hardware	138	14.2	−0.9
TUSC	Lee Coulbeck	71	7.3	−5.0
Turnout			17.0	
Liberal Democrats hold		Swing		
Liberal Democrats hold		Swing		

=== Freshney ===
Freshney
Party	Candidate	Votes	%	±%
Independent	Steve Holland	750	35.5	N/A
Conservative	Callum Procter	701	33.2	−23.8
Labour	Sheldon Mill	660	31.3	−7.8
Majority		49	2.3	
Turnout		2,111	29.7	
Independent gain from Conservative		Swing	N/A	

=== Haverstoe ===
Haverstoe
Party	Candidate	Votes	%	±%
Conservative	Margaret Cracknell	1,751	68.0	−3.9
Labour	Ian Rodwell	824	32.0	+14.2
Majority		927	36.0	
Turnout		2,575	32.9	
Conservative hold		Swing	▼9.1	

=== Heneage ===
Heneage
Party	Candidate	Votes	%	±%
Labour	Kevin Shutt	745	40.6	+1.1
Liberal Democrats	Leslie Bonner	556	30.3	+26.4
Conservative	Mark Sandford	502	27.4	−22.7
TUSC	Daryl Clifford	30	1.6	−1.8
Majority		189	10.3	
Turnout		1,833	23.4	
Labour hold		Swing	▼12.7	

=== Humberston and New Waltham ===
Humberston and New Waltham
Party	Candidate	Votes	%	±%
Conservative	Stephen Harness	1,819	70.5	−6.0
Labour	Ian Townsend	761	29.5	+10.6
Majority		1,058	41.0	
Turnout		2,580	27.0	
Conservative hold		Swing	▼8.3	

=== Immingham ===
Immingham
Party	Candidate	Votes	%	±%
Conservative	Stewart Swinburn	1,144	55.3	+7.2
Labour	David Watson	700	33.8	+3.5
Independent	David Barton	188	9.1	+0.2
TUSC	Nathan Newton	38	1.8	+0.6
Majority		444	21.5	
Turnout		2,070	23.5	
Conservative hold		Swing	▲1.9	

=== Park ===
Park
Party	Candidate	Votes	%	±%
Conservative	Paul Silvester	968	40.5	−12.3
Liberal Democrats	Ryan Aisthope	695	29.1	+12.6
Labour Co-op	Quibs Brown	665	27.8	+3.1
TUSC	Dave Mitchell	63	2.6	+0.1
Majority		273	11.4	
Turnout		2,391	27.7	
Conservative hold		Swing	▼12.5	

=== Scartho ===
Scartho
Party	Candidate	Votes	%	±%
Conservative	Ronald Shepherd	1,541	56.3	−2.5
Labour	Robson Augusta	1,194	43.7	+18.7
Majority		347	12.6	
Turnout		2,956	31.2	
Conservative hold		Swing	▼10.6	

=== South ===
South
Party	Candidate	Votes	%	±%
Labour	Tim Mickleburgh	727	52.3	+14.5
Conservative	Karen Batson	533	38.4	−6.1
ADF	Phillip Moulson	102	7.3	N/A
TUSC	Bill Ward	27	1.9	+1.0
Majority		194	13.9	
Turnout		1,389	16.1	
Labour hold		Swing	▲10.3	

=== Sidney Sussex ===
Sidney Sussex
Party	Candidate	Votes	%	±%
Labour	Sophia Farren	819	48.8	+10.7
Conservative	Christine Vickers	747	44.5	−4.2
TUSC	Mark Gee	113	6.7	+3.8
Majority		72	4.3	
Turnout		1,679	21.3	
Labour hold		Swing	▲7.5	

=== Waltham ===
Waltham
Party	Candidate	Votes	%	±%
Conservative	Nicholas Pettigrew	1,232	69.1	−16.6
Labour	Peter Bailey	551	30.9	+16.6
Majority		681	38.2	
Turnout		1,783	32.4	
Conservative hold		Swing	▼16.6	

=== West Marsh ===
West March
Party	Candidate	Votes	%	±%
Labour	Kathryn Wheatley	452	52.7	+13.7
Independent	Peter Barker	405	47.3	+18.1
Majority		47	5.4	
Turnout		857	16.7	
Labour hold		Swing	▼2.2	

=== Wolds ===
Wolds
Party	Candidate	Votes	%	±%
Conservative	David Hasthorpe	891	51.0	−25.9
Liberal Democrats	Loyd Emmerson	413	23.6	N/A
Labour	Wil Chapman	321	18.4	−4.7
Green	Lorna Kirman	122	7.0	N/A
Majority		478	27.4	
Turnout		1,747	28.8	
Conservative hold		Swing	N/A	

=== Yarborough ===
Yarborough
Party	Candidate	Votes	%	±%
Conservative	James Cairns	898	52.2	+6.8
Labour	Edward Kaczmarek	821	47.8	+15.2
Majority		77	4.4	
Turnout		1,719	20.2	
Conservative hold		Swing	▼4.2	
