= 2008 North East Lincolnshire Council election =

2008 English local government election

Map of the 2008 North East Lincolnshire Council election

The 2008 North East Lincolnshire Council election took place on 1 May 2008 to elect a third of the members of North East Lincolnshire Council, the council of North East Lincolnshire in England. This was on the same day as the other 2008 United Kingdom local elections. The previous council election took place in 2007 and the following election was held in 2010. In the election, the council stayed under no overall control.

== Results ==
Party	Previous	Seats +/-	2008
Liberal Democrat	19	▲1	20
Conservative	15	▲1	16
Labour	6	▼2	4
Others	2	Steady	2

== See also ==
- North East Lincolnshire Council elections
