= Grimsby Town Hall =

Municipal building in Grimsby, Lincolnshire, England

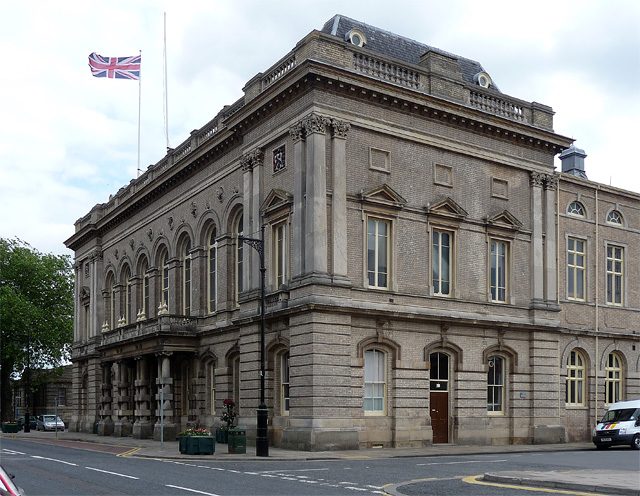
- Grimsby Town Hall

- Shown in Lincolnshire
- 53.5648°N 0.0822°W
- Location: Grimsby

History
- Built: 1863

Site notes
- Architect(s): Bellamy and Hardy and John Giles
- Architectural style: Italianate style

Listed Building – Grade II
- Official name: Town Hall
- Designated: 31 October 1974
- Reference no.: 1379888

Grimsby Town Hall is a municipal building in Town Hall Square in Grimsby, Lincolnshire, England. The building, which is the meeting place of North East Lincolnshire Council, is a Grade II listed building.

== History ==
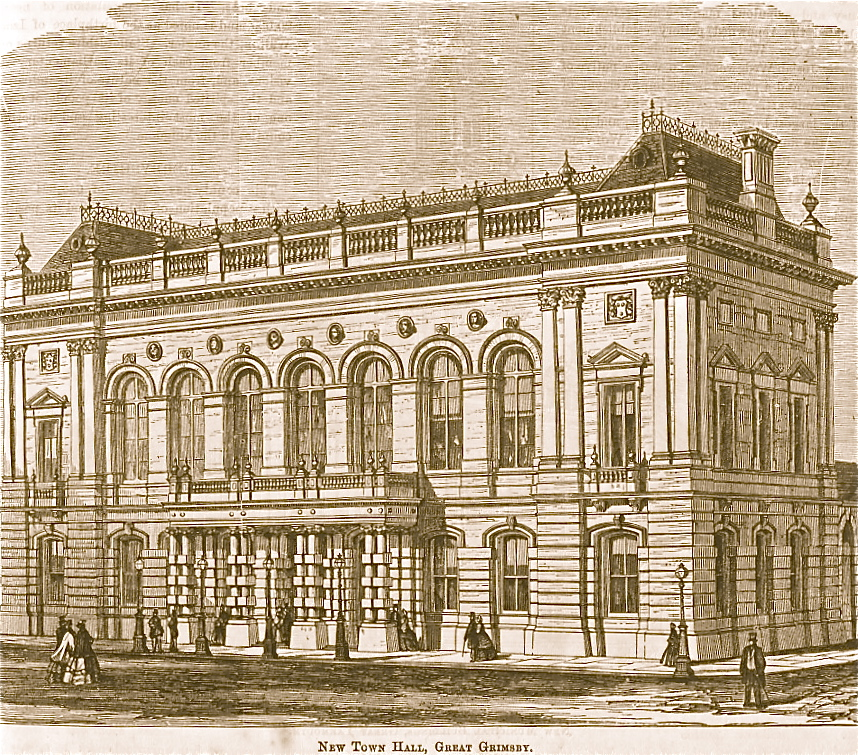
Sketch of the town hall dated 1894

The first town hall in Grimsby, which was located near Grimsby Minster, was completed in the 13th century; this was replaced by the second town hall, which was built in a similar area, in 1391 and by the third, also in a similar area, in 1780. After the third town hall became inadequate, civic leaders decided to procure a fourth town hall; the site they selected had previously been an area of open land known as Six Acres Field.

The new building was designed by Bellamy and Hardy and John Giles in the Italianate style and the design work was superintended by James Fowler; it was built by the local building firm of John Brown and completed in 1863. The design involved a symmetrical main frontage with nine bays facing onto Town Hall Square with the end bays slightly projected forward and decorated with Corinthian order pilasters; the central section of seven bays featured a single-storey tetrastyle portico with paired Ionic order columns supporting an entablature and a balustraded balcony; there was a round headed French door flanked by round headed windows on the first floor. Above the first floor windows were six roundels depicting key people in the town's history: King Edward III (who granted land to the town's freemen), Archbishop John Whitgift (who was born in the town), Gervase Holles, (who served as a local member of parliament during the English Civil War), Charles Pelham, 4th Earl of Yarborough (who served as High Steward of Great Grimsby), Queen Victoria and Prince Albert. Internally, the principal room was a large assembly hall.

The local girls' school, which was completed in 1863 and later became the Doughty Learning Centre, and the corporation grammar school, which was completed in 1867 and later became the registrar's office, formed single-storey flanking pavilions to the town hall. The town hall was extended to the rear to a design by E. W. Farebrother and John Buchan to create a courthouse, a council chamber, a banqueting room, a police station and some police cells in 1887.

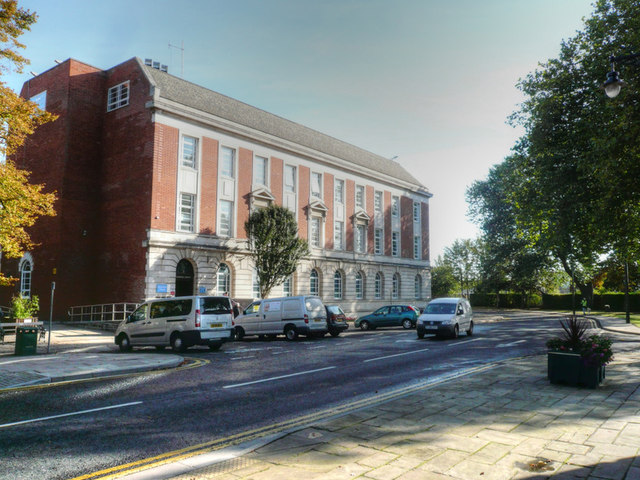
Municipal Buildings, opposite the town hall

As the council's responsibilities grew it needed more office space than was available in the town hall. A new building called Municipal Buildings was built opposite the town hall, being completed in 1941.

Stained glass windows, designed by G. King and Son, were installed in the council chamber in the town hall in 1955 and the police moved out of the building to a new police station in Victoria Street in September 1957. The police cells, located in the basement, were subsequently converted to create a series of local history exhibits entitled the "Time Trap Museum".

Queen Elizabeth II, accompanied by the Duke of Edinburgh, visited the town hall and met with civic leaders on 12 July 1977.

The town hall continued to serve as the meeting place of Great Grimsby County Borough Council for much of the 20th century and remained the local seat of government when Great Grimsby District Council was formed, with the same boundaries, in 1974. The town hall also continued to act as a judicial facility until the Combined Court Centre opened on a site opposite the town hall in 1988. Following the abolition of Humberside County Council in 1996, the town hall and municipal buildings opposite became the home of the new unitary authority, North East Lincolnshire Council, at that time.

Works of art in the town hall include a portrait by George Jennison of King Edward VII.
