= Great Grimsby and Cleethorpes =

UK Parliament constituency (since 2024)

- County constituency for the House of Commons
- Interactive map of boundaries from 2024
- Boundary of Great Grimsby and Cleethorpes in Yorkshire and the Humber
- County: Lincolnshire
- Major settlements: Great Grimsby and Cleethorpes

Current constituency
- Created: 2024
- Member of Parliament: Melanie Onn (Labour)
- Seats: One
- Created from: Great Grimsby; Cleethorpes (part)

Great Grimsby and Cleethorpes is a constituency of the House of Commons in the UK Parliament. Further to the completion of the 2023 review of Westminster constituencies, it was first contested at the 2024 general election and has been represented in Parliament by Melanie Onn of the Labour Party since then. Onn was previously MP for the predecessor constituency of Great Grimsby from 2015 to 2019. The Conservative Party candidate, Lia Nici, was MP for Great Grimsby.

The constituency name refers to the Lincolnshire towns of Great Grimsby and Cleethorpes.

== Constituency profile ==
The Great Grimsby and Cleethorpes constituency is located in Lincolnshire and covers the connected towns of Grimsby (sometimes called Great Grimsby to distinguish it from the nearby village of Little Grimsby) and Cleethorpes. Grimsby was traditionally reliant on the fishing industry. The town continues to host the majority of the United Kingdom's fish-processing industry, however it experienced post-industrial decline after the Cod Wars of the 1970s which limited the ability of British ships to fish in Icelandic waters. Grimsby has high levels of deprivation, with much of the town falling within the top 10% most-deprived areas in England. Cleethorpes is a seaside resort town with a greater focus on tourism, and is comparatively wealthier than Grimsby. House prices in the constituency are very low, with the average price being less than half the national average.

In general, residents of the constituency have very low levels of education, income and professional employment. White people made up 96% of the population at the 2021 census. At the local council, most of the constituency is represented by Labour Party councillors, with some independents elected in the west of Grimsby and some Conservatives elected in Cleethorpes. Voters in the constituency overwhelmingly supported leaving the European Union in the 2016 referendum; an estimated 71% voted in favour of Brexit, making it one of the top 15 most Brexit-supporting constituencies out of 650 nationwide.

== Boundaries ==
The constituency is composed of the following electoral wards of the Borough of North East Lincolnshire:

- Croft Baker, East Marsh, Freshney, Haverstoe, Heneage, Park, Sidney Sussex, South, West Marsh, and Yarborough.

The seat covers:

- The previous Great Grimsby constituency, excluding the Scartho ward
- The town of Cleethorpes from the Cleethorpes constituency (abolished, with remaining parts forming the basis of the new constituency of Brigg and Immingham)

== Members of Parliament ==
Great Grimsby prior to 2024

Election	Member	Party
2024	Melanie Onn	Labour

== Elections ==
=== Elections in the 2020s ===
General election 2024: Great Grimsby and Cleethorpes
Party	Candidate	Votes	%	±%
Labour	Melanie Onn	15,336	41.9	+9.7
Reform UK	Oliver Freeston	10,533	28.8	+23.9
Conservative	Lia Nici	8,269	22.6	−33.0
Green	Ed Fraser	1,115	3.0	+1.0
Liberal Democrats	John Craig Lawson	1,036	2.8	−2.1
TUSC	Mark Gee	222	0.6	N/A
SDP	Christopher Stephenson	108	0.3	N/A
Majority		4,803	13.1	N/A
Turnout		36,619	46.4	−7.7
Registered electors		78,875		
Labour gain from Conservative		Swing		

=== Elections in the 2010s ===
2019 notional result
Party	Vote	%
Conservative	23,178	55.6
Labour	13,419	32.2
Liberal Democrats	2,052	4.9
Brexit Party	2,049	4.9
Green	821	2.0
Others	156	0.4
Turnout	41,675	54.1
Electorate	77,050	

== See also ==
- parliamentary constituencies in Humberside
- List of parliamentary constituencies in the Yorkshire and the Humber (region)
