= Melanie Onn =

British politician (born 1979)

Melanie Onn MP
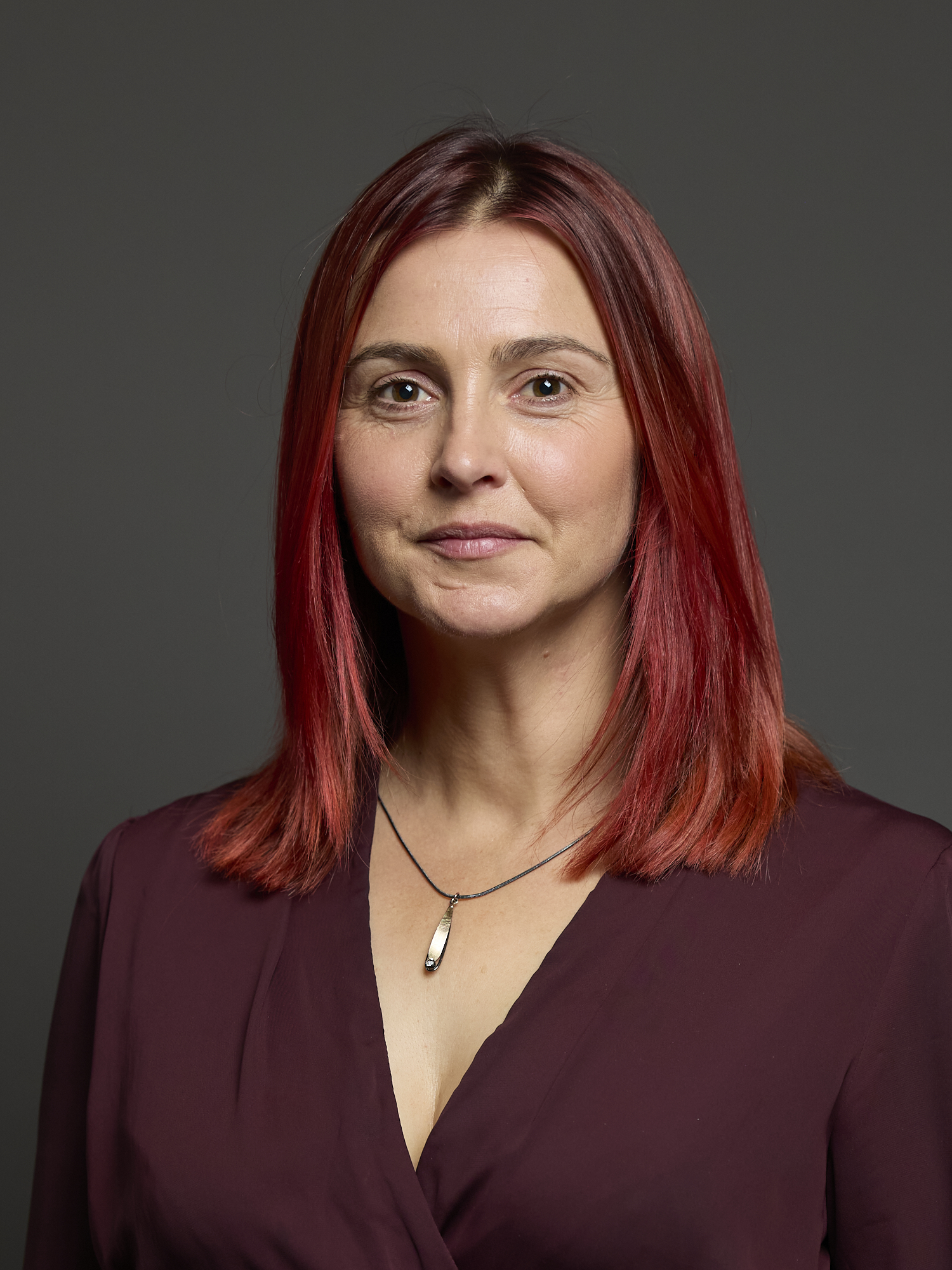
- Official portrait, 2024

Member of Parliament for Great Grimsby and Cleethorpes Great Grimsby (2015–2019)
- Incumbent
- Assumed office 4 July 2024
- Preceded by: Lia Nici
- Majority: 4,803 (13.1%)
- In office 7 May 2015 – 6 November 2019
- Preceded by: Austin Mitchell
- Succeeded by: Lia Nici

Personal details
- Born: 19 June 1979 (age 47) Grimsby, Lincolnshire, England
- Party: Labour
- Education: Middlesex University (BA)
- Website: melanieonn.org.uk

Melanie Onn (born 19 June 1979) is a British politician who has been Member of Parliament (MP) for Great Grimsby and Cleethorpes since 2024. A member of the Labour Party, she previously served as MP for Great Grimsby from 2015 to 2019.

Onn was Shadow Deputy Leader of the House of Commons from 2015 to 2016, and a Shadow Minister for Housing from 2017 to 2019. At the 2019 general election, she was defeated by Lia Nici, the Conservative candidate.

After leaving Parliament, Onn served as Deputy Chief Executive of RenewableUK from 2020 to 2023. At the 2024 general election, she was elected as MP for the new constituency of Great Grimsby and Cleethorpes, defeating Nici in a rematch.

== Early life and career ==
Melanie Onn was born in Grimsby on 19 June 1979. She grew up in the town and lived in two housing estates (Nunsthorpe and Grange). Onn attended Healing School and Franklin College. At the age of 17, after falling out with her aunt, with whom she had been living, Onn sought help from Doorstep, a Grimsby-based charity which provides housing support to young people. She graduated from the University of Middlesex with a degree in politics, international studies, and philosophy.

Onn worked for 10 years at the Labour Party's head office, becoming the head of the party's Compliance Unit. In 2009, she stood in the European Parliament elections for the Yorkshire and Humber region, placed fifth on Labour's regional list. From 2010, she was a regional organiser for the public sector trade union UNISON.

== Parliamentary career ==
Onn was selected as the Labour candidate for Great Grimsby from an all-women shortlist in July 2014, following the announcement that the sitting MP, Austin Mitchell, would retire at the next election. In the 2015 general election, she retained the seat for her party with a majority of 4,540, up from 714 in the previous election.

After having been elected, Onn met with the then Prime Minister David Cameron, to discuss the future of a Grimsby seafood firm, Young's Seafood, which was due to cut hundreds of jobs after losing a major contract to Sainsbury's.

Onn is an advocate of the renewable energy industry and has worked to promote the industry in Grimsby, which Tom Bawden in a 2016 article in The Independent newspaper described as the 'renewable energy capital of England'.

On 20 July 2015, she abstained from the vote on the second reading of Conservative government's Welfare Reform and Work Bill, which restricted child benefit to the first two children in a family and lowers the benefit cap from £26,000 to £20,000 per household. The bill was voted to the committee stage by 308 to 124 Members of Parliament, despite 48 Labour MPs disobeying the party line of abstention by voting against the bill. At the final third reading, Onn voted against the Welfare Reform and Work Bill along with all Labour MPs.

In September 2015, Onn was appointed Shadow Deputy Leader of the House of Commons, working alongside Shadow Leader Chris Bryant.

Onn campaigned for Britain to remain in the European Union, despite her constituency voting to leave by one of the largest margins in the country. Following the result, she voted in the House of Commons to trigger Article 50 of the Treaty on European Union, the process by which member states may withdraw from the European Union, stating that it would be 'wrong' to attempt to block the outcome of the referendum. In September 2017, she voted against the EU Withdrawal Bill, in line with the Labour party whip.

She was among many shadow ministers from Labour's frontbench to resign in summer 2016 in opposition to Jeremy Corbyn's leadership. She supported Owen Smith in the failed attempt to replace Corbyn in the 2016 Labour leadership election.

On 7 September 2016, Onn introduced a private members' bill to protect workers' rights in British law after Brexit. The bill was scheduled for its second reading in the House of Commons on 13 January 2017, but was successfully filibustered by Conservative members of Parliament.

On 3 July 2017, she returned to the Labour front bench in the position of Shadow Housing Minister.

During a Westminster Hall debate that she led in March 2018, Onn proposed that misogyny should be treated as hate crime.

On 27 March 2019, she resigned from the Labour front bench for a second time to vote against a second Brexit referendum. Onn voted for Boris Johnson's Brexit withdrawal agreement in Autumn 2019.

Onn is a campaigner to change the law to give greater protection to alleged rape victims. Following the R v Evans case, she said that "going through the victim's sexual history is much more likely to put people off reporting".

She chaired the All-Party Parliamentary Group on Inflammatory Bowel Disease. She is a member of Labour Friends of Israel and Labour Friends of Palestine & the Middle East.

At the 2019 general election, Onn stood for re-election and was one of the many Labour MPs to be defeated. Onn lost her Grimsby seat to Conservative Lia Nici. She won 10,819 votes compared with 18,150 votes for the Conservatives. Although she was expecting to lose, Onn later admitted she did not expect the margin of her loss to be so large – 7,331 votes.

At the 2024 general election, Onn was elected as the first MP for the redrawn constituency of Great Grimsby and Cleethorpes, winning with 15,336 votes. She had a majority of 4,803 over the second place candidate, Oliver Freeston of Reform UK. Upon being elected, Onn said "In 2015, I was elected as the first woman to represent my hometown in Parliament. Today, I stand before you as the first MP to represent this new constituency, the best constituency in the UK, Great Grimsby and Cleethorpes. Words are not enough to express how thankful I am to everyone who voted for me."

== Career outside of parliament ==
Onn served as deputy chief executive of RenewableUK from February 2020 to January 2023.

== Personal life ==
Onn married Christopher Jenkinson, a regional secretary for the trade union, UNISON, in 2014. She has a child.

Onn lives with Crohn's disease.

She is an Ambassador for the kinship care charity Mentor and a supporter of the Family Rights Group.

== See also ==
- List of people diagnosed with Crohn's disease

Parliament of the United Kingdom
Preceded by Austin Mitchell	Member of Parliament for Great Grimsby; 2015–2019	Succeeded by Lia Nici
