= 2026 North East Lincolnshire Council election =

Local election in Lincolnshire, England

- 7 May 2026

15 out of 42 seats to North East Lincolnshire Council 22 seats needed for a majority
	First party	Second party	Third party
Leader	Oliver Freeston	Emma Clough	Philip Jackson
Party	Reform	Labour	Conservative
Last election	Did not stand	15 seats, 40.3%	19 seats, 35.9%
Seats before	1	15	18
Seats won	14	0	0
Seats after	14	11	10
Seat change	▲13	▼4	▼8
Popular vote	18,197	5,625	7,137
Percentage	45.9%	14.2%	18.0%
Swing	N/A	▼26.1%	▼17.9%
	Fourth party	Fifth party
Leader		Nicola Aisthorpe
Party	Independent	Liberal Democrats
Last election	5 seats, 9.2%	3 seats, 11.7%
Seats before	5	3
Seats won	0	1
Seats after	4	3
Seat change	▼1	Steady
Popular vote	2,492	2,608
Percentage	6.3%	6.6%
Swing	▼2.9%	▼5.1%
- Winner of each seat at the 2026 North East Lincolnshire Council election.
Leader before election
Philip Jackson
Conservative
No overall control (Note: Conservative minority.)
Leader after election
Oliver Freeston
Reform
No overall control (Note: Reform minority.)

The 2026 North East Lincolnshire Council election was held on 7 May 2026, alongside the other local elections across the United Kingdom being held on the same day, to elect 15 of 42 members of North East Lincolnshire Council.

Prior to the election, the council was under no overall control. The Conservatives were the largest party and ran the council as a minority administration. At this election, the council remained under no overall control. Reform UK, which only held one seat on the council prior to the election, won 14 of the 15 seats contested and became the largest party on the council. The new Reform group chose Oliver Freeston to be its leader after the election. He was formally appointed as the new leader of the council at the subsequent annual meeting on 21 May 2026, leading a Reform minority administration.

== Council composition ==
After 2024 election		Before 2026 election		After 2026 election	
Party	Seats	Party	Seats	Party	Seats
Conservative	19	Conservative	18	Reform	14
Labour	15	Labour	15	Labour	11
Liberal Democrats	3	Liberal Democrats	3	Conservative	10
Reform	0	Reform	1	Liberal Democrats	3
Independent	5	Independent	5	Independent	4 (Note: Sit as part of the Independent for North East Lincolnshire group.)

Changes 2024–2026:

- May 2024: Oliver Freeston (Conservative) joins Reform

== Summary ==
=== Background ===
In 2024, the Conservatives lost the council to no overall control.

=== Election result ===
2026 North East Lincolnshire Council election
Party	This election				Full council			This election		
Party	Candidates	Seats	Net	Seats %	Other	Total	Total %	Votes	Votes %	+/−
Reform	{{{candidates}}}	14	▲13	93.3	0	14	33.3	18,197	45.9	N/A
Labour	{{{candidates}}}	0	▼4	0.0	11	11	26.2	5,625	14.2	–26.1
Conservative	{{{candidates}}}	0	▼8	0.0	10	10	23.8	7,137	18.0	–17.9
Independent	{{{candidates}}}	0	▼1	0.0	4	4	9.5	2,492	6.3	–2.9
Liberal Democrats	{{{candidates}}}	1	Steady	6.7	2	3	7.1	2,608	6.6	–5.1
Green	{{{candidates}}}	0	Steady	0.0	0	0	0.0	3,391	8.5	N/A
TUSC	{{{candidates}}}	0	Steady	0.0	0	0	0.0	175	0.4	–2.4
NHPUK	{{{candidates}}}	0	Steady	0.0	0	0	0.0	38	0.1	N/A
SDP	{{{candidates}}}	0	Steady	0.0	0	0	0.0	11	<0.1	N/A

== Incumbents ==
Ward	Incumbent councillor	Party	Re-standing
Croft Baker	Oliver Freeston (Note: Originally elected as a Conservative, but defected to Reform in May 2024.)	Reform	Yes
East Marsh	Stephen Beasant	Liberal Democrats	Yes
Freshney	Steve Holland	Independent	No
Haverstone	Margaret Cracknell	Conservative	Yes
Heneage	Kevin Shutt	Labour	Yes
Humberston & New Waltham	Stephen Harness	Conservative	Yes
Immingham	Stewart Swinburn	Conservative	Yes
Park	Paul Silvester	Conservative	Yes
Scartho	Ron Shepherd	Conservative	Yes
Sidney Sussex	Sophia Farren	Labour	No
South	Tim Mickleburgh	Labour	No
Waltham	Nick Pettigrew	Conservative	Yes
West Marsh	Kathryn Wheatley	Labour	Yes
Wolds	David Hasthorpe	Conservative	No
Yarborough	James Cairns	Conservative	Yes

== Ward results ==
Incumbents are marked with an asterisk (*).

=== Croft Baker ===
Croft Baker
Party	Candidate	Votes	%	±%
Reform	Oliver Freeston*	1,539	51.4	N/A
Labour	Janet Mager	596	19.9	−39.0
Green	Leon Brown	414	13.8	N/A
Conservative	Robert Tutass	246	8.2	−22.5
Liberal Democrats	Andy Harrison	98	3.3	−7.1
Independent	George Georgiou	88	2.9	N/A
TUSC	Julian Best	13	0.4	N/A
Majority		943	31.5	N/A
Turnout		2,994	35.5	+12.3
Registered electors		~8,434		
Reform hold				

=== East Marsh ===
East Marsh
Party	Candidate	Votes	%	±%
Liberal Democrats	Steve Beasant*	675	45.3	−12.5
Reform	Megan Dennis	515	34.5	N/A
Labour	Idee Charles	145	9.7	−23.7
Green	Megan Hussey	110	7.4	N/A
Conservative	Callum Procter	37	2.5	−6.3
TUSC	Lee Coulbeck	9	0.6	N/A
Majority		160	10.8	N/A
Turnout		1,491	21.8	+8.1
Registered electors		~6,839		
Liberal Democrats hold				

=== Freshney ===
Freshney
Party	Candidate	Votes	%	±%
Reform	Karen Batson	939	39.6	N/A
Independent	Dawn Merryweather	835	35.2	−19.5
Labour	Wendy Draper	231	9.8	−13.9
Conservative	David Christie	200	8.4	−9.6
Green	Simon Tatam	120	5.1	N/A
Liberal Democrats	Scarlett Lockhart	44	1.9	−0.1
Majority		104	4.4	N/A
Turnout		2,369	34.1	+8.4
Registered electors		~6,947		
Reform gain from Independent				

=== Haverstoe ===
Haverstoe
Party	Candidate	Votes	%	±%
Reform	Samuel Grice	1,756	49.7	N/A
Conservative	Margaret Cracknell*	1,020	28.9	−30.2
Labour	Ian Townsend	425	12.0	−18.6
Green	Joanna Craig	318	9.0	N/A
TUSC	Paul Wood	15	0.4	−2.2
Majority		736	20.8	N/A
Turnout		3,534	45.3	+16.4
Registered electors		~7,801		
Reform gain from Conservative				

=== Heneage ===
Heneage
Party	Candidate	Votes	%	±%
Reform	Ingrid Oliver	1,064	44.5	N/A
Liberal Democrats	Brian Barrett	565	23.6	+1.0
Labour	Kevin Shutt*	446	18.6	−29.5
Green	Leila Gomez-Fernandez	183	7.7	N/A
Conservative	Mark Smith	109	4.6	−19.4
TUSC	John Stiff	14	0.6	−4.7
SDP	Chris Stephenson	11	0.5	N/A
Majority		499	20.9	N/A
Turnout		2,392	30.2	+11.2
Registered electors		~7,623		
Reform gain from Labour				

=== Humberston & New Waltham ===
Humberston & New Waltham
Party	Candidate	Votes	%	±%
Reform	Simon Taylor	2,032	49.3	N/A
Conservative	Stephen Harness*	1,200	29.1	−26.9
Labour	Sylvia Moss	396	9.6	−20.7
Green	Michael Tobin	314	7.6	N/A
Liberal Democrats	Steve Hocknell	180	4.4	−6.2
Majority		832	20.2	N/A
Turnout		4,122	39.0	+16.0
Registered electors		~10,569		
Reform gain from Conservative				

=== Immingham ===
Immingham
Party	Candidate	Votes	%	±%
Reform	Blake Russell	1,481	51.5	N/A
Conservative	Stewart Swinburn*	640	22.3	−19.7
Labour	David Watson	374	13.0	−28.5
Green	Jay Fraser	251	8.7	N/A
Liberal Democrats	Luiza-Elena Oancea	103	3.6	−8.6
TUSC	David Mitchell	26	0.9	−3.4
Majority		841	29.2	N/A
Turnout		2,875	32.1	+11.8
Registered electors		~8,956		
Reform gain from Conservative				

=== Park ===
Park
Party	Candidate	Votes	%	±%
Reform	Nige Oliver	1,214	37.4	N/A
Labour	Amelia Bateman-Young	773	23.8	−20.6
Conservative	Paul Silvester*	587	18.1	−20.0
Green	James Gill	446	13.8	N/A
Liberal Democrats	David de Freitas	208	6.4	−8.9
TUSC	Heather Davis	15	0.5	−2.6
Majority		441	13.6	N/A
Turnout		3,243	37.2	+8.4
Registered electors		~8,718		
Reform gain from Conservative				

=== Scartho ===
Scartho
Party	Candidate	Votes	%	±%
Reform	Tony Charlesworth	1,579	44.3	N/A
Conservative	Ron Shepherd*	891	25.0	−19.6
Labour	Denis Doyle	593	16.6	−29.9
Green	Gabrielle Oliver	330	9.3	N/A
Liberal Democrats	Rob Wressell	172	4.8	−1.7
Majority		688	19.3	N/A
Turnout		3,565	38.1	+11.1
Registered electors		~9,357		
Reform gain from Conservative				

=== Sidney Sussex ===
Sidney Sussex
Party	Candidate	Votes	%	±%
Reform	Bob Callison	1,161	54.7	N/A
Labour	Lauren Smith	365	17.2	−33.5
Conservative	Joanne Christie	226	10.7	−20.3
Green	Leanne McConville	213	10.0	N/A
Liberal Democrats	Zach Kellerman	119	5.6	−3.9
TUSC	Mark Gee	37	1.7	−7.1
Majority		796	37.5	N/A
Turnout		2,121	26.4	+9.7
Registered electors		~8,034		
Reform gain from Labour				

=== South ===
South
Party	Candidate	Votes	%	±%
Reform	Paul Batson	1,081	56.9	N/A
Labour	Carole Doherty	420	22.1	−32.9
Conservative	Lottie Croft	211	11.1	−15.1
Liberal Democrats	Alastair Grigg	143	7.5	+1.9
TUSC	William Ward	46	2.4	+0.1
Majority		661	34.8	N/A
Turnout		1,901	22.2	+6.6
Registered electors		~8,563		
Reform gain from Labour				

=== Waltham ===
Waltham
Party	Candidate	Votes	%	±%
Reform	James Sawkins	1,037	42.0	N/A
Conservative	Nick Pettigrew*	956	38.7	−22.7
Labour	Vicky Hartung	202	8.2	−21.7
Green	Lorna Kirman	177	7.2	−1.5
Liberal Democrats	Gemma Marshall	98	4.0	N/A
Majority		81	3.3	N/A
Turnout		2,470	42.5	+11.8
Registered electors		~5,812		
Reform gain from Conservative				

=== West Marsh ===
West Marsh
Party	Candidate	Votes	%	±%
Reform	Tanya Brasted	574	49.7	N/A
Labour	Kathryn Wheatley*	259	22.4	−26.9
Green	David Dade	156	13.5	N/A
Conservative	Daniel Westcott	74	6.4	−5.8
Liberal Democrats	Aharon Wharton	54	4.7	−8.1
NHPUK	Angela Kingston	38	3.3	N/A
Majority		315	27.3	N/A
Turnout		1,155	22.1	+5.7
Registered electors		~5,226		
Reform gain from Labour				

=== Wolds ===
Wolds
Party	Candidate	Votes	%	±%
Reform	Darren Mayne	953	33.8	N/A
Independent	Jack Hilton	914	32.4	N/A
Conservative	Christine Vickers	547	19.4	−23.4
Green	Jonathan Kirman	171	6.1	+0.7
Labour	Frances Bovill	153	5.4	−10.3
Liberal Democrats	Ryan Aisthorpe	85	3.0	−33.1
Majority		39	1.4	N/A
Turnout		2,823	42.6	+14.3
Registered electors		~6,627		
Reform gain from Conservative				

=== Yarborough ===
Yarborough
Party	Candidate	Votes	%	±%
Reform	John Mills	1,272	48.6	N/A
Independent	Angela Greenfield	655	25.0	−25.0
Labour	Darci Metcalf	247	9.4	−17.3
Conservative	James Cairns	193	7.4	−11.9
Green	Ollie Sheldrake	188	7.2	N/A
Liberal Democrats	Jason Neilson	64	2.4	−0.3
Majority		617	23.6	N/A
Turnout		2,619	31.0	+10.0
Registered electors		~8,448		
Reform gain from Conservative				

== Post-election changes ==
=== Croft Baker by-election ===
Croft Baker by-election: 12 November 2026
Party	Candidate	Votes	%	±%
Reform	Melissa Grice	797	41.9	−9.5
Labour	Janet Mager	690	36.3	+16.4
Restore	Matthew Branson	150	7.9	N/A
Conservative	Stephen Harness	139	7.3	−0.9
Green	Leon Brown	91	4.8	−9.0
Independent	George Georgiou	35	1.8	−1.1
Majority		107	5.6	−25.9
Turnout		1902	22.8	−12.7
Reform gain from Labour		Swing		
