= Grimsby Combined Court Centre =

Court building in Grimsby, England

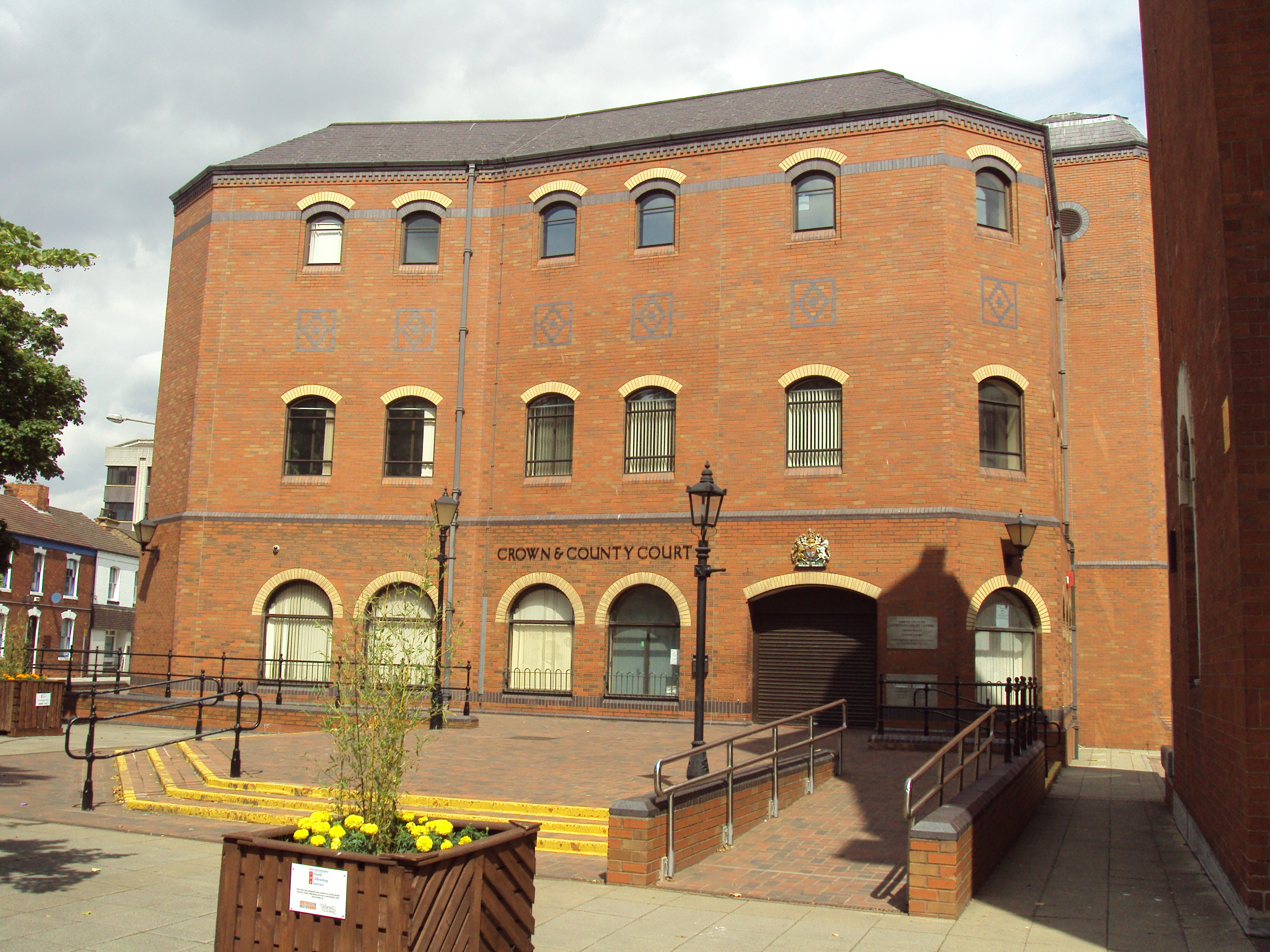
- Grimsby Combined Court Centre

- Shown in Lincolnshire
- 53.5656°N 0.0816°W
- Location: Town Hall Square, Grimsby

History
- Built: 1988

Site notes
- Architect: Property Services Agency
- Architectural style: Modernist style

Grimsby Combined Court Centre is a Crown Court venue which deals with criminal cases, as well as a County Court venue, which deals with civil cases, in Town Hall Square, Grimsby, England.

== History ==
Following the grant of a court of quarter sessions to the borough of Grimsby in 1891, hearings were typically held in the courtroom in Grimsby Town Hall. However, as the number of court cases in Grimsby grew, it became necessary to commission a courthouse with dedicated facilities for both Crown Court hearings, which require courtrooms suitable for trial by jury, and for County Court hearings. The site selected by the Lord Chancellor's Department, on the north side of Town Hall Square facing the town hall, had been occupied by the Tower Brewery which had closed in 1968.

The new building was designed by the Property Services Agency in the Modernist style, built in red brick at a cost of £4.8 million, and was completed in 1988. The design involved an asymmetrical main frontage of seven bays facing onto Town Hall Square but well set back from the road. A large part of the building projected out to the east behind the Municipal Offices. The two bays on the left were canted forward and the end bays were canted back. The left hand end bay was blind on all floors. There was an opening, containing a glass doorway, in the second bay from the right, and, above the opening, there was a Royal coat of arms mounted on the brickwork. The other bays on the ground floor were fenestrated by round headed windows, while the first and second floors were fenestrated by segmental headed windows. The ground floor opening and the windows on all three floors were all surmounted by voussoirs formed by cream coloured bricks, and there were diamond shapes formed by dark coloured bricks between the first and second floors. Internally, the building was laid out to accommodate five courtrooms.

Notable cases have included the trial and conviction of Marcel Reitman and Mathieu Poulissen, in June 2010, for heroin smuggling, the trial and conviction of Stephen Williams, in July 2013, for seven counts of rape and eight other sex offences, and the trial and conviction of Colin Smith, in February 2014, for eleven sex offences against a girl.
