= 2023 North East Lincolnshire Council election =

2023 English local election

← 2022	4 May 2023	2024 →

15 of 42 seats to North East Lincolnshire Council 22 seats needed for a majority
- Turnout: 23.12%

	First party	Second party	Third party
Leader	Philip Jackson	Matthew Patrick	n/a
Party	Conservative	Labour	Independent
Last election	30 seats, 47.3%	8 seats, 34.8%	1 seat, 4.9%
Seats won	7	5	2
Seats after	27	9	3
Seat change	▼3	▲1	▲2
Popular vote	11,039	10,121	2,551
Percentage	41.5%	38.1%	9.6%
Swing	▼5.8%	▲3.3%	▲4.7%
	Fourth party
Leader	Steve Beasant
Party	Liberal Democrats
Last election	3 seats, 10.6%
Seats won	1
Seats after	3
Seat change	Steady
Popular vote	1,856
Percentage	7.0%
Swing	▼3.6%
- The winner of each seat in the 2023 North East Lincolnshire Council Election
Leader before election
Philip Jackson
Conservative
Leader after election
Philip Jackson
Conservative

The 2023 North East Lincolnshire Council election took place on 4 May 2023 to elect 15 members (the usual approximate third) of North East Lincolnshire Council in Lincolnshire, England. This was on the same day as other local elections across England.

The Conservatives retained their majority on the council. After the election Labour changed their group leader, with Kathryn Wheatley replacing Matthew Patrick.

== Results summary ==
Following the results, the council remained under Conservative control.

2023 North East Lincolnshire Council election
Party	This election			Full council			This election		
Party	Seats	Net	Seats %	Other	Total	Total %	Votes	Votes %	+/−
Conservative	7	▼3	46.7	20	27	64.2	11,039	41.5	▼5.8
Labour	5	▲1	33.3	4	9	21.4	10,121	38.1	▲3.3
Independent	2	▲2	13.3	1	3	7.2	2,551	9.6	▲4.7
Liberal Democrats	1	Steady	6.7	2	3	7.2	1,856	7.0	▼3.6
TUSC	0	Steady	0.0	0	0	0.0	654	2.4	▲1.1
Green	0	Steady	0.0	0	0	0.0	368	1.4	▲0.6

== Ward results ==
Incumbents are marked with an asterisk (*).

=== Croft Baker ===
Croft Baker
Party	Candidate	Votes	%	±%
Labour Co-op	Malcolm Morland	969	52.2	+15.0
Conservative	Bob Callison*	782	42.1	−9.6
TUSC	Julian Best	107	5.7	+3.7
Majority		187	10.1	
Turnout		1,858	22.6	
Labour Co-op gain from Conservative		Swing		

=== East Marsh ===
East Marsh
Party	Candidate	Votes	%	±%
Liberal Democrats	Nicola Aisthorpe*	608	55.7	−4.4
Labour	Kay Rudd	373	34.2	+9.9
Conservative	Callum Procter	82	7.5	−6.7
TUSC	Lee Coulbeck	28	2.6	−4.7
Majority		235	21.5	
Turnout		1,091	16.0	
Liberal Democrats hold		Swing		

=== Freshney ===
Freshey
Party	Candidate	Votes	%	±%
Independent	Lyndsey Downes	964	46.3	New
Labour	Sheldon Mill	576	27.7	−3.6
Conservative	Anna Griffiths	294	14.1	19.1
Independent	Mick Kiff	146	11.9	New
Majority		388	18.6	
Turnout		2,080	29.2	
Independent gain from Conservative		Swing		

=== Haverstoe ===
Haverstoe
Party	Candidate	Votes	%	±%
Conservative	Keith Brookes*	1,464	63.0	−5.0
Labour	Samantha Brown	761	32.7	+0.7
TUSC	Cameron Warren	100	4.3	New
Majority		703	30.3	
Turnout		2,325	29.7	
Conservative hold		Swing		

=== Heneage ===
Heneage
Party	Candidate	Votes	%	±%
Labour	Matthew Patrick*	891	56.2	+15.6
Conservative	Trevor Crofts	511	32.2	+1.9
Liberal Democrats	Daniel Young	122	7.7	−19.7
TUSC	John Stiff	61	3.9	+2.3
Majority		380	24.0	
Turnout		1,585	20.3	
Labour hold		Swing		

=== Humberston and New Waltham ===
Humberston and New Waltham
Party	Candidate	Votes	%	±%
Conservative	Stan Shreeve*	1,534	63.7	−6.8
Labour	Ian Townsend	875	36.3	+6.8
Majority		659	27.4	
Turnout		2,409	24.8	
Conservative hold		Swing		

=== Immingham ===
Immingham
Party	Candidate	Votes	%	±%
Conservative	Karen Swinburn*	886	48.8	−6.5
Labour	Sam Wrexham Holborow	647	35.6	+1.8
Independent	Dave Barton	237	13.1	+4.0
TUSC	Nathan Newton	46	2.5	+0.7
Majority		239	13.2	
Turnout		1,816	20.5	
Conservative hold		Swing		

=== Park ===
Park
Party	Candidate	Votes	%	±%
Conservative	Marian Boyd*	869	40.0	−0.5
Labour	Edward Kaczmarek	741	34.1	6.3
Liberal Democrats	Ryan Aisthorpe	387	17.8	−11.3
Green	Andrew Dickson	126	5.8	New
TUSC	Dave Mitchell	52	2.3	−0.3
Majority		128	5.9	
Turnout		2,175	25.3	
Conservative hold		Swing		

=== Scartho ===
Scartho
Party	Candidate	Votes	%	±%
Conservative	Ian Lindley*	1,399	53.6	−2.7
Labour	Robson Augusta	1,097	43.9	+0.2
TUSC	Val Pow	63	2.5	New
Majority		302	9.7	
Turnout		2,499	28.3	
Conservative hold		Swing		

=== Sidney Sussex ===
Sidney Sussex
Party	Candidate	Votes	%	±%
Labour	Janet Haggis	793	54.0	+5.2
Conservative	Christine Vickers	545	37.1	−7.4
TUSC	Mark Gee	130	8.9	+2.2
Majority		248	16.9	
Turnout		1,468	18.7	
Labour hold		Swing		

=== South ===
South
Party	Candidate	Votes	%	±%
Labour	Janet Goodwin*	755	58.0	+5.7
Conservative	Andrew Burch	319	24.5	−13.9
Independent	Jane Bramley	87	6.7	New
Independent	Karen Batson	74	5.7	New
Independent	Phillip Moulson	45	3.4	New
TUSC	Bill Ward	22	1.7	−0.2
Majority		436	33.5	
Turnout		1,302	15.1	
Labour hold		Swing		

=== Waltham ===
Waltham
Party	Candidate	Votes	%	±%
Conservative	Philip Jackson*	1,052	61.4	−7.7
Labour	Peter Bailey	512	29.9	−1.0
Green	Lorna Kirman	148	8.7	New
Majority		540	31.5	
Turnout		1,712	30.7	
Conservative hold		Swing		

=== West Marsh ===
West Marsh
Party	Candidate	Votes	%	±%
Labour	Karl Wilson*	412	49.3	−3.4
Independent	Peter Barker	162	19.4	−27.9
Liberal Democrats	Marco Lawless	107	12.8	New
Conservative	Hugh Richies	102	12.2	New
Independent	Keith Watkin	31	3.7	New
TUSC	Heather Davis	21	2.6	New
Majority		250	29.9	
Turnout		835	16.4	
Labour hold		Swing		

=== Wolds ===
Wolds
Party	Candidate	Votes	%	±%
Conservative	Henry Hudson*	749	42.8	−8.2
Liberal Democrats	Loyd Emmerson	632	36.1	+12.5
Labour	Wil Wheaton Chapman	274	15.7	−2.7
Green	Jonathan Kirman	94	5.4	−1.6
Majority		117	6.7	
Turnout		1,749	28.3	
Conservative hold		Swing		

=== Yarborough ===
Yarborough
Party	Candidate	Votes	%	±%
Independent	Paul Henderson	805	44.1	New
Labour	David Watson	546	29.9	−17.9
Conservative	Garry Abel*	451	24.7	−27.5
TUSC	Phil Tuplin	24	1.3	New
Majority		259	14.2	
Turnout		1,826	21.5	
Independent gain from Conservative		Swing		
