= Lia Nici =

British politician (born 1969)

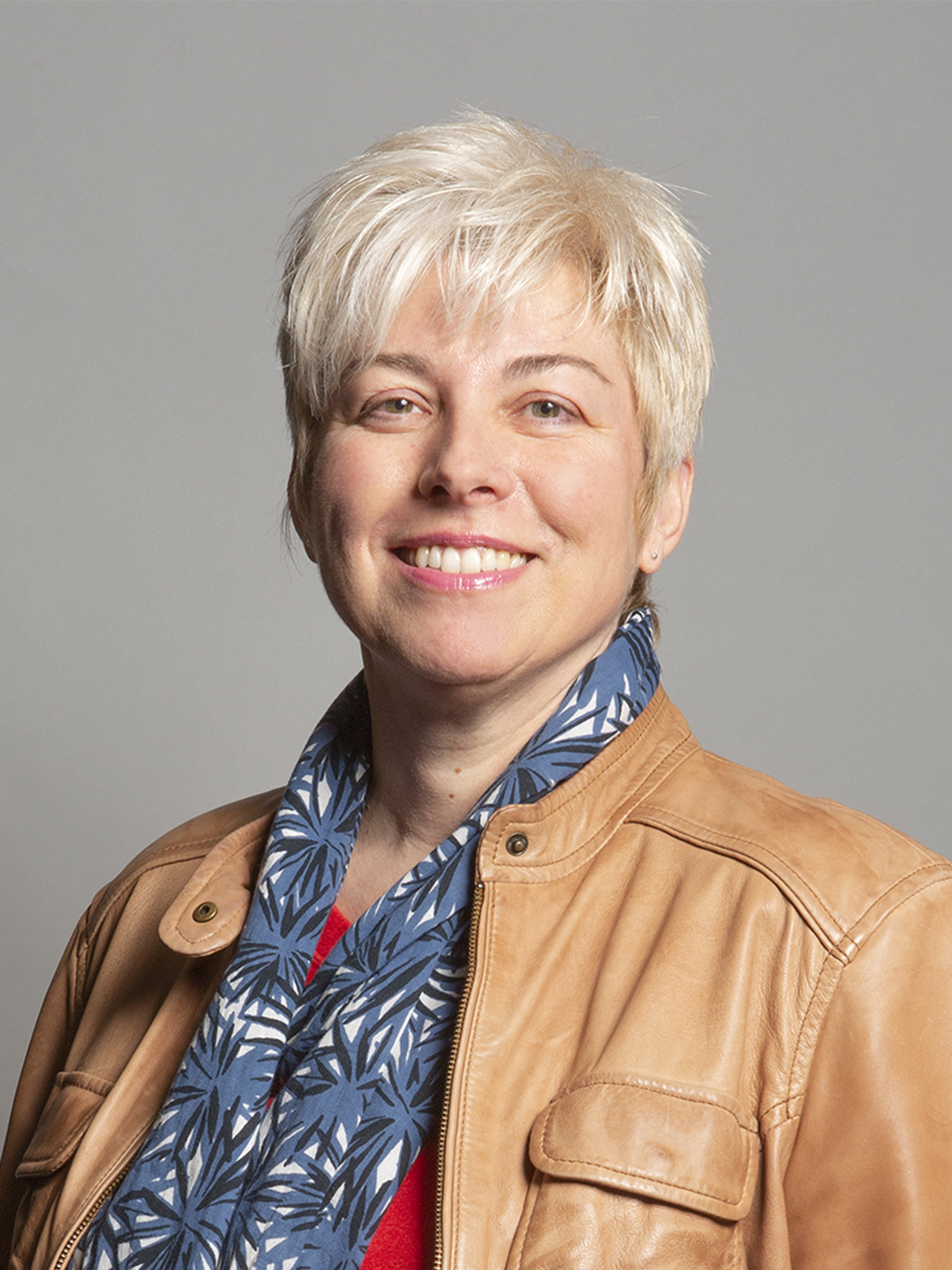
- Official portrait, 2019

Assistant Government Whip
- In office 20 September 2022 – 27 October 2022
- Prime Minister: Liz Truss

Parliamentary Under-Secretary of State for Levelling Up, The Union and Constitution
- In office 8 July 2022 – 20 September 2022
- Prime Minister: Boris Johnson
- Preceded by: Neil O'Brien
- Succeeded by: Dehenna Davison

Parliamentary Private Secretary to the Prime Minister
- In office 8 February 2022 – 8 July 2022 Serving with Joy Morrissey; James Duddridge
- Prime Minister: Boris Johnson
- Preceded by: Andrew Griffith; Sarah Dines
- Succeeded by: Alexander Stafford

Member of Parliament for Great Grimsby
- In office 12 December 2019 – 30 May 2024
- Preceded by: Melanie Onn
- Succeeded by: Melanie Onn

Personal details
- Born: 1 August 1969 (age 57) Grimsby, Lincolnshire, England
- Party: Reform UK (from December 2025)
- Other political affiliations: Conservative (until December 2025)
- Occupation: Politician
- Website: lianici.org.uk

Lia Nici-Townend (born 1 August 1969) is a British politician. She was Member of Parliament (MP) for Great Grimsby from the 2019 general election before losing her seat in 2024. She served as an Assistant Government Whip in the Truss government from September to October 2022. Nici defected from the Conservative Party to Reform UK in December 2025.

== Early life ==
Her father Romualdo Nici, from Pisa in Italy, ran an Italian restaurant in Cleethorpes. Her mother was a policewoman in the Grimsby area and later a social worker.

Nici attended Healing School and entered sixth form. She took an art foundation course at Grimsby College, later taking an HND in Audio Visual Studies at Northbrook College in Worthing, West Sussex from 1989 to 1991.

== Early career ==
Nici was a college lecturer for 20 years, including in the media studies department at what is now the Grimsby Institute, a further education college. She was head of East Coast Media at the institute from 2004.

She was the executive producer of Estuary TV, a Grimsby-based community interest company (CIC), from 2013 until the company was dissolved. Following its dissolution, she continued to act as CEO of Estuary TV (now a department of the institute, who had owned and dissolved the CIC). Nici has listed herself as having been self-employed since September 2018.

== Political career ==
Nici voted for the UK to remain in the EU in the 2016 United Kingdom European Union membership referendum. She subsequently became a supporter of leaving the EU and supported her party's approach to the exit process. In December 2019, she stated that the reason the UK had not left the EU was "a failure of people who live in northern towns like Grimsby who have Labour MPs who have consistently voted against the democratic vote in their constituencies."

=== Elections ===
After failing to be selected as parliamentary candidate in Great Grimsby and Scunthorpe, Nici stood as the Conservative candidate for the safe Labour seat of Kingston upon Hull North in 2017, losing to sitting Labour MP Diana Johnson by 14,322 votes.

In May 2018, Nici was elected as a councillor for the Scartho ward of North East Lincolnshire Council. In August 2019, she was selected as the Conservative candidate for Great Grimsby for the 2019 snap general election. She won the seat with 54.9% of the vote and a margin of 7,331 votes over Labour, who had held the seat for 74 years; defeating the sitting Labour MP Melanie Onn, who had represented Great Grimsby since Austin Mitchell's retirement in 2015.

In the 2024 General Election, held in July 2024, Nici stood in the Great Grimsby and Cleethorpes constituency, the successor to the Great Grimsby constituency, but lost her seat, coming in third place. constituency. Labour's Melanie Onn, who had held the Great Grimsby seat from 2015-2019, won the seat with 15,336 votes, with Reform UK's candidate Oliver Freeston receiving 10,533 votes and Lia Nici coming third with 8,269 votes.

=== Parliamentary career ===
In March 2020, Nici became a member of the Backbench Business Committee in the House of Commons.

In May 2020, Nici supported Prime Minister Boris Johnson's refusal to take action against his chief adviser Dominic Cummings after the latter breached COVID-19 lockdown regulations, maintaining only that it was possible "he may have committed a minor breach", and should have apologised.

In August 2020, Nici was one of 25 Conservative MPs and peers to sign a letter to Home Secretary Priti Patel urging "stronger enforcement" against people crossing the English Channel in small boats, considering it to be "strikingly clear that, rather than a 'hostile environment', invading migrants have been welcomed".

In October 2020, Nici was appointed a Parliamentary Private Secretary in the Department for Digital, Culture, Media and Sport, making her part of the payroll vote. Later that month, however, after being absent from voting on a Labour motion calling for the extension of free school meals into the school holidays, Nici said that she would have voted against the government had she been present.

During the United Kingdom's second national lockdown in November 2020, Nici self-isolated after attending a meeting in 10 Downing Street with the prime minister and several other Conservative MPs including Lee Anderson, who subsequently tested positive for COVID-19.

In March 2021, Nici used Twitter to suggest that people who "are not proud to be British, or of our flag or Queen [...] should move to another country". Following criticism, she refused to apologise for her comments, saying that "the flag and the Queen are big parts of life in this country, so if you dislike it, you can happily move elsewhere".

In a September 2021 interview with YouTuber Mahyar Tousi, Nici expressed her belief that "there are some very sinister, extreme left-wing things going on in our country and they're trying to lobby government and companies".

In December 2021, amid the Westminster lockdown parties controversy, Nici maintained that Johnson's moral authority had not been lost, and expressed her displeasure with whistleblowers who had brought attention to the matter, declaring that they "should be ashamed". Following Johnson's subsequent admission that he had attended a Downing Street garden party during the United Kingdom's first national lockdown, Nici defended him, stating that "nobody is perfect. The prime minister is a good man who wants to do the right thing for the UK and Grimsby." The following day, she asserted her belief that both the party and the leaks surrounding it were part of a plot against the prime minister by civil servants who did not want the United Kingdom to leave the EU.

In February 2022, Nici defended Johnson after his false claim that Keir Starmer was responsible for the failure of the Crown Prosecution Service to prosecute Jimmy Savile, alleging that the purported link between the two was "the number one issue for local people on social media" in the week before Johnson raised it in his response to the Sue Gray investigation into lockdown parties within government. The following week, Nici was appointed as a parliamentary private secretary to the prime minister.

In the 2022 vote of confidence in the Conservative Party leadership of Boris Johnson, Nici voted in favour of the Prime Minister. She later continued to openly support Johnson in the subsequent weeks up to his eventual resignation of the Conservative Party on 7 July. The day after Johnson's resignation, she was appointed as a parliamentary under-secretary of state at the Department for Levelling Up. On 10 July she repeated on the BBC allegations that Labour MP Angela Rayner crossed and uncrossed her legs to distract male MPs, an allegation originally made by an unnamed Conservative politician to the Mail on Sunday newspaper in April 2022. At the time Boris Johnson described the story about Rayner as "the most appalling load of sexist, misogynist tripe". On 19 June 2023, Nici abstained in the Commons vote to approve the Privileges Committee's report, which had found that Boris Johnson misled the House.

== Post-Parliamentary career ==
Following her defeat at the 2024 UK General Election, Nici worked as a freelance business, education and media consultant.

In December 2025, Nici's defection to Reform UK was announced, and she was appointed an advisor to Luke Campbell, the Reform UK Mayor of Hull and East Yorkshire.

Parliament of the United Kingdom
Preceded by Melanie Onn	Member of Parliament for Great Grimsby; 2019–2024	Constituency abolished
Political offices
Preceded by Andrew Griffith	Parliamentary Private Secretary to the Prime Minister; 2022; With: Sarah Dines; Joy Morrissey; Lia Nici	Succeeded by Alexander Stafford
