= 2018 North East Lincolnshire Council election =

2018 English local government election

Map showing the results of the 2018 North East Lincolnshire Council election

The 2018 North East Lincolnshire Council election took place on 3 May 2018 to elect members of North East Lincolnshire Council in England. This was on the same day as other local elections.

== Council make up ==
After the 2018 local election, the political make up of the council was as follows:

Party	Number of councillors
Labour	19 (+1)
Conservative	18 (+3)
Liberal Democrats	4 (−1)
Independent	1 (-)
UKIP	0 (−3)

Labour remained in minority control of the authority, with the support of Liberal Democrats. The authority was a target area for the Labour Party, hoping to regain seats that they had lost to UKIP in 2014. However, the Conservatives pulled off some unexpected victories in several wards on the authority, including wins in Freshney and Immingham for the first time since the late 2000s, and in Yarborough, Park and Croft Baker, where they hadn't won seats for over 25 years, long before NELC's creation.

Since the 2016 elections, former UKIP councillors Stephen Harness and Matthew Stinson who were sat as Independents at the time, joined the Conservative Party, while two further UKIP councillors, Nick Pettigrew and James Cairns, joined the Conservatives in 2017. Labour councillor Hazel Chase resigned her party and sat as an Independent, and would continue to do so after these elections, when she became the mayor for the 2018/19 municipal year. Liberal Democrat councillor Christina McGilligan-Fell quit her party in 2017 in protest at not being chosen as a parliamentary candidate for either Great Grimsby or Cleethorpes in the 2017 general election, and ran as an Independent in the former - losing her deposit. She rejoined the Liberal Democrats months after, in order to seek re-election under the party banner, but lost her seat nonetheless to the Conservatives. Less than a year after losing her seat, she was seen campaigning with the Conservatives for their candidate in her former ward in the 2019 local elections.

Two seats were fought in Immingham, due to the death of councillor Mike Burton in March 2018. Labour's Dave Bolton retained his seat on the authority by 3 votes after several recounts, but only for one year - the remaining term of office Burton had been elected for in 2015. The four-year seat was gained by Stewart Swinburn, a former Conservative councillor for the ward, who had lost his seat to Burton in 2011, and had failed to regain his seat in 2012, 2014 and 2016.

Shortly after these elections took place, a by-election was held to fill the vacancy in the Freshney ward in July 2018 due to the resignation of councillor Ray Sutton, following his decision to move out of the area. Labour's Sheldon Mill, who stood in Park in the elections in this set of elections, held the seat by a small margin of 42 votes over the Conservatives, but his win was short-lived and he lost the seat in the 2019 local elections to the Conservatives.

== Ward results ==
Vote share changes are compared with the 2016 elections, with the exceptions of Waltham, West Marsh and Wolds, which are compared with 2015.

=== Croft Baker ===
Croft Baker 2018
Party	Candidate	Votes	%	±%
Conservative	Oliver Daniel William Freeston	1,340	47.3	+31.2
Labour	Carole Anne Doherty	1,184	41.8	+1.3
UKIP	Clive Colam	163	5.8	−17.1
Green	James William Barker	143	5.1	+1.0
Majority		156	5.5	−12.1
Conservative gain from Labour		Swing		

Note: Incumbent Labour councillor Matthew Brown sought re-election in Yarborough having failed to be re-selected by party members here. This was also the first time the Liberal Democrats had not stood in Croft Baker since NELC's creation.

=== East Marsh ===
East Marsh 2018
Party	Candidate	Votes	%	±%
Liberal Democrats	Stephen Beasant	1,117	68.2	+11.0
Labour	Mark Patrick Gee	331	20.2	−12.0
Conservative	James Adam Chaudry	67	4.1	−1.0
UKIP	Phillip Andrew Moulson	59	3.6	N/A
Independent	Ronald Raymond Bull	50	3.1	N/A
Green	Catherine Susan Harper	15	0.9	N/A
Majority		786	48.0	+23.0
Liberal Democrats hold		Swing		

=== Freshney ===
Freshney 2018
Party	Candidate	Votes	%	±%
Conservative	Callum Terence Procter	878	45.0	+23.5
Labour	Stefan Leon Allan	793	40.6	−8.3
UKIP	Barry Charles Fisher	180	9.2	−15.0
Green	Andrew Lingwood	83	4.3	+0.5
TUSC	Val Pow	17	0.9	−0.7
Majority		85	4.4	−20.3
Conservative gain from UKIP		Swing		

Note: There was a recount ahead of the declaration of the result. Incumbent councillor Nick Pettigrew, who had since defected to the Conservatives, sought re-election in Waltham - which his new party had deemed a more likely seat he would win, but the new Conservative candidate narrowly won nonetheless.

=== Haverstoe ===
Haverstoe 2018
Party	Candidate	Votes	%	±%
Conservative	Margaret Cracknell	2,211	71.1	+9.2
Labour	Jack Stuart Mariner Rodwell	694	22.3	+1.1
Green	Steven Michael Anthony Roper	203	6.5	+1.4
Majority		1,517	48.8	+8.1
Conservative hold		Swing		

=== Heneage ===
Heneage 2018
Party	Candidate	Votes	%	±%
Labour	Chris Nichols	996	48.7	+1.3
Conservative	Mark Smith	681	33.3	+16.1
UKIP	John Matthew Stockton	322	15.7	−9.3
TUSC	Val O’Flynn	46	2.2	−0.3
Majority		315	15.4	−7.0
Labour gain from UKIP		Swing		

Notes: Smith had fought this seat as an Independent in 2012 and for UKIP in 2015. O'Flynn quit TUSC only days before the election took place. This was the first time since 1995 that there was no Liberal Democrat candidate in the ward.

=== Humberston & New Waltham ===
Humberston & New Waltham 2018
Party	Candidate	Votes	%	±%
Conservative	Stephen William Harness	2,557	81.1	+27.7
Labour	Sean Lawrence Willis	595	18.9	+0.2
Majority		1,962	62.2	+33.8
Conservative gain from UKIP		Swing		

Note: Harness had been elected as a UKIP councillor for this ward in 2013 and 2014, so an effective hold for him.

=== Immingham ===
Immingham 2018
Party	Candidate	Votes	%	±%
Conservative	Stewart Swinburn	1,227	46.2	+6.0
Labour	David Bolton	1,005	37.8	−4.5
Conservative	Karen Doris Swinburn	1,002	37.7	−2.5
Labour	Marian Jervis	737	27.7	−14.6
Independent	Willie Weir	654	24.6	N/A
Green	Charlotte Louise Emerson	227	8.5	+1.5
Majority		3		
Conservative gain from Labour		Swing		
Labour hold		Swing		

Note: Two seats were fought in Immingham, due to the death of councillor Mike Burton in March 2018. Labour's Dave Bolton retained his seat after several recounts due to the closeness of the result, but only for one year, which was the remaining term of office Burton had been elected for in 2015. The four-year seat was gained by Stewart Swinburn, a former Conservative councillor for the ward, who had lost his seat to Burton in 2011 and had failed to regain a seat in Immingham in 2012, 2014 and 2016. His wife, Karen, who had been unsuccessful on this occasion, had been a councillor for Immingham between 2006 and 2010.

=== Park ===
Park 2018
Party	Candidate	Votes	%	±%
Conservative	Paul Silvester	1,012	34.9	+15.7
Labour	Sheldon James Mill	814	28.1	+6.2
Liberal Democrats	Christina Ann McGilligan-Fell	788	27.2	−5.0
UKIP	Tony Blake	146	5.0	−15.8
Green	Jacqueline Vessey	108	3.7	−0.7
TUSC	Julian Darren Best	33	1.1	−0.3
Majority		198	6.8	−3.5
Conservative gain from Liberal Democrats		Swing		

Note: This was only the second occasion the Liberal Democrats had lost Park since NELC's creation (the first being when Labour gained it in 2012), in addition to being the first time the Conservatives had won Park on NELC.

=== Scartho ===
Scartho 2018
Party	Candidate	Votes	%	±%
Conservative	Lia Nici	1,674	54.9	+19.7
Labour	Peter Kenneth Bailey	839	27.5	−0.8
Liberal Democrats	David Michael De Freitas	362	11.9	+1.0
UKIP	Beckey Jane Brumpton	175	5.7	−19.2
Majority		835	27.4	+20.5
Conservative gain from UKIP		Swing		

Note: Bailey was formerly a Lib Dem councillor for Yarborough between 2009 and 2012. Incumbent UKIP councillor Henry Hudson chose not to seek re-election.

=== Sidney Sussex ===
Sidney Sussex 2018
Party	Candidate	Votes	%	±%
Labour	Debbie Rodwell	1,062	52.6	+6.9
Conservative	Steve Holland	666	33.0	+18.7
UKIP	Tanya Brasted	205	10.1	−21.1
Green	Andy Dickson	87	4.3	N/A
Majority		396	19.6	+5.1
Labour gain from UKIP		Swing		

Note: Rodwell was the only Labour candidate to have won more than 50% vote share on the night.

=== South ===
South 2018
Party	Candidate	Votes	%	±%
Labour	Tim Mickleburgh	706	39.7	−14.0
Conservative	Paul David Batson	409	23.0	+8.2
UKIP	Jane Elizabeth Bramley	318	17.9	−10.5
Independent	Deborah Elsie Florence May Hill	239	13.4	N/A
Green	Loyd Layton Emmerson	107	6.0	N/A
Majority		297	16.7	−8.6
Labour gain from UKIP		Swing		

Notes: Mickleburgh had been a West Marsh councillor since 2014 but was deselected by local members. Batson had previously fought this seat for UKIP in 2015 and fought it for the Conservatives in the June 2016 by-election.

=== Waltham ===
Waltham 2018
Party	Candidate	Votes	%	±%
Conservative	Nick Pettigrew	1,766	83.7	+29.0
Labour	Karl Andrew Quibell	344	16.3	−5.0
Majority		1,422	67.4	+34.0
Conservative hold		Swing		

Note: Pettigrew had been a councillor in Freshney since 2014 (originally elected as UKIP, having joined the Tories in 2017).

=== West Marsh ===
West Marsh 2018
Party	Candidate	Votes	%	±%
Labour	Gemma Louise Sheridan	510	49.6	+8.9
Independent	Keith Watkin	210	20.4	+11.7
Conservative	David George Townend	165	16.1	+6.0
UKIP	Anna-Karina Gregersen	122	11.9	−12.4
TUSC	Dave Mitchell	21	2.0	−1.2
Majority		300	29.2	+12.8
Labour hold		Swing		

Note: Watkin had been a councillor for this ward between 1999 and 2010.

=== Wolds ===
Wolds 2018
Party	Candidate	Votes	%	±%
Conservative	David Anthony Hasthorpe	1,401	75.1	+22.7
Labour	Ian Stuart Rodwell	465	24.9	+1.2
Majority		936	50.2	+21.5
Conservative hold		Swing		

=== Yarborough ===
Yarborough 2018
Party	Candidate	Votes	%	±%
Conservative	James David Cairns	956	47.3	+24.8
Labour	Matthew Jason Brown	690	34.1	−5.0
UKIP	Liudmila Berezina	207	10.2	−18.4
TUSC	Kieran Ian Barlow	168	8.3	+7.3
Majority		366	13.2	+2.7
Conservative gain from UKIP		Swing		

Note: Cairns had been a councillor here since 2014 (originally elected as UKIP, having joined the Tories in 2017), so effectively a hold for him.
