= 2011 North East Lincolnshire Council election =

2011 UK local government election

The 2011 North East Lincolnshire Council election was held on Thursday 5 May 2011 to elect 15 members to North East Lincolnshire Council, the same day as other local elections in the United Kingdom. It elected approximately one-third of the council's 42 members to a four-year term. The turnout across the entire council was 34.5%. The council remained under no overall control.

== Results summary ==
2011 North East Lincolnshire Council election
Party	This election			Full council			This election		
Party	Seats	Net	Seats %	Other	Total	Total %	Votes	Votes %	+/−
Labour	9	▲7	60.0	8	17	40.5	14,202	35.8	
Conservative	5	▼1	33.3	9	14	33.3	12,335	31.1	
Liberal Democrats	1	▼5	6.7	10	11	26.2	7,346	18.5	
UKIP	0	Steady	0.0	0	0	0.0	3,730	9.4	
Independent	0	▼1	0.0	0	0	0.0	1,926	4.9	
Green	0	Steady	0.0	0	0	0.0	86	0.2	
TUSC	0	Steady	0.0	0	0	0.0	38	0.1	

== Ward results ==
=== Croft Baker ===
Croft Baker
Party	Candidate	Votes	%	±%
Labour	Michale Burnett*	1,619	53.2	▲18.1
Conservative	Bob Callison	964	31.7	▲9.5
Liberal Democrats	Colin Eastwell	460	15.1	▼19.7
Majority		655	21.5	▲21.2
Total valid votes		3,043	35.2	
Turnout			35.6	
Registered electors		8,642		
Labour hold		Swing	▲4.3	

=== East Marsh ===
East Marsh
Party	Candidate	Votes	%	±%
Labour	Terry Walker	849	49.1	▲14.7
Liberal Democrats	Anthony McCabe*	514	29.7	▼26.0
Conservative	Phillip Dumbrell	185	10.7	▲0.8
UKIP	Nigel Wright	182	10.5	New
Majority		335	19.4	N/A
Total valid votes		1,730	23.1	
Turnout			23.3	
Registered electors		7,495		
Labour gain from Liberal Democrats		Swing	▲20.3	

=== Freshney ===
Freshney
Party	Candidate	Votes	%	±%
Labour	Ray Sutton	1,011	41.1	▲10.0
Liberal Democrats	David Boylen*	709	28.9	▼5.9
Conservative	Paul Fieldgate	469	19.1	▼12.1
UKIP	Paul Wood	268	10.9	New
Majority		302	12.3	N/A
Total valid votes		2,457	33.1	
Turnout			33.2	
Registered electors		7,431		
Labour gain from Liberal Democrats		Swing	▲8.0	

=== Haverstoe ===
Haverstoe
Party	Candidate	Votes	%	±%
Conservative	Keith Brookes*	2,104	59.7	▼5.3
Labour	Rhys Harrison	969	27.5	▲10.0
Liberal Democrats	Roy Horobin	451	12.8	▼4.7
Majority		1,135	32.2	▼15.2
Total valid votes		3,524	43.5	
Turnout			43.8	
Registered electors		8,106		
Conservative hold		Swing	▼7.6	

=== Heneage ===
Heneage
Party	Candidate	Votes	%	±%
Labour	Matthew Patrick	1,089	43.6	▲9.6
Liberal Democrats	Stephen Hocknell*	585	23.4	▼19.8
Conservative	Stephen Kibble	525	21.0	▼1.7
UKIP	Nicholas Pettigrew	299	12.0	New
Majority		504	20.2	N/A
Total valid votes		2,498	30.2	
Turnout			30.4	
Registered electors		8,272		
Labour gain from Liberal Democrats		Swing	▲14.7	

=== Humberston and New Waltham ===
Humberston and New Waltham
Party	Candidate	Votes	%	±%
Conservative	Steve Norton*	1,327	37.9	▼3.0
Labour	Matthew Barrow	756	21.6	▲6.5
UKIP	Stephen Harness	663	19.0	New
Independent	Margaret Solomon	616	17.6	▼20.1
Liberal Democrats	Christopher Stanland	136	3.9	▼2.4
Majority		571	16.3	▲13.1
Total valid votes		3,498	40.5	
Turnout			40.6	
Registered electors		8,645		
Conservative hold		Swing	▼4.7	

=== Immingham ===
Immingham
Party	Candidate	Votes	%	±%
Labour	Mike Burton	1,506	46.8	▲8.2
Conservative	Stewart Swinburn*	1,099	34.2	▼9.1
Independent	Willie Weir	522	16.2	New
Independent	Victor Banks (Note: Victor Banks ran as the candidate for the Liberal Democrats in 2007, and the change in vote share is with respect to the share received in that election.)	90	2.8	▼15.3
Majority		407	12.7	N/A
Total valid votes		3,217	37.6	
Turnout			37.9	
Registered electors		8,553		
Labour gain from Conservative		Swing	▲8.6	

=== Park ===
Park
Party	Candidate	Votes	%	±%
Liberal Democrats	Andrew de Freitas*	1,463	42.0	▼5.8
Conservative	Ann Furneaux	1,165	34.4	▲12.4
Labour	Timothy Mickleburgh	855	24.5	▲13.0
Majority		298	8.6	▼17.3
Total valid votes		3,483	38.7	
Turnout			39.3	
Registered electors		9,000		
Liberal Democrats hold		Swing	▼9.1	

=== Scartho ===
Scartho
Party	Candidate	Votes	%	±%
Conservative	Alex Baxter	1,197	37.7	▼12.4
Labour	Marian Jervis	776	24.4	▲8.6
UKIP	Ronald Shepherd	648	20.4	New
Liberal Democrats	Sally Dixon	473	14.9	▼19.2
Independent	Ernie Brown	84	2.6	New
Majority		421	13.2	▼2.7
Total valid votes		3,178	39.4	
Turnout			39.8	
Registered electors		8,057		
Conservative hold		Swing	▼10.5	

=== Sidney Sussex ===
Sidney Sussex
Party	Candidate	Votes	%	±%
Labour	Hazel Chase	1,118	47.1	▲9.5
Liberal Democrats	Peter Burgess*	581	24.5	▼14.5
Conservative	David Hasthorpe	437	18.4	▼5.0
UKIP	Karl Simmons	238	10.0	New
Majority		537	22.6	N/A
Total valid votes		2,374	28.5	
Turnout			28.7	
Registered electors		8,331		
Labour gain from Liberal Democrats		Swing	▲12.0	

=== South ===
South
Party	Candidate	Votes	%	±%
Labour	Norma Lincoln*	1,141	54.5	▲12.4
Liberal Democrats	Doug Pickett	496	23.7	▼16.9
UKIP	John Stockton	456	21.8	New
Majority		645	30.8	▲29.3
Total valid votes		2,093	25.0	
Turnout			25.0	
Registered electors		8,372		
Labour hold		Swing	▲14.6	

=== Waltham ===
Waltham
Party	Candidate	Votes	%	±%
Conservative	Philip Jackson*	1,270	54.6	▼9.6
Labour	Jack Connor	543	23.3	▲10.7
Liberal Democrats	Paul Barton	356	15.3	▼7.8
UKIP	Scott Owen	157	6.7	New
Majority		727	31.26	▼9.8
Total valid votes		2,326	41.3	
Turnout			41.6	
Registered electors		5,633		
Conservative hold		Swing	▼10.2	

=== West Marsh ===
West Marsh
Party	Candidate	Votes	%	±%
Labour	Darren Billard	465	37.6	▲17.3
Independent	Peter Barker*	398	32.2	▼39.0
Independent	Keith Watkin	216	17.5	New
UKIP	Philip Wilson	120	9.7	New
TUSC	James Cartwright	38	3.1	New
Majority		67	5.4	N/A
Total valid votes		1,237	24.4	
Turnout			24.8	
Registered electors		5,073		
Labour gain from Independent		Swing	▲28.1	

=== Wolds ===
Wolds
Party	Candidate	Votes	%	±%
Conservative	Melanie Dickerson*	1,151	48.9	▼13.7
Labour	Julian Dugard	575	24.4	▲8.9
UKIP	Henry Hudson	418	17.8	New
Liberal Democrats	Gordon Smith	208	8.8	▼13.0
Majority		576	24.5	▼16.3
Total valid votes		2,352	40.7	
Turnout			41.0	
Registered electors		5,775		
Conservative hold		Swing	▼11.3	

=== Yarborough ===
Yarborough
Party	Candidate	Votes	%	±%
Labour	Peter Wheatley	930	35.1	▲13.4
Liberal Democrats	Les Bonner*	914	34.5	▼2.4
Conservative	Harry Hall	442	16.7	▲0.7
UKIP	James Cairns	281	10.6	New
Green	Vicky Dunn	86	3.2	New
Majority		16	0.6	N/A
Total valid votes		2,653	31.5	
Turnout			31.7	
Registered electors		8,429		
Labour gain from Liberal Democrats		Swing	▲7.9	
