= 2016 North East Lincolnshire Council election =

2016 UK local government election

2016 local election results in North East Lincolnshire

The 2016 North East Lincolnshire Council election took place on 5 May 2016 to elect members of North East Lincolnshire Council in England. This was on the same day as other local elections.

== Council make up ==
After the 2016 local election, the political make up of the council was as follows:

Party	Number of councillors
Labour	18
Conservative	11
Liberal Democrats	5
UKIP	5
Green	0
Independent	2
Vacant	1

Labour remained in minority control of the authority, despite losing one seat (Park) to the Liberal Democrats and failing to regain the East Marsh seat they lost to UKIP in a by-election the previous year, which was gained by the Liberal Democrats as UKIP didn't field a candidate in that ward. These were the first gains by the Liberal Democrats in the borough since the 2008 local elections, prior to being almost wiped out over the next four years.

Since the previous year's elections, two UKIP councillors (Matthew Stinson and Stephen Harness) resigned from their party and sat as Independents, and would go on to join the Conservatives, while Ron Shepherd by this point had already defected directly to the Conservatives and successfully defended his seat in Scartho at these elections in the process.

Shortly after these elections took place, a by-election was held to fill the vacancy in the South ward in June 2016 due to the resignation of councillor Chris Stanland in the South ward. Although he resigned before these local elections, it happened after close of nominations. Labour held the seat and thus increased their number of councillors to 19.

== Ward results ==
=== Croft Baker ===
Croft Baker 2016
Party	Candidate	Votes	%	±%
Labour	Kathryn Helen Wheatley	975	40.5	
UKIP	Victoria Jane Mutton	551	22.9	
Conservative	Michael Rudkin	389	16.1	
Liberal Democrats	Roy Horobin	348	14.4	
Green	James William Barker	99	4.1	
TUSC	Kieran Ian Barlow	48	2.0	
Majority		424	17.6	
Labour hold		Swing		

=== East Marsh ===
East Marsh 2016
Party	Candidate	Votes	%	±%
Liberal Democrats	Kay Rudd	901	57.2	
Labour	Neil Martin Trenchard	507	32.2	
TUSC	Phil Tuplin	87	5.5	
Conservative	James Adam Chaudry	81	5.1	
Majority		394	25.0	
Liberal Democrats gain from Labour		Swing		

=== Freshney ===
Freshney 2016
Party	Candidate	Votes	%	±%
Labour	Cliff Barber	876	48.9	
UKIP	Guy Thomas Twisleton Haxby	434	24.2	
Conservative	Max Logan Burnett	386	21.5	
Green	Andy Lingwood	68	3.8	
TUSC	Julian Darren Best	29	1.6	
Majority		442	24.7	
Labour hold		Swing		

=== Haverstoe ===
Haverstoe 2016
Party	Candidate	Votes	%	±%
Conservative	Bill Parkinson	1,650	61.9	
Labour	Stephen Russell Naulls	566	21.2	
Liberal Democrats	Katherine Collett	227	8.5	
Green	Catherine Susan Harper	136	5.1	
TUSC	Cameron James William Edward Allan Best	88	3.3	
Majority		1084		
Conservative hold		Swing		

=== Heneage ===
Heneage 2016
Party	Candidate	Votes	%	±%
Labour	Ros James	948	47.4	
UKIP	Stephen Whittingham	500	25.0	
Conservative	Holly Joanne Amanda Hill	345	17.2	
Liberal Democrats	Gloria Lond	158	7.9	
TUSC	Val O’Flynn	51	2.5	
Majority		448	22.4	
Labour hold		Swing		

=== Humberston & New Waltham ===
Humberston & New Waltham 2016
Party	Candidate	Votes	%	±%
Conservative	John Fenty	1,481	53.4	
UKIP	Monica Ruth Brasted	693	25.0	
Labour	Chris Nichols	519	18.7	
Green	Andy Dickson	54	1.9	
TUSC	David William Mitchell	29	1.0	
Majority		788	28.4	
Conservative hold		Swing		

=== Immingham ===
Immingham 2016
Party	Candidate	Votes	%	±%
Labour	David Aaron Watson	1,128	42.3	
Conservative	Stewart Swinburn	1,073	40.2	
TUSC	Richard Cragg	282	10.6	
Green	Martin Leslie Reed	186	7.0	
Majority		55	2.1	
Labour hold		Swing		

=== Park ===
Park 2016
Party	Candidate	Votes	%	±%
Liberal Democrats	Ian Philip Barfield	905	32.2	
Labour	Jonathan Martyn Spurr	617	21.9	
UKIP	Tony Blake	586	20.8	
Conservative	Martin Peter Johnson	541	19.2	
Green	Vicky Dunn	124	4.4	
TUSC	Ian Michael Radford	39	1.4	
Majority		288	10.3	
Liberal Democrats gain from Labour		Swing		

=== Scartho ===
Scartho 2016
Party	Candidate	Votes	%	±%
Conservative	Ron Shepherd	1,011	35.2	
Labour	Janet Angela Goodwin	813	28.3	
UKIP	Beckey Jane Brumpton	716	24.9	
Liberal Democrats	David Michael De Freitas	313	10.9	
TUSC	Joe Carter	18	0.6	
Majority		198	6.9	
Conservative gain from UKIP		Swing		

=== Sidney Sussex ===
Sidney Sussex 2016
Party	Candidate	Votes	%	±%
Labour	Catherine Margaret Gaynor Rogers	787	45.7	
UKIP	Tanya Brasted	538	31.2	
Conservative	Callum Procter	246	14.3	
Liberal Democrats	Graham Robert Nicholson	83	4.8	
TUSC	Angela Heather Greenfield	68	3.9	
Majority		249	14.5	
Labour hold		Swing		

=== South ===
South 2016
Party	Candidate	Votes	%	±%
Labour	Ray Oxby	913	53.7	
UKIP	Ludmila Berezina	483	28.4	
Conservative	Richard Hardy	251	14.8	
TUSC	Karen Michelle Manley	54	3.2	
Majority		430	25.3	
Labour hold		Swing		

=== Yarborough ===
Yarborough 2016
Party	Candidate	Votes	%	±%
Labour	Jane Diana Hyldon-King	1,012	48.3	
UKIP	Jane Whittingham	590	28.2	
Conservative	Deborah Elsie Florence May Hill	453	21.6	
TUSC	Val Pow	40	1.9	
Majority		422	20.1	
Labour hold		Swing		
