= 2019 North East Lincolnshire Council election =

UK local government election

Results of the 2019 North East Lincolnshire Council election

The 2019 North East Lincolnshire Council election took place on 2 May 2019 to elect members of North East Lincolnshire Council in England. This was on the same day as other local elections.

== Council make up ==
After the 2019 local election, the political make up of the council was as follows:

| Party | Number of councillors |
|---|---|
| Conservative | 23 (+5) |
| Labour | 14 (−5) |
| Liberal Democrats | 4 (-) |
| Independent | 0 (−1) |
| UKIP | 1 (+1) |

The Conservatives won a majority on the council for the first time since its creation in 1996. Some of the authority's predecessors had previously had Conservative majorities: Great Grimsby Borough Council (1976-1979) and Humberside County Council (1977-1981), though Cleethorpes Borough Council had not. The Conservative gains in the five wards were essentially a repeat of the previous year: taking Yarborough, Freshney, Croft Baker and Immingham from Labour, as well as Park from the Liberal Democrats. UKIP, who had been slowly wiped out after losing councillors through defections to the Conservatives after the EU referendum had lost their remaining "loyal" councillors in 2018, though Jane Bramley did regain a seat from Labour in South ward, where two seats were fought following the resignation of former council leader Ray Oxby.

The Green Party, who had run candidates in most but not all wards in 2018, only ran one candidate - Loyd Emmerson, who had been their general election candidate in Cleethorpes in 2017 (and would stand for them in Great Grimsby in 2019), stood in South ward.]

In the run up to these elections, Terry Walker (then a Labour councillor for East Marsh and deputy mayor of the authority) defected to the Liberal Democrats and would successfully retain his seat in the ward for them, which resulted in him being elected the mayor of the authority in a vote by councillors. Other changes saw Ray Oxby unexpectedly resign as council leader and as a councillor for South ward in March 2019, which meant two seats were fought in the ward much like Immingham the year before.

Longstanding councillors Andrew De Freitas from the Lib Dems and Melanie Dickerson from the Conservatives retired at these elections. De Freitas' son David stood as his party's candidate in Park ward, which he failed to retain, whilst former UKIP councillor Henry Hudson who had stood down last year in Scartho ward returned to the Conservatives, for whom he had been a candidate for in 2008, to stand in Wolds to succeed Dickerson.

== Ward results ==
=== Croft Baker ===
Croft Baker
| Party | Candidate | Votes | % | ±% |
|---|---|---|---|---|
| Conservative | Bob Callison | 1,049 | 46.7 | −0.6 |
| Labour | Judy Nichols | 808 | 36.0 | −5.8 |
| Liberal Democrats | Roy Horobin | 388 | 17.3 | New |
| Majority | | | | |
| Turnout | | | | |
| Conservative gain from Labour | | Swing | | |

Note: Incumbent Labour councillor Annie Darby stood down at this election.

=== East Marsh ===
East March
| Party | Candidate | Votes | % | ±% |
|---|---|---|---|---|
| Liberal Democrats | Terry Walker | 738 | 53.6 | −14.6 |
| Labour | Mark Gee | 296 | 21.5 | +1.3 |
| UKIP | Phillip Moulson | 264 | 19.2 | +15.6 |
| Conservative | David Townend | 80 | 5.8 | +1.7 |
| Majority | | | | |
| Turnout | | | | |
| Liberal Democrats gain from Labour | | Swing | | |

Note: In the months prior to this election, Walker defected from Labour to the Liberal Democrats.

=== Freshney ===
Freshney
| Party | Candidate | Votes | % | ±% |
|---|---|---|---|---|
| Conservative | Tom Furneaux | 713 | 35.3 | −9.7 |
| Labour | Sheldon Mill | 580 | 28.7 | −11.9 |
| UKIP | Martin Grant | 363 | 18.0 | +8.8 |
| Independent | Mick Kiff | 362 | 17.9 | New |
| Majority | | | | |
| Turnout | | | | |
| Conservative gain from Labour | | Swing | | |

Notes: Changes are compared with the May 2018 local elections, rather than the by-election in July 2018 where Mill had won the seat. Furneaux had previously been a UKIP candidate in Yarborough in 2015, but had stood for the Conservatives before that in Park in 2014.

=== Haverstoe ===
Haverstoe
| Party | Candidate | Votes | % | ±% |
|---|---|---|---|---|
| Conservative | Keith Brookes | 1,962 | 77.8 | +6.7 |
| Labour | Peter Bailey | 559 | 22.2 | −0.1 |
| Majority | | | | |
| Turnout | | | | |
| Conservative hold | | Swing | | |

Notes: Following the retirement of Andrew De Freitas, Brookes is now the only councillor on the authority to have been elected onto it continuously since the inaugural elections in 1995. Bailey is a former Liberal Democrat councillor for Yarborough from 2009 to 2012.

=== Heneage ===
Heneage
| Party | Candidate | Votes | % | ±% |
|---|---|---|---|---|
| Labour | Matthew Patrick | 800 | 41.1 | −7.6 |
| Conservative | Mark Smith | 595 | 30.6 | −2.7 |
| UKIP | John Stockton | 552 | 28.4 | +12.7 |
| Majority | | | | |
| Turnout | | | | |
| Labour hold | | Swing | | |

Notes: Stockton is a former councillor for this ward from 2014 to 2018.

=== Humberston & New Waltham ===
Humberston & New Waltham
| Party | Candidate | Votes | % | ±% |
|---|---|---|---|---|
| Conservative | Stan Shreeve | 2,301 | 82.7 | +1.6 |
| Labour | Sheldon Ellis | 480 | 17.3 | −1.6 |
| Majority | | | | |
| Turnout | | | | |
| Conservative hold | | Swing | | |

=== Immingham ===
Immingham
| Party | Candidate | Votes | % | ±% |
|---|---|---|---|---|
| Conservative | Karen Swinburn | 1,269 | 60.8 | +23.1 |
| Labour | David Bolton | 818 | 39.2 | +1.4 |
| Majority | | | | |
| Turnout | | | | |
| Conservative gain from Labour | | Swing | | |

Note: Swinburn is a former councillor for this ward from 2006 to 2010. She narrowly missed out on gaining this seat the previous year from Bolton, by a mere 3 votes after several recounts.

=== Park ===
Park
| Party | Candidate | Votes | % | ±% |
|---|---|---|---|---|
| Conservative | Debbie Woodward | 1,034 | 37.1 | +2.2 |
| Liberal Democrats | David De Freitas | 781 | 28.0 | +0.8 |
| Labour | Matthew Barrow | 491 | 17.6 | −10.5 |
| UKIP | Anthony Blake | 482 | 17.3 | +12.3 |
| Majority | | | | |
| Turnout | | | | |
| Conservative gain from Liberal Democrats | | Swing | | |

Note: Barrow is a former councillor who represented this ward from 2012 to 2016. De Freitas is the son of incumbent councillor Andrew De Freitas who retired at this election on health grounds.

=== Scartho ===
Scartho
| Party | Candidate | Votes | % | ±% |
|---|---|---|---|---|
| Conservative | Ian Lindley | 1,725 | 58.1 | +3.2 |
| Labour | Liz Haddock | 609 | 20.5 | −7.0 |
| UKIP | Stephen White | 442 | 14.9 | +9.2 |
| Liberal Democrats | Louise Horobin | 193 | 6.5 | −5.4 |
| Majority | | | | |
| Turnout | | | | |
| Conservative hold | | Swing | | |

=== Sidney Sussex ===
Sidney Sussex
| Party | Candidate | Votes | % | ±% |
|---|---|---|---|---|
| Labour | Marie Green | 715 | 40.4 | −12.2 |
| Conservative | Graham Reynolds | 544 | 30.7 | −2.3 |
| UKIP | John Hancock | 512 | 28.9 | +18.8 |
| Majority | | | | |
| Turnout | | | | |
| Labour hold | | Swing | | |

Notes: This was the only ward in the Cleethorpes constituency where UKIP stood a candidate, as well as the only one Labour won. The incumbent, Hazel Chase, had left Labour mid-term and stood down at this election. She endorsed Green in the election.

=== South ===
South
| Party | Candidate | Votes | % | ±% |
|---|---|---|---|---|
| Labour | Janet Goodwin | 532 | 31.2 | −8.5 |
| UKIP | Jane Bramley | 528 | 31.0 | +13.1 |
| Labour | Ian Rodwell | 442 | 25.9 | −13.8 |
| Conservative | Paul Batson | 381 | 22.4 | −0.6 |
| UKIP | Liudmila Berezina | 363 | 21.3 | +3.4 |
| Independent | Deborah Hill | 314 | 18.4 | +4.0 |
| Green | Loyd Emmerson | 232 | 13.6 | +7.6 |
| Independent | Roy Long | 160 | 9.4 | New |
| Majority | | | | |
| Turnout | | | | |
| Labour hold | | Swing | | |
| UKIP gain from Labour | | Swing | | |

Note 1: There was several recounts of the result, because of the closeness between Goodwin and Bramley, which was called by UKIP who given the closeness of the result had hoped Bramley may have overtaken Goodwin for the four year seat. In the end, after conceding, Goodwin won the four year term of office, while Bramley won the one year - which has since been extended due to the cancellation of the 2020 local elections.

Note 2: The Conservatives only fielded one candidate, even though two seats were available. It is unknown as to why this was the case. Batson, their party's candidate, had stood here in the 2016 by-election and 2018 local elections, as well as in 2015 albeit for UKIP.

Note 3: Hill has previously stood here in 2006, 2014 and 2018 as an independent, as well as for the Liberal Democrats (in Sidney Sussex, 2008; and Immingham, 2010) and the Conservatives (in Immingham, 2015; and Yarborough, 2016).

Note 4: Rodwell is husband of Labour councillor for Sidney Sussex ward Debbie Rodwell. He unsuccessfully fought Wolds in 2018.

=== Waltham ===
Waltham
| Party | Candidate | Votes | % | ±% |
|---|---|---|---|---|
| Conservative | Philip Jackson | 1,557 | 85.7 | +2.0 |
| Labour | Vikki Verity | 260 | 14.3 | −2.0 |
| Majority | | | | |
| Turnout | | | | |
| Conservative hold | | Swing | | |

=== West March ===
West March
| Party | Candidate | Votes | % | ±% |
|---|---|---|---|---|
| Labour | Karl Wilson | 410 | 39.0 | −10.6 |
| Independent | Peter Barker | 310 | 29.5 | New |
| UKIP | Adrian Jackson | 212 | 20.2 | −8.3 |
| Conservative | Hugh Riches | 118 | 11.2 | −4.9 |
| Majority | | | | |
| Turnout | | | | |
| Labour hold | | Swing | | |

Note: Barker is a former councillor for this ward from 1999 to 2011. This was the first occasion regular Independent candidate (and other former councillor) for this ward Keith Watkin had not stood here since losing his seat in 2010.

=== Wolds ===
Wolds
| Party | Candidate | Votes | % | ±% |
|---|---|---|---|---|
| Conservative | Henry Hudson | 1,344 | 76.9 | +1.8 |
| Labour | Karl Quibell | 404 | 23.1 | −1.8 |
| Majority | | | | |
| Turnout | | | | |
| Conservative hold | | Swing | | |

Note: Hudson is a former UKIP councillor for Scartho ward who had stood down in 2018. He had previously been a Conservative member and candidate for Freshney in 2008.

=== Yarborough ===
Yarborough
| Party | Candidate | Votes | % | ±% |
|---|---|---|---|---|
| Conservative | Garry Abel | 867 | 45.4 | −1.9 |
| Labour | Peter Wheatley | 622 | 32.6 | −1.5 |
| Socialist Alternative | Kieran Barlow | 421 | 22.0 | New |
| Majority | | | | |
| Turnout | | | | |
| Conservative gain from Labour | | Swing | | |

Note: Barlow had previously stood as a TUSC candidate for this ward in 2018. This was the first occasion UKIP did not field a candidate in the ward since the March 2009 by-election
