= 2021 North East Lincolnshire Council election =

2021 UK local government election

Map showing the results of the 2021 North East Lincolnshire Council election

The 2021 North East Lincolnshire Council election took place on 6 May 2021 to elect members of North East Lincolnshire Council in England. This was on the same day as other local elections. 14 seats were up for election, and the Conservatives retained overall control.

These elections were due to take place in 2020, but were postponed due to the COVID-19 pandemic.

== Results by party ==
North East Lincolnshire Council Election Result 2021
Party	Seats	Gains	Losses	Net gain/loss	Seats %	Votes %	Votes	+/−
Conservative	31	8	0	+8	73.81	60.31	17.341	+31.13
Labour	8	0	-7	-7	19.05	25.55	7,347	-10.11
Liberal Democrats	3	0	1	-1	7.14	5.53	1,590	-5.30
Independent	0	0	0	0	0.00	3.83	1,101	+3.83
TUSC	0	0	0	0	0.00	1.98	569	-1.10
Freedom Alliance	0	0	0	0	0.00	1.75	502	+1.75
UKIP	0	0	0	0	0.00	0.98	282	-17.81
SDP	0	0	0	0	0.00	0.07	21	+0.07

== Council composition ==
Following the last election in 2019, the composition of the council was:

↓
23	15	4
Conservative	Labour	Lib Dem

After the election, the composition of the council was:

↓
31	8	3
Conservative	Labour	Lib Dem

== Ward results ==
=== Croft Baker ===
Croft Baker (1 seat)
Party	Candidate	Votes	%	±%
Conservative	Graham Donald Reynolds	1,083	46.38	+30.28
Labour	Kathryn Helen Wheatley*	723	30.96	−9.54
Liberal Democrats	Roy Horobin	407	17.43	+3.03
Freedom Alliance	Jill Andrea Parkinson	88	3.77	
TUSC	Julian Darren Best	34	1.46	−0.54
Majority		360	15.42	
Turnout		2,335	27.86	
Conservative gain from Labour		Swing		

=== East Marsh ===
East Marsh (2 seats)
Party	Candidate	Votes	%	±%
Liberal Democrats	Kay Rudd (elected to 2024)	788	60.90	
Liberal Democrats	Nicola Dawn Aisthorpe (elected to 2023)	671	51.85	
Labour	Karl Andrew Quibell	211	16.31	
Conservative	Catherine Mary Hogan	195	15.07	
Independent	Lee Coulbeck	159	12.29	
Independent	Billy M Dasein	159	12.29	
Turnout			19.27	
Liberal Democrats hold		Swing		
Liberal Democrats hold		Swing		

Only one seat was due to be contested, however a seat next due up for election in 2023 was also up for election due to a vacancy.

=== Freshney ===
Freshney (1 seat)
Party	Candidate	Votes	%	±%
Conservative	Tanya Brasted	1,105	56.96	+35.46
Labour	Cliff Barber*	758	39.07	−9.83
Freedom Alliance	Timothy John Shaw	41	2.11	
TUSC	Daryl Marc Clifford	36	1.86	+0.26
Majority		347	17.89	
Turnout		1,940	27.10	
Conservative gain from Labour		Swing		

=== Haverstoe ===
Haverstoe (1 seat)
Party	Candidate	Votes	%	±%
Conservative	Bill Parkinson	2,094	71.86	+9.96
Labour	Ian Stuart Rodwell	519	17.81	−3.39
Liberal Democrats	Katie Teakle	247	8.48	−0.02
TUSC	Phil Tuplin	54	1.85	−1.45
Majority		1,575	54.05	+13.35
Turnout		2,914	37.04	
Conservative hold		Swing		

=== Heneage ===
Heneage (1 seat)
Party	Candidate	Votes	%	±%
Conservative	Mark Smith	931	50.08	+32.88
Labour	Emma Louise Clough	734	39.48	−7.92
Liberal Democrats	Adam Driver	73	3.93	−3.97
TUSC	David Bolton	64	3.44	+0.94
Freedom Alliance	Trevor Anthony Francis	57	3.07	
Majority		197	10.60	
Turnout		1,859	23.43	
Conservative gain from Labour		Swing		

=== Humberston and New Waltham ===
Humberston and New Waltham (1 seat)
Party	Candidate	Votes	%	±%
Conservative	Hayden Alexander Dawkins	2,242	76.52	+23.12
Labour	Ian Keith Townsend	553	18.87	+0.17
Freedom Alliance	Warren Peter Jolly	97	3.31	
TUSC	Dave Mitchell	38	1.30	+0.30
Majority		1,689	57.65	+29.25
Turnout		2,930	31.28	
Conservative hold		Swing		

=== Immingham ===
Immingham (1 seat)
Party	Candidate	Votes	%	±%
Conservative	Georgina Erin Astbury	1,144	48.11	+7.91
Labour	David Aaron Watson*	721	30.32	−11.98
Independent	Dan Turner	273	11.48	
Independent	Dave Barton	211	8.87	
TUSC	Nathan Roy Newton	29	1.22	−9.38
Majority		423	17.79	
Turnout		2,378	27.15	
Conservative gain from Labour		Swing		

=== Park ===
Park (1 seat)
Party	Candidate	Votes	%	±%
Conservative	Daniel Wescott	1,444	52.82	+33.62
Labour	Kevin Gregory Shutt	676	24.72	+2.82
Liberal Democrats	David Michael De Freitas	450	16.46	−15.74
TUSC	Angela Heather Greenfield	68	2.49	+1.09
UKIP	Anthony Alan Blake	57	2.08	−18.72
Freedom Alliance	Neil Andrew Lobley	39	1.43	
Majority		768	28.10	
Turnout		2,734	31.35	
Conservative gain from Liberal Democrats		Swing		

=== Scartho ===
Scartho (2 seats)
Party	Candidate	Votes	%	±%
Conservative	Charlotte Leslie Croft (elected until 2024)	1,739	61.36	
Conservative	Ron Shepherd (elected until 2022)	1,578	55.68	
Labour	Robson Augusta	740	26.11	
Independent	Jim Slattery	187	6.60	
TUSC	Val Pow	103	3.63	
UKIP	John Matthew Stockton	99	3.49	
Freedom Alliance	Natalie Louise Woods	88	3.11	
Turnout			32.14	
Conservative hold		Swing		
Conservative hold		Swing		

Only one seat was due to be contested, however a seat next due up for election in 2022 was also up for election due to the resignation of Lia Nici (Conservative).

=== Sidney Sussex ===
Sidney Sussex (1 seat)
Party	Candidate	Votes	%	±%
Conservative	Brian Malcolm Robinson	790	48.73	+34.43
Labour	Gaynor Rogers*	618	38.12	−7.58
Freedom Alliance	Angela Smith	92	5.68	
Liberal Democrats	Les Bonner	74	4.57	−0.23
TUSC	Mark Patrick Gee	47	2.90	−1.00
Majority		172	10.61	
Turnout		1,621	20.20	
Conservative gain from Labour		Swing		

=== South ===
South (1 seat)
Party	Candidate	Votes	%	±%
Conservative	Paul David Batson	628	44.48	+29.68
Labour	Sheldon James Mill	533	37.75	−15.95
UKIP	Jane Elizabeth Bramley	126	8.92	−19.48
Independent	Loyd Layton Emmerson	112	7.93	
TUSC	Val O'Flynn	13	0.92	−2.28
Majority		95	6.73	
Turnout		1,412	16.74	
Conservative gain from Labour		Swing		

=== Yarborough ===
Yarborough (1 seat)
Party	Candidate	Votes	%	±%
Conservative	Martyn Lewis Sandford	1,104	57.71	+36.11
Labour	Edward Thomas Peter Kaczmarek	561	29.32	−18.98
Liberal Democrats	Liam Stephen	144	7.53	
TUSC	Kieran Ian Barlow	83	4.34	+2.44
SDP	Tim Mellors	21	1.10	
Majority		543	28.39	
Turnout		1,913	22.73	
Conservative gain from Labour		Swing		

== By-elections ==
=== Park ===
Park: 17 February 2021
Party	Candidate	Votes	%	±%
Conservative	Marian Boyd	715	38.8	−14.0
Labour	Kevin Shutt	578	31.4	+6.7
Liberal Democrats	Ryan Aisthorpe	478	26.0	+9.5
TUSC	Dave Mitchell	70	3.8	+1.3
Majority		137	7.4	−20.7
Turnout		1,841	21.2	
Conservative hold		Swing	▲10.4	
