= 2012 North East Lincolnshire Council election =

2012 UK local government election

Results by ward.

The 2012 North East Lincolnshire Council election took place on 3 May 2012 to elect members of North East Lincolnshire Council in England. This was on the same day as other 2012 United Kingdom local elections.

== Council make up ==
After the 2012 local election, the political make up of the council was as follows:

Party	Number of councillors
Labour	25
Conservative	12
Liberal Democrats	4
UKIP	1
Green	0
Independent	0

Labour won a majority of the seats on the authority for the first time since the 1999 local elections, making considerable gains from the Liberal Democrats who failed to win a single seat on the council at these elections. Labour gained a seat in Park ward – once seen as the safest Lib Dem ward on the council and only ever won by Lib Dem candidates since the creation of the authority. The Liberal Democrats were also reduced to just four seats – below their previous low point of just 5 seats after the 1999 local elections.

The Conservatives won no wards within the Great Grimsby constituency on the authority – only the second time this had happened in the authority's history, the first being the inaugural elections in 1995. UKIP also won their first seat on the authority in Scartho, a seat that was considered safe for the Conservatives, having won it at every local election since 1999.

UKIP also made considerable progress in many other wards which they would go on to win over the next few years, including Humberston & New Waltham, where at these elections, UKIP came little over 200 votes short of defeating Conservative councillor and Grimsby Town Football Club chairman John Fenty, a seat which UKIP would gain at a by-election in 2013 following the death of Fenty's fellow councillor, John Colebrook, and successfully held this seat when it was next up for election in 2014.

== Ward results ==
=== Croft Baker ===
Croft Baker 2012
Party	Candidate	Votes	%	±%
Labour	Terry Thurogood	1327		
UKIP	Philip Raymond Wilson	448		
Liberal Democrats	Leanor Mary Pidgen	418		
Conservative	Debbie Landymore	364		
Majority		879		
Labour gain from Liberal Democrats		Swing		

=== East Marsh ===
East Marsh 2012
Party	Candidate	Votes	%	±%
Labour	Jon-Paul Howarth	789		
Liberal Democrats	Jeanette Mary McLeod Ferguson	335		
UKIP	Henry Richard Hudson	215		
Conservative	Phillip John Dumbrell	105		
Green	Martin Leslie Reed	61		
Majority		454		
Labour gain from Liberal Democrats		Swing		

Note: Jon-Paul Howarth theoretically holds his seat, as he was elected as a Liberal Democrat when the seat was last fought in 2008, but quit the party to sit as an Independent, and went on to defect to the Labour Party mid-term.

=== Freshney ===
Freshney 2012
Party	Candidate	Votes	%	±%
Labour	Cliff Barber	1043		
Conservative	David Anthony Hasthorpe	332		
UKIP	Stephen Whittingham	332		
Liberal Democrats	Kevin Bakr	112		
Independent	Keith Watkin	87		
Majority		711		
Labour gain from Liberal Democrats		Swing		

Note: Cliff Barber theoretically holds his seat, as he was elected as a Liberal Democrat when the seat was last fought in 2008, but defected to the Labour Party mid-term. Watkin is a former West Marsh councillor from 1999 to 2010.

=== Haverstoe ===
Haverstoe 2012
Party	Candidate	Votes	%	±%
Conservative	Bill Parkinson	1447		
Labour	Rhys Harrison	889		
Liberal Democrats	Roy Horobin	365		
Majority		558		
Conservative hold		Swing		

=== Heneage ===
Heneage 2012
Party	Candidate	Votes	%	±%
Labour	Ros James	1039		
Liberal Democrats	Stephen Hocknell	366		
UKIP	Jamie Stephen Watkinson	304		
Conservative	Karen Lesley Webb-Meek	244		
Independent	Mark Smith	51		
Majority		673		
Labour gain from Liberal Democrats		Swing		

Note: Ros James theoretically holds her seat, as she was elected as a Liberal Democrat when the seat was last fought in 2008, but defected to the Labour Party mid-term. Hocknell is a former councillor who represented the ward from 2003 to 2011.

=== Humberston & New Waltham ===
Humberston & New Waltham 2012
Party	Candidate	Votes	%	±%
Conservative	John Fenty	1231		
UKIP	Stephen William Harness	1001		
Labour	Tim Mickleburgh	596		
Majority		230		
Conservative hold		Swing		

=== Immingham ===
Immingham 2012
Party	Candidate	Votes	%	±%
Labour	David Aaron Watson	1407		
Conservative	Stewart Swinburn	1045		
Majority		362		
Labour gain from Conservative		Swing		

Note: Swinburn is a former councillor who lost his seat the previous year after serving two terms as an Immingham councillor.

=== Park ===
Park 2012
Party	Candidate	Votes	%	±%
Labour	Matthew Craig Barrow	808		
Liberal Democrats	Geoffrey Richard Lowis	696		
Conservative	Bob Callison	655		
UKIP	Timothy John Veal	453		
Green	Jacqueline Vessey	158		
Majority		112		
Labour gain from Liberal Democrats		Swing		

Note: This was the first time that Park had been won by any party other than the Liberal Democrats and to date remains Labour's only victory in the ward in a local election since North East Lincolnshire Council's creation.

=== Scartho ===
Scartho 2012
Party	Candidate	Votes	%	±%
UKIP	Ronald Edward Shepherd	931		
Conservative	Sally Michelle Dixon	718		
Labour	Marian Jervis	630		
Liberal Democrats	Bernardette Chapman	144		
Green	Victoria Anne Dunn	96		
Majority		213		
UKIP gain from Conservative		Swing		

Notes: This was the second occasion (the first being 1995 when Labour won all three seats) that the Conservatives failed to win a council seat in Scartho, and the first time UKIP won a seat on the authority. Dixon previously contested this ward as a Liberal Democrat in 2010 and 2011.

=== South ===
South 2012
Party	Candidate	Votes	%	±%
Labour	Ray Oxby	968		
UKIP	John Matthew Stockton	421		
Liberal Democrats	Ernie Brown	264		
TUSC	Karen Michelle Manley	54		
Majority		547		
Labour gain from Liberal Democrats		Swing		

Note: Ernie Brown previously contested Great Grimsby in the 2010 general election and the Scartho ward in 2011 as an Independent.

=== Sidney Sussex ===
Sidney Sussex 2016
Party	Candidate	Votes	%	±%
Labour	Christopher David Shaw	1098		
UKIP	Scott Owen	329		
Conservative	Richard Hardy	298		
Liberal Democrats	Nicola Dawn Hocknell	169		
Majority		769		
Labour hold		Swing		

=== Yarborough ===
Yarborough 2016
Party	Candidate	Votes	%	±%
Labour	Jane Diana Hyldon-King	1067		
Liberal Democrats	Leslie Bonner	765		
UKIP	James David Cairns	482		
Majority		422		
Labour gain from Liberal Democrats		Swing		

Note: Hyldon-King previously represented Freshney from 1995 to 2003, and again from 2004 to 2008. Bonner previously represented this ward from 2007 to 2011.
