= North East Lincolnshire Council =

Government authority in England

Type
- Type: Unitary authority

History
- Founded: 1 April 1996

Leadership
- Mayor: Marian Boyd, Conservative since 12 May 2026
- Leader: Oliver Freeston, Reform UK since 21 May 2026
- Chief Executive: Sharon Wroot since 1 June 2025

Structure
- Seats: 42 councillors
- Graph of the party split among 42 seats.
- Political groups: Administration (13) Reform (13) Other parties (29) Labour (11) Conservative (10) Liberal Democrats (3) Independent (5)
- Length of term: 4 years
- Salary: £9,144 per annum

Elections
- Voting system: First past the post
- Last election: 7 May 2026
- Next election: May 2027

Meeting place
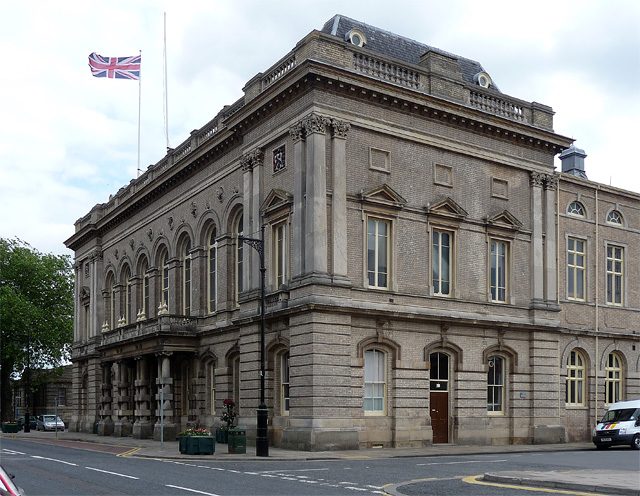
- Town Hall, Town Hall Square, Grimsby, DN31 1HU

Website
- www.nelincs.gov.uk

North East Lincolnshire Council is the local authority of North East Lincolnshire, a local government district in the ceremonial county of Lincolnshire, England. The council is a unitary authority, being a district council which also performs the functions of a county council; it is independent from Lincolnshire County Council.

The council has been under no overall control since May 2024, being run by a Reform minority administration since May 2026. It meets at Grimsby Town Hall and has its main offices in the nearby Municipal Buildings.

== History ==
The district of North East Lincolnshire and its council were created on 1 April 1996. The new district covered the area of two former districts, both of which were abolished at the same time: Cleethorpes and Great Grimsby. Both had been lower-tier districts within the county of Humberside prior to the 1996 reforms, with Humberside County Council providing county-level services to the area. Humberside had only been created in 1974; prior to 1974 this area had been part of Lincolnshire.

The way the 1996 changes were implemented was to create both a non-metropolitan district and a non-metropolitan county called North East Lincolnshire, each covering the combined area of Cleethorpes and Great Grimsby, but with no separate county council. Instead, the district council also performs the functions that legislation assigns to county councils, making it a unitary authority.

At the same time, the new district was transferred for ceremonial purposes back to Lincolnshire, but as a unitary authority the council has always been independent from Lincolnshire County Council. The district was awarded borough status with effect from 23 August 1996, allowing the chair of the council to take the title of mayor.

In 2025 the council became a member of the new Greater Lincolnshire Combined County Authority, along with North Lincolnshire Council and Lincolnshire County Council. The combined authority is chaired by the directly-elected Mayor of Greater Lincolnshire.

== Powers and functions ==
The local authority derives its powers and functions from the Local Government Act 1972 and subsequent legislation. For the purposes of local government, North East Lincolnshire is within a non-metropolitan area of England. As a unitary authority, North East Lincolnshire Council has the powers and functions of both a non-metropolitan county and district council combined. In its capacity as a district council it is a billing authority collecting Council Tax and business rates, it processes local planning applications, it is responsible for housing, waste collection and environmental health. In its capacity as a county council it is a local education authority, responsible for social services, libraries and waste disposal.

In July 2017 it was announced that the Council and the local Clinical Commissioning Group would have a joint chief executive.

== Governance ==
=== Political control ===
The council has been under no overall control since the 2024 election, being led by a Reform minority administration since May 2026.

The first election to the council was held in 1995, initially operating as a shadow authority alongside the outgoing authorities until the new arrangements came into effect 1 April 1996. Political control of the council since 1996 has been as follows:

Party in control	Years
Labour	1996–2003
No overall control	2003–2012
Labour	2012–2014
No overall control	2014–2019
Conservative	2019–2024
No overall control	2024–present

=== Leadership ===
The role of mayor is largely ceremonial in North East Lincolnshire. Political leadership is instead provided by the leader of the council. The leaders since the council's creation in 1996 have been:

Councillor	Party	From	To
Muriel Barker	Labour	1 Apr 1996	May 1999
Len Taylor	Labour	May 1999	May 2003
Keith Brookes	Conservative	22 May 2003	Jun 2004
Andrew De Freitas	Liberal Democrats	24 Jun 2004	May 2005
Keith Brookes	Conservative	May 2005	2006
Andrew De Freitas	Liberal Democrats	2006	2011
Chris Shaw	Labour	26 May 2011	May 2015
Ray Oxby	Labour	May 2015	11 Mar 2019
Philip Jackson	Conservative	21 May 2019	May 2026
Oliver Freeston	Reform	21 May 2026	

=== Composition ===
Following the 2026 election, and a subsequent change of allegiance in August 2026, the composition of the council was as follows:

Party	Seats
Reform	13
Labour	11
Conservative	10
Liberal Democrats	3
Independent	5
Total	42

Four of the five independent councillors sit together as the "Independents for North East Lincolnshire" group, and the other does not belong to a group. The next election is due in May 2027.

== Cabinet ==
Party key	Reform	Conservative	Labour

Post	Party	Councillor	Ward
Mayor and Deputy Mayor
Mayor	Conservative	Marian Boyd	Park
Deputy Mayor	Labour	Robson Augusta	Park
Leader and Deputy Leader
Leader of the Council Portfolio Holder for Strategic Renewal, Delivery and Place Leadership	Reform	Oliver Freeston	Croft Baker
Deputy Leader Portfolio Holder for Children and Education	Reform	Samuel Grice	Haverstoe
Cabinet members
Portfolio Holder for Health, Wellbeing and Adult Social Care	Reform	Nigel Oliver	Park
Portfolio Holder for Finance, Resources and Assets	Reform	Simon Taylor	Humberston and New Waltham
Portfolio Holder for Waste, Recycling and Energy	Reform	Darren Mayne	Wolds
Portfolio Holder for Housing, Infrastructure and Transport	Reform	Paul Batson	South
Portfolio Holder for Safer and Stronger Communities	Reform	James Sawkins	Waltham
Portfolio Holder for Environment, Tourism and Culture	Reform	Bob Callison	Sidney Sussex

== Premises ==
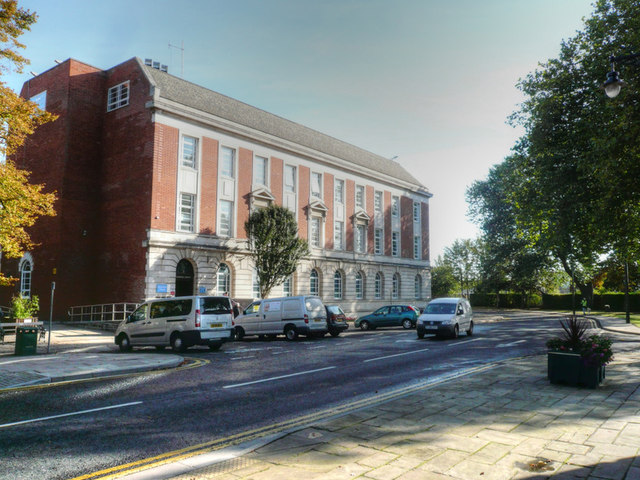
Council's main offices: Municipal Buildings, Town Hall Square, Grimsby, DN31 1HU

Council meetings are held at Grimsby Town Hall, which had been built in 1863 for the old borough council of Great Grimsby. The council's main offices are in the Municipal Buildings opposite the town hall, which had been completed in 1941.

== Elections ==
Since the last boundary changes in 2003 the council has comprised 42 councillors representing 15 wards, with each ward electing two or three councillors. Elections are held three years out of every four, with roughly a third of the council elected each time for a four-year term of office.

=== Wards ===
The wards are:

- Croft Baker
- East Marsh
- Freshney
- Haverstoe
- Heneage
- Humberston and New Waltham
- Immingham
- Park
- Scartho
- Sidney Sussex
- South
- Waltham
- West Marsh
- Wolds
- Yarborough

=== Wider politics ===
The borough straddles the parliamentary constituencies of Great Grimsby and Cleethorpes and Brigg and Immingham.
