= Humberston (disambiguation) =

Humberston is a village in the English county of Lincolnshire.

Humberston may also refer to:

- Clara E. Speight-Humberston (1862–1936), Canadian researcher
- Humberston Abbey, abbey in Humberston, Lincolnshire, England
- Humberston Academy, academy in Humberston, Grimsby, North East Lincolnshire, England
- Humberston Fitties, holiday resort in Lincolnshire, England
- Humberston Wright (1876–1953), British film actor
- Philip Stapleton Humberston (1812–1891), British politician
- Thomas Frederick Mackenzie Humberston (1753–1783), British Army officer
