= Lincolnshire Coast Light Railway =

Heritage railway in Skegness, Lincolnshire

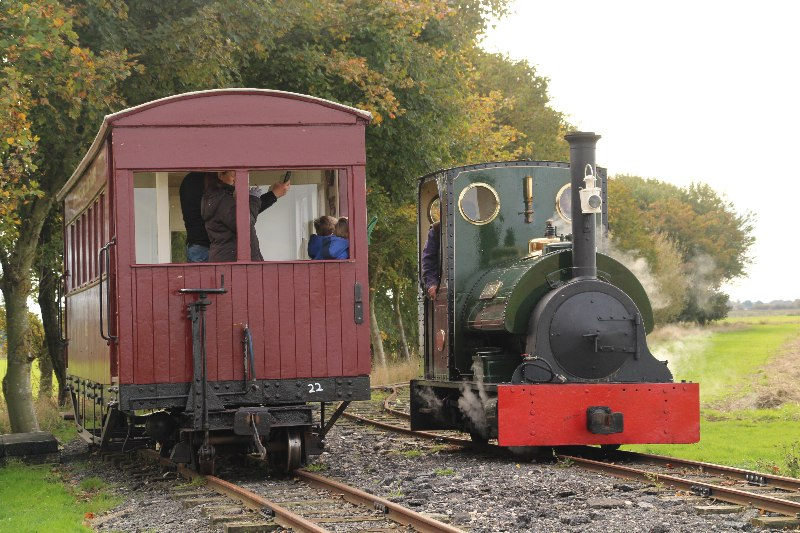
- Lincolnshire Coast Light Railway in 2021
- Locale: England
- Coordinates: 53.179°N 0.333°E

Commercial operations
- Original gauge: 2 ft (610 mm)

Preserved operations
- Stations: 2
- Preserved gauge: 2 ft (610 mm)

Commercial history
- Opened: 27 August 1960
- 1966: New alignment
- Closed: 1985 (Abandoned)
- 2009: Reopened at Skegness Water Park

The Lincolnshire Coast Light Railway is a 2 ft (610 mm) narrow gauge heritage railway in Skegness. It has previously been located on two other sites, originally as an industrial (farm) railway, and later as a heritage line near Cleethorpes. Since 2009 it has operated in the village of Ingoldmells, north of Skegness, and it is open to the public on advertised operating days.

== History ==
=== Nocton Estate Light Railway ===
The railway's origins lie in the Nocton Estate Light Railway, one of the largest of several Lincolnshire potato railways which operated an industrial rail network across Lincolnshire farms throughout much of the twentieth century. The Nocton network alone extended to over 30 miles of track. After the Second World War the farm began introducing tractors, and by 1960 parts of the railway were abandoned. The remaining parts of the line closed in 1969.

=== Cleethorpes ===
Parts of the potato farm equipment, including both track and rolling stock, were acquired by railway enthusiasts, who constructed the Lincolnshire Coast Light Railway as a tourist attraction on land leased from Grimsby Rural District at Humberston, near Cleethorpes. Construction began in April 1960, and the railway opened on 27 August 1960. The first services used a Motor Rail "Simplex" locomotive and a single open bogie carriage converted from a wagon. The line was the first heritage railway in the world to be built on a greenfield site and ran from the bus terminus in Humberston to the beach and Humberston Fitties holiday camp.

In 1961, a second Motor Rail locomotive was added, and the railway's first steam locomotive Jurassic arrived. Additional equipment in the form of a passenger coach from the Sand Hutton Light Railway (closed to passengers in 1930) and two vehicles that had formerly run on the Ashover Light Railway were brought to the railway and restored, entering service in 1967 and 1962-3 respectively. Midweek carryings were adversely affected by the 1962 extension of Grimsby-Cleethorpes Transport bus service to serve the Fitties holiday camp, but weekend and Bank Holiday traffic remained strong, and by 1964 the line was carrying 60,000 passengers a year.

In 1966 the railway was rebuilt on a new alignment and extended. The line saw considerable success in the late 1960s, and another steam locomotive, Elin, arrived, although it proved too heavy for the lightly laid track. The line operated push–pull trains for many years, but an accident resulted in the Railway Inspectorate requiring the installation of run-round loops, so that the locomotive would always be at the head of the train, as well as air brakes.

The railway also became home to a number of ex-Great Northern Railway items including the somersault signals used to control movements at North Sea Lane station, railings, and other platform furniture from stations on the East Lincolnshire Railway many of whose minor stations were closed in 1963.

In the early 1980s, the railway carried heavy passenger traffic to and from a large car boot sale held at the Fitties holiday camp on Sundays. Traffic was so heavy that at times all three covered carriages were in use simultaneously. However, midweek traffic outside of the brief summer season had dwindled to almost nothing. Other issues arose that made it impractical to continue on the Humberston site. Firstly, the 1984 miners' strike considerably reduced the number of holiday makers using the Fitties holiday camp, further decreasing traffic on the line. Also, as a condition of renewing the lease on the site, the council insisted on the installation of 6-foot-high (1.8 m) fences on both sides of the railway, which would have created an unpleasant cage-like environment for passengers using the railway's low-slung coaches. In 1985, faced with a series of obstacles, the railway closed at the end of the summer season in September, and the track was lifted shortly afterwards.

When the line closed at the end of its 1985 season, Jurassic still had a valid boiler ticket, so it was taken to the Leighton Buzzard Light Railway to run at their 1986 gala, The LCLR-owned rolling stock, rails and equipment went into storage on land adjacent to the site of the former Burgh-le-Marsh railway station.

=== Historic Vehicles Trust ===
The Lincolnshire Coast Light Railway Historic Vehicles Trust was formed in 1983 to restore and preserve some of the ex-Nocton War Department Light Railways rolling stock which was not required by the railway. Some vehicles were lent to the Museum of Army Transport at Beverley, until that ran into financial difficulties in the mid-1990s. The trust's stock was moved to a private site until it was re-united with the rest of the railway at the Water Leisure Park.

=== Skegness ===
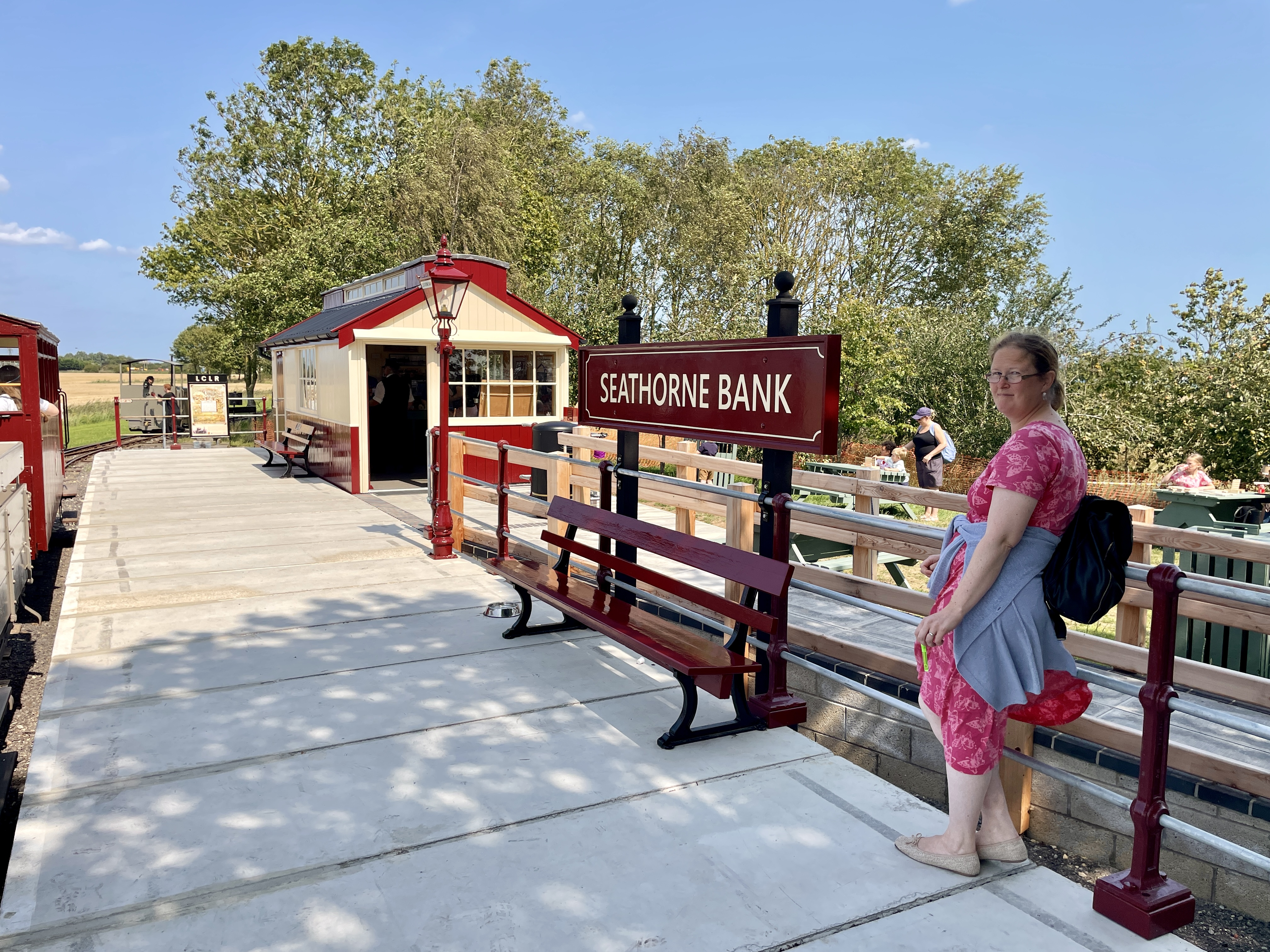
Seathorne Bank railway station at the southern end of the line.

In 1992 the LCLR was offered a new home at the Skegness Water Leisure Park, then under development. A new line was constructed there which finally opened on 3 May 2009. The railway's existing equipment had been in storage until that point.

In 2014, a bid was made by the trust to re-build the open coach, converted in 1962 from one of the ex Nocton Class D wagons, into a disabled-friendly passenger vehicle. After winning a vote in the 'Peoples Millions' competition run by ITV, the Trust was awarded £43,400 to do the work, and the project was completed by the end of 2015. The 'D' class bogie wagon has been returned to its original appearance, apart from the addition of a safety rail above the sides and ends of the vehicle and the inclusion of a small door in one of the drop sides of the wagon for the loading and unloading of passengers and wheelchairs. Seating is provided in the form of boxes resembling World War I ammunition boxes secured around the sides of the vehicle. The platform at Wall's Lane (former Lakeview) station has been extended and upgraded to accommodate a two-coach train and provide disabled access to the trains. A water tank has been installed to cater for the return of Jurassic to traffic.

The Trust restored the Peckett Jurassic with a "Back to Steam" appeal, with the locomotive tested "in steam" (minus air brakes) in August 2017. It entered service, fully equipped with air brakes, in September 2017.

On the 28 June 2025 the railway's second station was opened at Seathorne Bank, by the Mayor of Skegness, Cllr. Jimmy Brookes, allowing passengers to board and alight from trains at both ends of their journey.

== Route ==
The railway operates around two sides of Skegness Airfield, a grass-runway airport on the edge of the Skegness Water Leisure Park. There is a car parking area near to the original station, now named Walls Lane, which is equipped with a single platform, a booking office, and a waiting room. After passing the airport hangars a siding continues ahead towards the railway's main depot and engineering works, whilst the main running line turns quite sharply south and runs between the airport and open fields until reaching the second station at Seathorne Bank. This station has a single platform, and a large station building containing staff accommodation, a shop, and a light refreshments counter. There are run-round loops at both stations.

== Locomotives ==
The railway has operated or stored a number of heritage steam and diesel locomotives, and these are listed in the following table. Those highlighted in green are currently part of the locomotive fleet. Those highlighted in red are no longer part of the fleet. Additionally, a small number of privately-owned locomotives are also kept on site, with permission.

LCLR No	Name	Builder	Type	Year built	Works number	Notes
1	Paul	Motor Rail	4wDM	1926	3995	ex-Nocton Estate Light Railway Nocton No 5
2	Jurassic	Peckett & Sons	0-6-0ST	1903	1008	ex-Southam Limeworks
3	Southam	Ruston & Hornsby	4wDM	1933	168437	ex-Southam Limeworks, scrapped in 1968
4	Wilton	Motor Rail	4wDM	1940	7481	ex-Humberston Brickworks
5	Major J A Robins RE	Motor Rail	4wDM	1944	8874	
6	Gricer	Motor Rail	4wDM	1941	8622	
7	Nocton	Motor Rail	4wDM	1920	1935	ex-Nocton Estate Light Railway
8	Fred	Motor Rail	4wDM	1947	9264	Ex-Skegness brickworks
9	Sark	Motor Rail	4wDM	1943	8825	Ex-Bolton Fell peat railway
Locomotives stored on site, but unused
	Elin	Hunslet	0-4-0ST	1899	705	Ex-Penrhyn Quarry. In the collection from the late 1960s, but deemed too heavy for the line. Unused, it was sold to the Yaxham Light Railway in 1986, and later moved to a private railway in Kent.
	Peter	W.G. Bagnall	0-4-0ST	1917	2067	Ex-Cliffe Hill Mineral Railway. It was briefly at the LCLR in the early 1960s, but unused, and not in working order. It moved to the Brockham Railway Museum, and then the Amberley Museum Railway.

== Gallery ==
Locomotive Jurassic running round its train, at Seathorne Bank in 2024

.
