= Rod Fletcher =

English footballer (1945–2023)

Personal information
- Full name: James Rodney Fletcher
- Date of birth: 23 September 1945
- Place of birth: Preston, England
- Date of death: 24 November 2023 (aged 78)
- Place of death: Grimsby, England
- Height: 5 ft 8 in (1.73 m)
- Position: Centre forward

Senior career*
Years	Team	Apps	(Gls)
196?–1962	Nelson		
1962–1964	Leeds United	0	(0)
1964–1966	Madeley College		
1966–1967	Crewe Alexandra	1	(0)
1967–1971	Lincoln City	90	(29)
1971–1973	Scunthorpe United	98	(30)
1973–1975	Grimsby Town	12	(1)
1975-1977	Immingham Town		
- Louth United

Managerial career
- 1975-1977: Immingham Town
- * Club domestic league appearances and goals

James Rodney Fletcher (23 September 1945 – 24 November 2023) was an English professional footballer who scored 60 goals from 201 games in the Football League playing as a centre forward for Crewe Alexandra, Lincoln City, Scunthorpe United and Grimsby Town.

== Career ==
Fletcher was born on 23 September 1945 in Preston, Lancashire. He played for Nelson in the Lancashire Combination before turning professional with Leeds United in 1962. After two years playing for Leeds' junior teams he began a teacher training course, and in his final year played for Crewe Alexandra where he made his debut in the Football League. Fletcher signed on a part-time basis for Lincoln City while working in his first teaching post in nearby Grimsby. He scored regularly for the reserves but only established himself in the first team towards the end of the 1968–69 season. The following year he was the club's top scorer with 17 goals in all competitions and played in every game.

When managerial changes left Fletcher out of favour, he joined Scunthorpe United in 1971 for a £3,000 fee, to replace Kevin Keegan who had joined Liverpool. Still combining his football and teaching careers, Fletcher was ever-present in the 1971–72 season. His 19 goals helped Scunthorpe to the Third Division title and made him the club's leading scorer, a feat he repeated the following season, though with only 10 goals as they were relegated. He finished his professional career with two injury-hit seasons at Grimsby Town before being released on a free transfer. In May 1975, he was appointed player-manager for Immingham Town agreeing a two-year contract. He resigned from the post in June 1977 due to increased work commitments from a new job as PE Master at the newly opened Humberston Comprehensive School and later played for Louth United.

== Death ==
Fletcher died on 24 November 2023 and a celebration of his life was held on 13 December 2023. He was 78.
