= Lincolnshire potato railways =

Railway network in Lincolnshire, England

Coordinates: 53.153500°N 0.419271°W

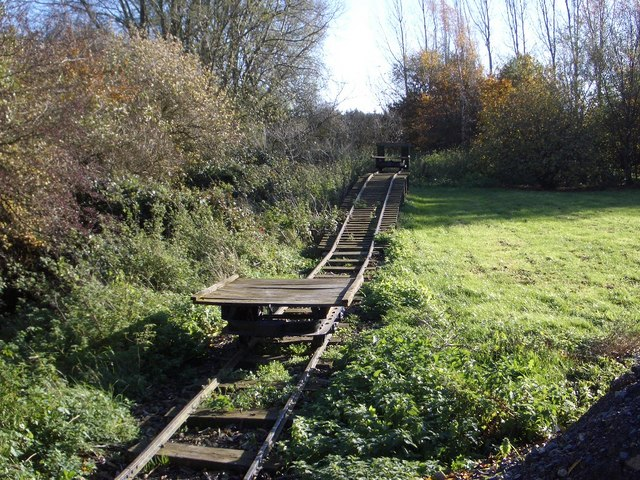
Example Potato Railway at Vine House Farm, Deeping St Nicholas

The Lincolnshire potato railways were a network of private, 1 ft 11 1/2 in (597 mm) narrow gauge farm railways which existed in the English county of Lincolnshire in the mid-20th century, for the purposes of transporting the annual potato crop between the fields and the nearest standard-gauge main line railhead.

== Major systems ==
There were two major systems of potato railways: one located near the village of Nocton (the "Nocton Estate Light Railway" south of Lincoln), centred on Nocton and Dunston railway station; the other to the north of Holbeach in the south of the county, serving Fleet and Sutton Bridge stations. There were other, smaller systems elsewhere in Lincolnshire, for example at Deeping St Nicholas.

== Closure ==
All of the potato railways were closed by 1969; their duties taken over by farm lorries. Some of the rolling stock and track from the Nocton system have been preserved at the Lincolnshire Coast Light Railway near Skegness.
