= Cleethorpes Country Park =

Nature reserve in Lincolnshire, England

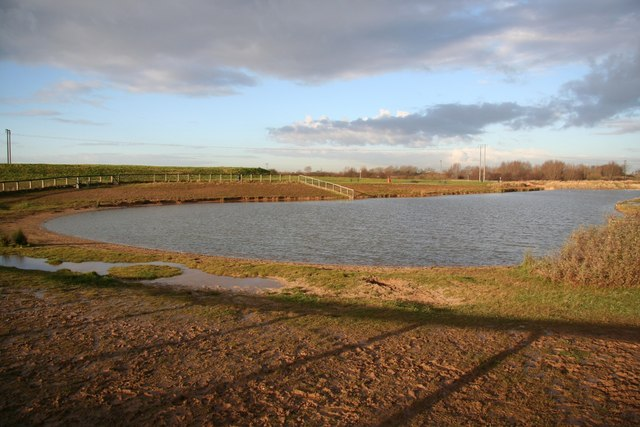
- The lake at Cleethorpes Country Park
- Interactive map of Cleethorpes Country Park
- Type: Local Nature Reserve
- Location: Between Cleethorpes and Humberston, North East Lincolnshire
- OS grid: TA 306 067
- Area: 0.62 hectares (1.5 acres)
- Manager: North East Lincolnshire Council

Cleethorpes Country Park is a 62.01 hectares (0.6201 km^{2}) Local Nature Reserve situated between the town of Cleethorpes and the village of Humberston in North East Lincolnshire. It is owned and managed by North East Lincolnshire Council. It is composed of woodland, grassland and a lake. The site is a good habitat for wildflowers, invertebrates, wildfowl and skylarks. Over winter, wading birds roost on the park at high tide. The LNR is bounded to the north by Cleethorpes (demarcated by Buck Beck), and forms the northern boundary of Humberston's residential area; it is bounded to the west by the A1031 road and to the east by Cleethorpes Golf Club.
