= Humberston Fitties =

Holiday resort in Lincolnshire, England

Coordinates: 53.5296°N 0.0108°E

Humberston Fitties Chalet Park
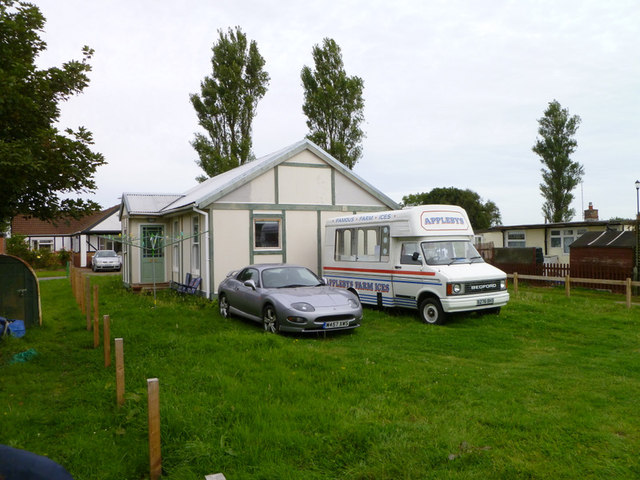

- Location within Lincolnshire
- OS grid reference: TA3305
  - London: 140 mi (230 km) S
- Civil parish: Humberston
- Unitary authority: North East Lincolnshire
- Ceremonial county: Lincolnshire
- Region: Yorkshire and the Humber
- Country: England
- Sovereign state: United Kingdom
- Post town: GRIMSBY
- Postcode district: DN36 4HA
- Police: Humberside
- Fire: Humberside
- Ambulance: East Midlands
- UK Parliament: Brigg and Immingham

The Humberston Fitties (officially named the Humberston Fitties Chalet Park and known locally as The Fitties) is a holiday resort that began as an inter-war plotland in the civil parish of Humberston, in the North East Lincolnshire district, in the ceremonial county of Lincolnshire, England.

Since the 1920s it has evolved to a resort of around 330 chalets and bungalows. The Fitties' lagoon is a Site of Special Scientific Interest. In 2007 the Fitties were featured in the first ever "Quality Coast Awards" (now called "Seaside Awards") for "Best Places to Go for Coastal Isolation" and in 2017 they were declared a conservation area.

== The name ==
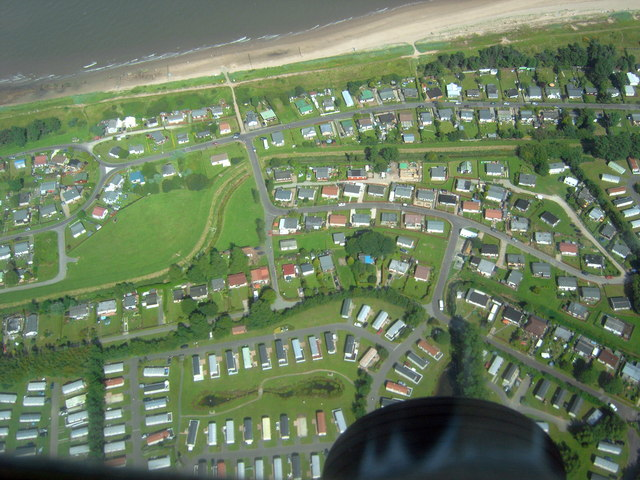
Humberston Fitties aerial view, 2007

The term "fitties" developed from the anglicisation of the Norse fitjar meaning "foreshore saltings" or "waterside grassland". 'Fitties' can be found in several places along the Lincolnshire coastline, including the 'North Cotes Fitties' and the 'Tetney Fitties'.

In 1960 the Grimsby Rural District Council considered "the word 'fitties' unattractive [and] tried to change the name". An alternative suggestion was the "Humberston Dunes Holiday Camp", but the idea came to nothing, and the name remained unchanged. In the early 20th century the area was known variously as the "Humberston Lido", the "Great Bear Camp" and "Halle Sands". It is currently the "Humberston Fitties Chalet Park."

== Regulations ==
To retain the Fitties' status as a camp, it operates a strictly enforced 10-month year: "All chalets must be vacated from four in the afternoon to 9.30 the next morning throughout January and February." This rule helps the Fitties to maintain the "impermanent spirit" that developed in the early days.

== Geography and biodiversity ==
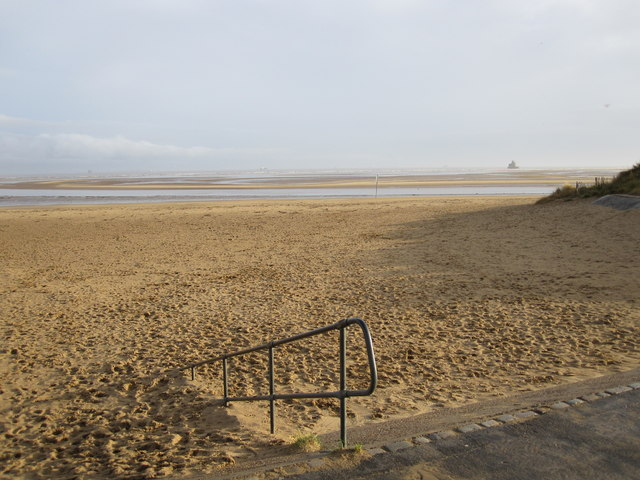
The beach at Anthony's Bank

In the 17th century the area was "well wooded". The coastline was created by enclosing Anthony's Bank (now Marine Walk car park) in 1795. Within 40 years sand dunes had formed, which would eventually become the site for the first bungalows on the Fitties.

In 1986 the lagoon, comprising one main lagoon and four saltmarsh pools, was considered the most important lagoon in South Humberside. It is the most northerly site in England for the sand shrimp Gammarus insensibilis. The lagoon is managed by the Royal Society for the Protection of Birds and has been described as "the third most important saline lagoon in Britain".

In 1988, the Fitties' flats and marshes were designated a Site of Special Scientific Interest on account of their "wealth of rare birds" including "sanderling, knot, grey plover, ringed plover, dunlin, curlew, redshank, turnstone and shelduck."

== Modern history ==
=== 1900 to 1914 ===
In 1900, the area that was to become the Fitties was used by Victorians for the popular new pastime of camping. In 1901, the Parliamentary Committee of the Cleethorpes Urban Council discussed turning part of the land into a 'recreational facility', potentially as an extension of the golf links. The land's owner at the time, Earl Carrington, was in favour of the proposal. A new golf course opened in 1908, with Earl Carrington leasing the land to Grimsby and Cleethorpes Golf Club for 99 years. By 1910, "The Camping Club" and the "Grimsby Rifle Club" were also renting land from the earl.

=== World War I ===
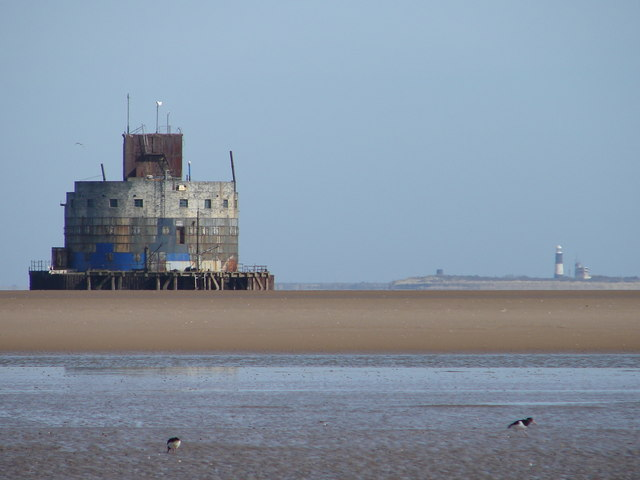
Haile Sand Fort and Spurn Head

During WWI, the Fitties' dunes were used by the army to build billets for soldiers stationed at the nearby Haile Sands Fort, from where anti-submarine chains with steel netting stretched to the south-east end of the coastline.

In August 1914, the 3rd Battalion of the Manchester Regiment was stationed at the Fitties, training recruits, rehabilitating injured soldiers and guarding the coastline between Cleethorpes and Tetney Lock. In 1915, a picket – a small unit of soldiers, placed on a defensive line forward of a friendly position to provide timely warning of enemy approach – was located there. Between 1916 and 1918, men from H Company were billeted there.

=== 1918 to 1940s ===
After WWI, when many soldiers left the army, families moved into disused army huts, followed by holiday makers who stayed in "caravans, buses and railway carriages". In 1920 Earl Carrington sold his Humberston estate, including the Fitties. In 1921 several bungalows on the Fitties were washed away after an "abnormal tide".

In 1925 residents of the former army huts, together with residents of makeshift homes, formed the Humberston Fitties Campers' Association. In 1938, Grimsby Rural District Council bought 330 acres of land in the Fitties from C F Crow (who had bought it from the Marquis of Lincolnshire) to create a "first class camping ground, which will attract people to the area", including those from the Midlands who "do not have access to the sea."

=== 1940s and 1950s ===
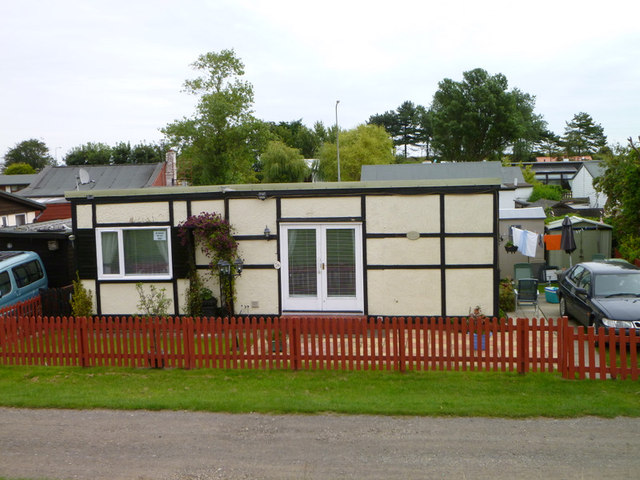
A typical chalet at the Humberston Fitties

During WWII 100 acres of the Fitties, which had "laid idle for goodness knows how many years", was used for potato production.

After WWII, a new layout and drainage system was put in place, together with shops and entertainment – including a mobile fish and chip van, ice-cream van, donkey rides and the taking of "walkie pictures" (more commonly known as 'walking pictures', commercial photographers would take photographs of people in the street, hand them a card inviting them to a kiosk later in the day to buy a souvenir photo).

By 1947 there were about 60 huts and bungalows at the Fitties and 240 more were added over the next nine years. The Fitties became, as described, a popular holiday destination, with a bungalow being a considerably cheaper option than a hotel or boarding house. As many as 6,000 people could be accommodated.

In 1950, the Fitties were referred to as "Bungalow Town". The local council fenced off the private property to prevent visitors from trespassing. In 1952, in an effort to improve local conditions, 50 "structures", including converted buses and trams, were removed from the area.

A storm surge in 1953 caused the dunes to be breached by the sea, after which remedial action was taken to protect them, including "brush-wood kidding, fencing and marram grass planting." In 1956 more than £6,000 was spent on erosion prevention.

In 1958, because of the high risk of flooding, the Fitties was deemed a "potentially dangerous area" by the Department of Scientific and Industrial Research. Suggestions to improve safety included creating a "perfect flood warning system", the construction of a sea wall and more groynes and planting of 2,000 Corsican and Scotch pines to "bind the soil". Work was never started, for reasons of cost, and instead the council "agreed that people wishing to rent plots on the Fitties should be told of the risk."

In the same year, "picturesque water pumps" were replaced by taps, a recommendation was made that roads be given names and bungalows numbers and 1,300 caravans were added to the 120 acres of land behind the dunes, creating further erosion.

=== 1960s ===
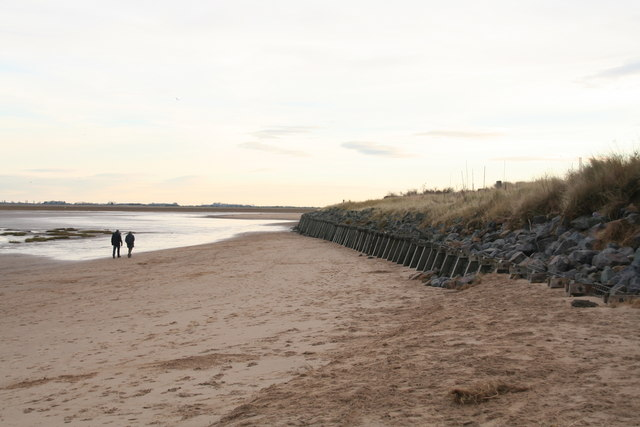
Sea defences at the beach

In 1960, a doctor's surgery, a grocer's shop, a general store and a café with a fish and chip shop were built. £19,000 was spent on more sea defences, including a "low wall of slag over clay, with an asphalt walk on top" together with the purchase of a lifeboat and a loud-hailer. An additional safety measure was the installation of telegraph poles with a "bosun's chair" on the off-shore sandbanks. The idea was copied from Marshchapel in the hope it would “solve for ever” the danger of people drowning as they got cut off by the rising tide.

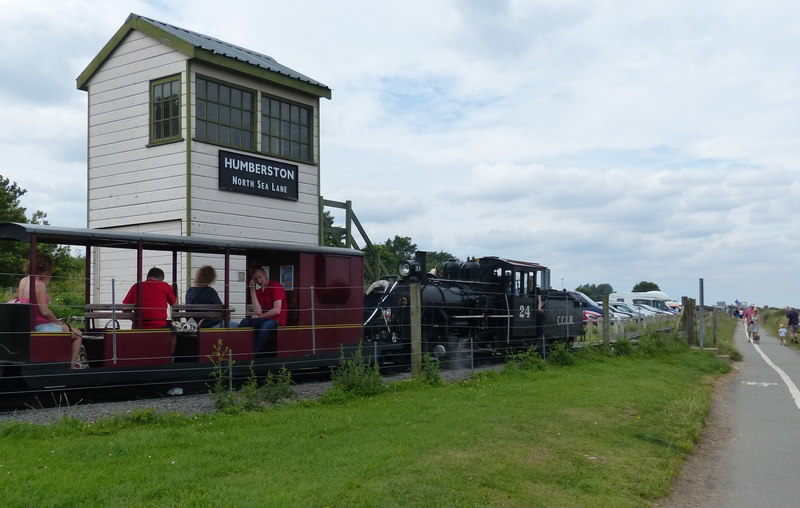
Humberston North Sea train line

In 1960 the Lincolnshire Coast Light Railway opened a 2-ft narrow-gauge line, comprising 600 metres of track leased from Grimsby Rural District Council. "Britain's shortest public passenger-carrying railway" was operated by volunteers and ran between North Sea Lane and South Sea Lane stations offering a daily service during the summer months. The tracks were bought from the potato-fields railway at Nocton, Lincolnshire.

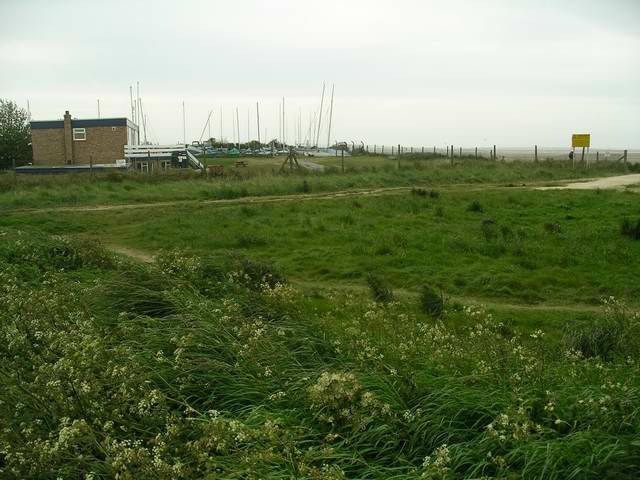
Humber Mouth Yacht Club

In 1961, the Humber Mouth Yacht Club opened at Tetney Haven.

In the same year, the dunes were found to have been eroded by two thirds of their length by strong waves. Around 260 tonnes of broken concrete and slag was used to shore up the weakest points and suggestions were made to further increase its stability, including building a higher and deeper sea wall between the dunes and the camp site, together with a clay bank on the beach. Between 1961 and 1964 gabions and groynes costing £18,000 were built but within two years sand was scoured from the beach and the contents of the groynes washed out.

In 1961, 20 more acres were added to the Fitties, reflecting its growing popularity. It was at this time that the residents established a first aid post because of "the number of untreated or inadequately treated accidents, mostly to children". In the same year the area was declared part of a coastal conservation area.

In 1962, approval was given to improve local sewage works provision. Caravans were replaced by a "chalet type of dwelling", which was a "welcome improvement". In the same year permission was given for a clubhouse, the ‘’Foreshore Inn’’, to be built on the site of a former gun emplacement.

In 1963, another 21 acres were developed to accommodate 400 caravans, and the Humber Mouth Yacht Club (HMYC) opened a clubhouse. The following year, the HMYC became affiliated with the Royal Yachting Association.

In 1965, the Royal Life-Boat Institution provided a Zodiac "inshore rescue boat" for a one-year trial. In the first year it saved the lives of 215 people. In the summer of 1967, a bus service to the Fitties from Cleethorpes via the zoo was opened. During August it transported more than 67,000 passengers.

In 1968, the area south of the Dutch Wall (which runs parallel to the lagoon) was developed because of erosion of the sand dunes, and discussions began about restricting access of vehicles to the dunes. In the same year the idea of creating a nature reserve on a former gravel pit was suggested. In 1969, 80 acres west of Anthony's Bank were added to the Fitties.

=== 1970s ===
In 1970, the Lincolnshire Light Railway celebrated its tenth anniversary. It was estimated that during its short life it had carried half a million people between the Fitties and North Sea Lane. A report commissioned in 1972 said of the Fitties, "Half-hearted commercial development has spoiled the natural area… Excessive vehicular and pedestrian pressure has caused considerable erosion."

In 1973, the Fitties received a replacement lifeboat, which was called out "within hours of being taken into service" to rescue three children cut off by the tide. In the same year a proposal was submitted to create a "marina type development" costing £1,500,000. Nothing came of this.

=== 1980s ===
In 1980, the Cleethorpes Council of Churches provided holidays in the Humberston Fitties for Vietnamese refugees who had arrived in England in late 1979. A Humberston Lifeguard Pavilion was also opened.

In 1982, to reduce erosion from pedestrians, fencing and special grasses were added along a 760-metre stretch of the dunes.

In 1986, Lord Delfont's "First Leisure Corporation", that owned Blackpool Tower, was in discussion with Cleethorpes Borough Council to buy the Humberston Fitties for £6 million. The proposal was met by protests from chalet owners, with one issue being that the council hadn't offered them first refusal to buy their properties freehold. Negotiations ceased in March 1987 and the council retained ownership of the Fitties. In August 1987, Cleethorpes Borough Council announced plans to make the Humberston Fitties "Europe’s most up-to-date caravan park" for 1,200 caravans with cable TV, computer and telephone lines for every unit. In December 1989, Whitegate Leisure made a proposal to “transform Humberston Fitties into an up-market holiday village for the 1990s” to be renamed "South Beach Holiday Village". The plans included supermarkets, fast food outlets, a cabaret room, nightclub and fitness centre. The plans were rejected in 1991.

=== 1990s onwards ===
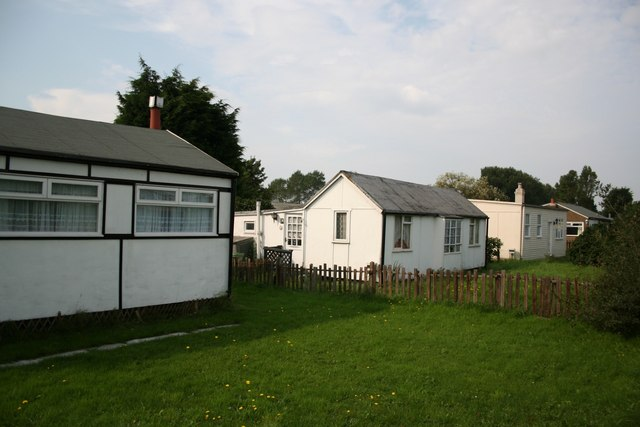
Chalets at the Humberston Fitties

In August 1991, Cleethorpes Council received proposals from multiple companies applying to develop the Fitties. In October it was announced that Bourne Leisure had won the bid, which included a nine-hole golf course, tennis courts, bowling green and indoor swimming pool and "eventually" 200 caravans. The contract was signed in January 1992, giving Cleethorpes Borough Council £350,000 a year. The site's name changed to "Thorpe Park" and a heated outdoor swimming pool was built.

In May 1992, "Caravan Watch" was launched, operating on the same system as the UK's Neighbourhood Watch.

By 1993, the Fitties' long beach became the site's biggest development, including new "fully-serviced pitches, tarmac roads, street lighting, electricity, water and cables for television and satellite", together with 7,000 trees. In September 1993, plans to bring electricity to the rest of the 2,000 established pitches were put on hold; at this point older pitches were still using "gas, candles, batteries or their own generators."

In October 1993, the Royal Society for the Protection of Birds created "Humber International Birdwatch"in a large marquee located at Anthony's Bank carpark, including displays from 12 environmental organisations, including Birds of the Humber Trust and Lincolnshire Bird Club.

By 1994, Bourne Leisure had installed a bowling green and several children's play areas and entertainment centres. In November, the company proposed that it take over the older development. This was rejected by Cleethorpes Borough Council.

In November 1995, 800 chalet owners signed a petition to create the "Fitties Conservation Area" through the creation of the "Fitties Preservation Society". The council launched a report which would "take a toothcomb over the site and its heritage, define what is a typical Fitties home… and look at what a conservation order can do to preserve the area's character." There was growing concern that, with an upcoming change to the County Council's structure, the new "Grimsby-based councillors [would not] appreciate what the Fitties were about."

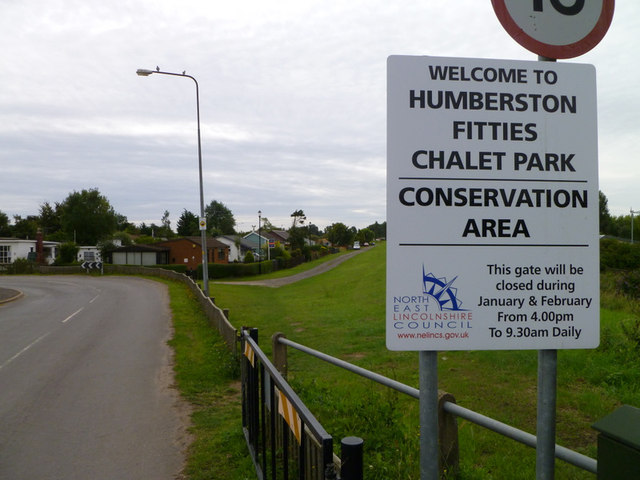
Humberston Fitties conservation area

In March 1996, with support from the Twentieth Century Society, the Fitties was confirmed as a conservation area to preserve the 27-hectare site. Of this status, it was said that, "though the Fitties did not have the elements usually associated with a conversation area, it had a special character and historic interest worth preserving." In 1998, in order to further protect the Fitties, the council passed an Article 4 direction allowing authorities greater control over the area.

After a "50-year crusade for plug power", the original 330 chalets were connected to three new electric substations in May 1999. The chalet owners petitioned the North Lincolnshire Council to be able to fence their properties.

In 2000, the Fitties was described as "a fascinating maze of unique wooden huts and bungalows, all with a distinctly maritime flavour and each one immaculately maintained."

In 2016 North East Lincolnshire Council offered the Fitties for sale. A Community Interest Company of residents was formed, which proposed to "finally come together to ensure that [their] needs and way of life in the park are protected as much as possible." However they were outbid by Ting Dene Lifestyle Parks, who have owned the Fitties since 2017.

== See also ==
- Dowling, A Humberston Fitties: The Story of a Lincolnshire Plotland (2023) Pub. Independent Publishing Network ISBN 9781803527321
- Holmes, G Humberston Fitties: Northern plotlanders determined to live on in face of adversity 9 June 2017, The Independent
