= Humberston Abbey =

Abbey in Humberston, Lincolnshire, England

Coordinates: 53.53406°N 0.02596°W

Humberston Abbey was an abbey in Humberston, Lincolnshire, England.

The Benedictine Abbey of Saint Mary and Saint Peter was founded in 1160 by William son of Ralf, son of Drogo, son of Hermer, as an abbey of the Tironensian Order. In 1305 the monastic buildings were destroyed by fire, and the brethren were obliged to beg alms and sell the advowson of one of their churches to the prior of Holy Trinity, Norwich before they could rebuild them.

It adopted Benedictine orders sometime after 1413, as the Bishop of Lincoln in 1422 said that the monks of Humberston took their origin from St. Mary's, Hamby in the Diocese of Coutances. The abbey was never taken into the king's hands as an Alien house.

The abbey was dissolved in 1536. The abbey buildings were located to the south of St Peter's Church in Humberston.
