= Humberston Academy =

Location
- Humberston Avenue; Humberston, Grimsby, North East Lincolnshire, DN36 4TF; England; 53.52943°N 0.03111°W

Information
- Type: Academy
- Motto: Broadening Horizons
- Established: 1977
- Department for Education URN: 137200 Tables
- Ofsted: Reports
- Sponsor: The David Ross Education Trust
- Principal: Dan Shoubridge
- Gender: Coeducational
- Age: 11 to 16
- Enrolment: 901 (as of 2024)
- Website: http://www.humberstonacademy.co.uk

Humberston Academy (formerly Humberston Maths and Computing College) is a secondary school with academy status (DRET) based in Humberston (near Grimsby), North East Lincolnshire, England.

== Admissions ==
It does not have a sixth form. It is situated on Humberston Avenue (B1219 - off the A1031) in the west of Humberston. Further to the west along the B1219 is the Tollbar Academy, and the school is less than one mile north of Lincolnshire (East Lindsey - Tetney and Holton-le-Clay, which has grammar schools). Directly to the west is the Humberston Country Club golf club.

== History ==
In 1974 it was forecast to cost £640,000, for 600 children. The local community would be able to take part in recreation in the sports hall, community hall, and swimming pool. It was given the final approval on Friday 4 April 1975, to be built on 5 acres, in the Borough of Cleethorpes. When planned by Lindsey County Council it was to have 1250, with 600 in the first phase.

The construction company Taylor and Coulbeck Ltd went into liquidation in mid-January 1977. It was later built by William Wright & Sons of Lincoln. The building was not complete when the school opened. The second stage was hoped to open from 1979 to 1980. It was hoped to open in September 1978, but construction was taking place. It was an unfinished construction site, not a secondary school. Vandals entered the construction site in October 1978. The former professional footballer Rod Fletcher became PE teacher in 1977.

The school opened in 1977 as Humberston Comprehensive School, but not in the current school buildings.

By January 1979 the school was not complete. It was planned for 1250 children, but by 1979 there were only 650 in the catchment area. The second phase would not now be built. It would open as four-form school. The school governors had wanted a five-form school. In March 1979, it was planned to move the school to the new buildings before July 1979. The new school buildings opened in June 1979, with only 300 children at first.

More children would move to the new site later in 1979. There was no sixth form, but a £60,000 sixth form block was planned. Parents said that without a sixth form, it would be a 'second-class school' as 'teachers with any ambition, will not want to stay in a school without a sixth form'. The best teachers would not want to be employed in a school without a sixth form. The Lindsey County Council original plan was for a 11-18 school.

The first meeting at the school to discuss the proposals of closure, were in September 1981. By 1983, the Labour county council was looking at a single sixth form college for Grimsby instead, sited at Grimsby Institute, with all sixth forms closing except Immingham. The Conservative government education secretary refused this, as parents had told him that it would simply destroy good schools. By late 1985 it was proposed to turn the Chelmsford School into a sixth form college. The Conservatives on the council wanted to keep sixth forms, where possible. Labour had lost control of the council in May 1985. In 1985 it was highly likely that the school would close. The Conservative councillor Arthur Pollard was chairman of the education committee in 1985. The Chelmsford school would close, and the site became the new sixth form college. There were 500 in 1989.

A fire in March 1990 destroyed the gym. At one point, the fire service thought that the whole school would burn down. The fire started at 1.20am on a Saturday morning. There were 25 firemen, 5 appliances, with 100 ft high flames.

By the late 1990s, with Healing School, it was an oversubscribed school, with parents choosing these two schools other Grimsby secondary schools, which could be frequently chaotic, being regularly quoted in adverts of local estate agents, which described the school as 'popular'. Nearby Caistor Grammar School was also popular with Grimsby parents, for the sixth form.

Until 1996 it was administered by Humberside Education Committee, based in Beverley. A 53 year old teacher was given a £2,000 fine at Caistor magistrates in February 1996. He had been caught out when police obtained a mailing list for child pornography video material. He had been at the Hereford School for five years, teaching careers and humanities.

It gained specialist status in 2006. In January 2009 it was placed in special measures. From September 2009, the school name changed from Humberston School to Humberston Maths and Computing College.

The school converted to academy status in 2011 and was renamed Humberston Academy. the school is now sponsored by the David Ross Education Trust.

=== Headteachers ===
- 1977 - Mrs Brenda Hall, appointed in February 1977, she attended Wintringham Grammar School for Girls, taking part in the school dramatic society, and trained as a teacher at the University of Birmingham in the early 1950s and was the headmistress of the Manning Grammar School for Girls in Nottingham, which became comprehensive in 1975, and became Nottingham Girls' Academy in 2011
- 1986 Bill Cormack

== Academic performance ==
In the last round of GCSE exams, the school gained the third best GCSE results for North East Lincolnshire.

== Notable former pupils ==
- Keeley Donovan, BBC weather presenter
- Max Wright (English footballer), Grimsby Town footballer: Max Wright
- Harry Clifton (footballer, born 1998), Grimsby Town footballer: Harry Clifton
- Adam Drury (footballer, born 1993)
