= Humberston =

Coordinates: 53.52807°N 0.02489°W

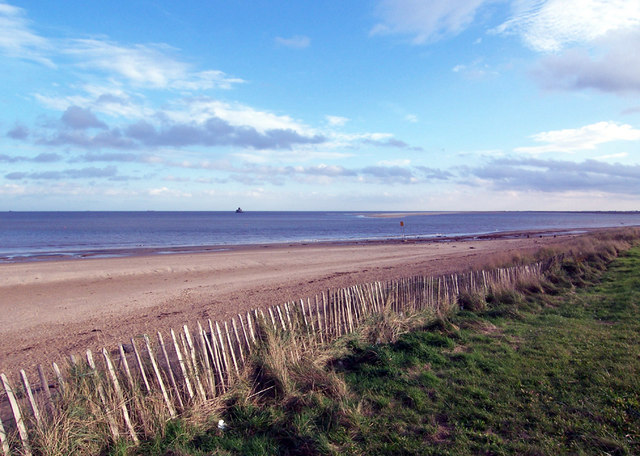
- Humberston Beach

- Location within Lincolnshire
- Interactive map showing the parish boundary
- Area: 9.6 km^{2} (3.7 sq mi)
- Population: 6,422 (2021 census)
  - Density: 669/km^{2} (1,730/sq mi)
- OS grid reference: TA310053
  - London: 140 mi (230 km) S
- Unitary authority: North East Lincolnshire
- Ceremonial county: Lincolnshire
- Region: Yorkshire and the Humber
- Country: England
- Sovereign state: United Kingdom
- Post town: Grimsby
- Postcode district: DN36
- Police: Humberside
- Fire: Humberside
- Ambulance: East Midlands
- UK Parliament: Brigg and Immingham

Humberston is a village and civil parish south of Cleethorpes in North East Lincolnshire, England.

== Geography ==
Humberston civil parish covers an area of 9.6 square kilometres (3.7 sq mi). The parish boundary with Cleethorpes runs along North Sea Lane and Humberston Road. Humberston's civil parish does not completely cover the built-up area of the village, which extends north of the boundary into the Cleethorpes unparished area, and is separated from the Cleethorpes built-up area by Cleethorpes Country Park. The prime meridian runs east of Humberston, through the Thorpe Park caravan site.

== History ==
The Danes landed at the site of the village in 870. Humberston (or Humberstone, as the village was first known) takes its name from a large boulder, the "Humber Stone", which was deposited on the site of the former Midfield Farm during the last ice age. The boulder may be seen at the entrance to the village library, near St Peter's Church. The boulder was discovered in the winter of 1956/7 while deep ploughing was taking place at Midfield Farm. Two years later it was moved to Wendover Paddock in the village, and when the new library was built it was moved there. There is no evidence that this is the stone from which the village gets its name, but it was described by Professor H H Swinnerton and Sir William Pugh of Hull University as a glacial boulder of Scottish origin of the type from which the village may have got its name. The "e" at the end of the name was dropped to avoid confusion with a place with the same name.

The oldest and tallest building in Humberston is St Peter's Church. The church was rebuilt about 1710 but its tower is over seven hundred years old. At the rear of the church is the site of the former Humberston Abbey, a monastery of Benedictine monks, which was founded during the reign of Henry II and dedicated to Saints Mary and Peter. Nearly all that remains is the monks' mound in the manor house garden, stone sarcophagi have been excavated. The Wesleyan Methodists built a small chapel on Humberston Avenue in 1835, and a larger replacement chapel was built in 1907. An early wireless station was built in 1910.

== Governance ==
Humberston and New Waltham is an electoral ward of North East Lincolnshire Council. Two of the councillors for the ward currently are Conservatives and one is Reform. The total population of the ward at the 2011 census was 10,848.

Humberston is in the Brigg and Immingham parliamentary constituency.

== Demographics ==
At the 2021 census, Humberston civil parish had a population of 6,422 people in 2,908 households. The Office for National Statistics also define a 6.6 square kilometres (2.5 sq mi) contiguous Humberston and New Waltham built-up area, which includes part of New Waltham parish and part of the Cleethorpes unparished area, but excludes the more rural south of Humberston parish; this had a population of 14,860 in 2021. In the 2020s, the village is being expanded further with a development of 400 newbuild homes.

Census population of Humberston parish
Census	Population	Female	Male	Households	Source
2001	5,384	2,797	2,587	2,297	
2011	5,634	2,862	2,772	2,536	
2021	6,422	3,325	3,097	2,908	

== Economy ==
Humberston's contemporary economy is predominantly service-oriented and closely integrated with the larger labour markets of Cleethorpes and Grimsby. Local commerce is concentrated in two hubs: Humberston Business Park on Wilton Road, a cluster of small industrial and service units, and Hewitts Business Park on Blossom Avenue, a modern office/light-industrial estate.

Hewitts Business Park sits beside the wider Hewitts Circus retail area, which includes a major supermarket and multiple motor-vehicle dealerships, reinforcing Humberston's role as a residential and retail-service centre rather than a heavy-industrial location.

Notable local businesses include: Pattesons Glass, a glass packaging distributor; SVT Ltd (Specialist Vocational Training), a vocational training provider; Duffy's Chocolate, an artisan chocolatier; and Mucky Mutts pet grooming services.

The composition of these parks – personal services, food manufacturing, household trades, and light industrial suppliers – reflects a small-firm, consumer-facing economy serving the village and neighbouring towns. Resident employment mirrors the broader North East Lincolnshire profile, with significant shares in process/plant, logistics, and service occupations, and commuting flows to nearby urban centres.

== Education and sports ==
A comprehensive school, Humberston Academy (formerly Humberston School and the Humberston Maths and Computing College) is located on Humberston Avenue. Next to the academy is Humberston Cloverfields Primary School.

The village has at least two football teams based out of it, Coach House and Fosse Water Treatment FC. Both teams play in the Grimsby, Cleethorpes and District Sunday League. Because of a lack of facilities both teams regularly play in nearby Bradley village.

An extinct team Humberston FC also played in the Grimsby, Cleethorpes and District Sunday League.

The Bannatyne health club and spa contains a WHS-rated golf course, whose 9 greens each have two holes.

== Places of interest ==
A man-made lake off North Sea Lane is in the centre of Cleethorpes Country Park. The park has picnic benches, fishing jetties and dog-swimming and wildlife areas. It is home to Canada geese and other wild birds.

The Humberston Fitties conservation area, known as Fitties Field during the late 1940s and early 1950s, is in the village. Also in Humberston is Cleethorpes Beach, a Haven Holidays caravan park.

== Gallery ==
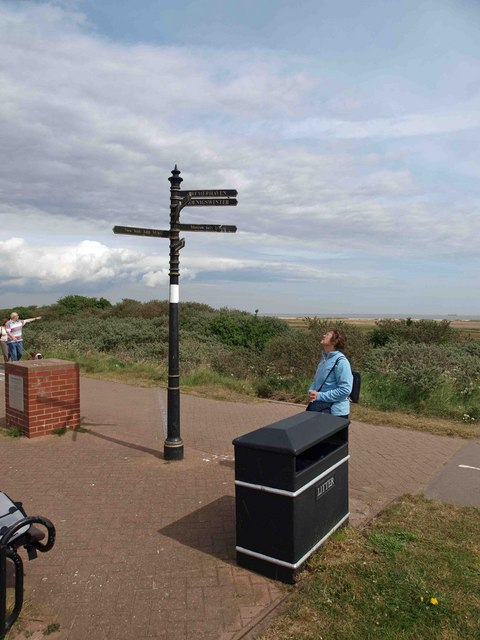
Greenwich Meridian Line

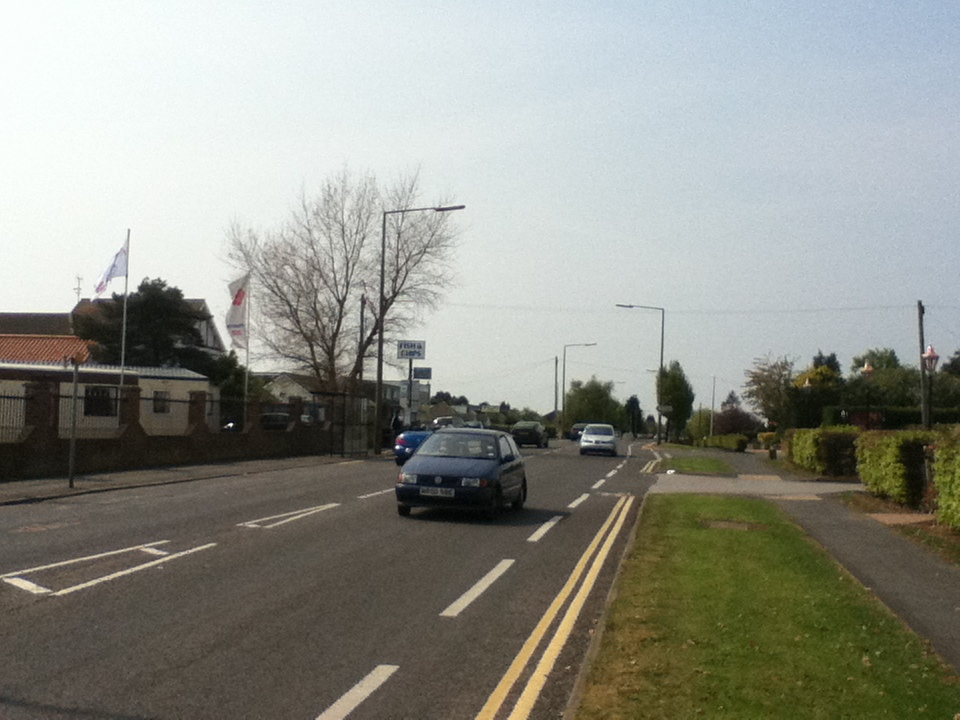
North Sea Lane

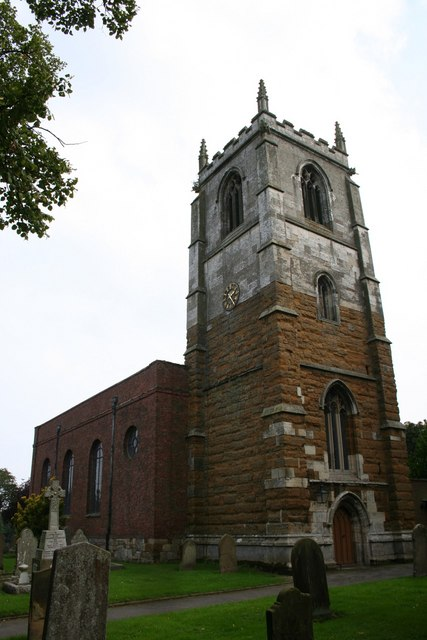
St Peter's Church
