= Assembly rooms (disambiguation) =

Assembly rooms may refer to:

- Assembly rooms, a gathering place in either the United Kingdom or Ireland
- Assembly Rooms, Belfast
- Assembly Rooms (Edinburgh)
- Assembly Rooms Cinema Hall, in Ooty
- Assembly Rooms Theatre (Durham)
- Barton-upon-Humber Assembly Rooms
- Bath Assembly Rooms, in Bath, England
- Grand Assembly Rooms, an interdisciplinary research facility at Newcastle University
- York Assembly Rooms, in York, England
