= Wilderspin =

Wilderspin is an English surname. Notable people with the surname include:

- Clive Wilderspin (1930–2021), Australian tennis player
- Samuel Wilderspin (1792–1866), English educator
