= Philip Pape =

Philip Pape (1910-1982) was a British sculptor and stonemason.

== Biography ==
Pape was born in Beverley in 1910 and moved with his family to Barton-upon-Humber in 1913. He, like his father, was a stonemason. As a conscientious objector, he started creating sculptural works in stone during the second world war.

In 1951 Pape was commissioned by Lindsey County Council to create commemorative plaques for the new schools that were being opened following the Second World War, and in 1955 he was commissioned to produce sculptures to be displayed in them.

A blue plaque on the exterior of Tyrwhitt Hall records that Philip Pape, a "sculptor, singer, and choirmaster", lived and worked in the house from 1960 to 1982.

=== Works ===
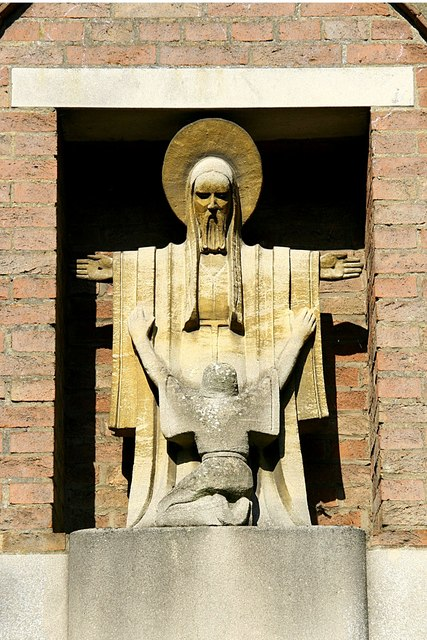
Doubting Thomas figure by Philip Pape, above the south door of St. Thomas' church

Pape's works are primarily sculptural stonework. In 1956 he was commissioned to create a 20-ft high wall carving at Baysgarth School depicting an "animated scene of a teacher with pupils". It was originally gilded. A planning condition of the 2016 demolition of the old school and reconstruction of a new one was the preservation of this mural was preserved in situ. In 1956 he also produced a stone carved figure of St Thomas kneeling to the risen Christ is in St Thomas' Church, Boston. In 1957 he restored a 1897 monument and drinking trough in Saxby All Saints. The trough is now a grade II listed structure.

A number of his works have been donated to the Baysgarth House Museum. These include: 'Girl holding a book', a sculpture in stone depicting a young girl in high relief facing forwards whilst turning the page of a book, and other stone sculptures such as 'Frog', 'Hands' and 'Lion'. 'Dove', a fibreglass sculpture of a dove set into a stone plinth was originally displayed in a local retirement home and then donated to the museum in 2012. Several works in plaster are also in the museum's collection: 'Urn', 'Cherub', 'Oak leaves', and 'Tudor Rose'. An un-named metal sculpture remains in situ on the wall of an estate agents in Church Lane, Grimsby.

Pape's final work, 'The sunflower' remains unfinished. He was working on it at the time of his death in 1982.
