= Ropewalk (disambiguation) =

A ropewalk is a long straight narrow lane, or a covered pathway, where long strands of material are laid before being twisted into rope.

Ropewalk may also refer to:

== Arts and entertainment ==
- Ropewalk (album), by The View, 2015
- Ropewalk (film), a 2000 American romantic comedy film

== Places ==
- Ropewalk (Karlskrona), a building on the island of Lindholmen, Sweden
- Ropewalk, Barton-upon-Humber, a regional centre for the arts in North Lincolnshire, England
- RopeWalks, Liverpool, a vicinity of Liverpool city centre, England
- Ropewalk Pumping Station, on the Ropewalk in Nottingham, England
- Ropewalk Shopping Centre, in Nuneaton, Warwickshire, England

== See also ==
- Rope
- Tightrope walking
