= United Reformed Church (disambiguation) =

The United Reformed Church is a Protestant Christian church in the United Kingdom.

United Reformed Church may also refer to:

== Buildings in England ==
- United Reformed Church, Barton-upon-Humber, Lincolnshire
- United Reformed Church, Burton Joyce, Nottinghamshire
- United Reformed Church, Crosby, Merseyside
- United Reformed Church, Muswell Hill, London
- United Reformed Church, Portland, Dorset
- United Reformed Church, Stamford, Lincolnshire
- United Reformed Church, Stoke-sub-Hamdon, Somerset
- United Reformed Church, Street, Somerset
- United Reformed Church, Upwey, Dorset
- United Reformed Church, Winsford, Over, Cheshire

== Other denominations ==
- United Reformed Church in Congo
- United Reformed Church in Myanmar
- United Reformed Churches in North America
- Uniting Reformed Church in Southern Africa
