= Sidell (surname) =

Sidell is an English surname. Notable people with the surname include:

- Margaret Elizabeth Sidell (born 1947), British teacher and local councillor
- William Sidell (1915–1994), American carpenter and labor leader
