= Danielle Sharp =

English model and actress (born 1991)

- Born: Danielle Kristie Sharp; 21 August 1991 (age 35); Grimsby, Lincolnshire, England
- Occupations: Model; actress
- Modeling information
- Height: 5 ft 5 in (1.65 m)
- Hair color: Brown
- Eye color: Blue

Danielle Kristie Sharp (born 21 August 1991) is an English model and actress.

== Early life ==
Danielle Sharp was born on 21 August 1991 in Grimsby, then moved to Ulceby with her family. She attended Matthew Humberstone School, Baysgarth School in Barton-upon-Humber, and John Leggott College in Scunthorpe.

She attended the University of Central Lancashire in Preston, graduating with a Bachelor of Arts degree in Fashion Brand Management in 2013.

== Career ==
=== Modeling ===
She started working for the Samantha Bond modeling agency in the summer of 2011. She was named "sexiest student in Britain" by Loaded magazine on the November 2011 issue. She became a staple of lad mags in Britain in 2012 and 2013, appearing repeatedly in Loaded, Front, and Nuts (whose readers voted her sixth among Nuts' 100 Sexiest Babes on the 30 November issue). She also appeared in FHM, where she was voted number 100 on the FHM 100 Sexiest of 2015.

=== Acting ===
She began acting in 2014, studying drama at ICAT, and became an active member of The Actors Centre in London, where she encountered the Meisner technique, which she went on to study at The Impulse Company, and graduated in 2016.

She appeared alongside David Walliams in the music video for "Don't Even Try" by Bryan Adams from his album Get Up (2015).

== See also ==
- The Sun newspaper
