= David Mason (Royal Marine) =

British teacher and British Royal Marines officer

David Mason MBE is a teacher and former Regimental Sergeant Major in the Royal Marines.

== Biography ==
Mason attended Baysgarth School in Barton-upon-Humber from 1986 to 1991 before joining the Royal Marines.

After joining the marines he was posted to 3 Commando Brigade and served in Northern Ireland, Yugoslavia, Iraq, and Afghanistan. He was promoted to the rank of Regimental sergeant major. Whilst serving with the marines, Mason studied for an undergraduate degree in history with the Open University and a master's degree in military history from the University of Birmingham.

Mason studied for a PGCE at the University of Exeter. He undertook his training at Haygrove School in Somerset.

He was awarded an MBE in the 2021 New Year Honours.
