= Wendy Witter =

British public servant (1936–2024)

Wendy Witter MBE (28 February 1936 – 12 March 2024) was a public servant and charity worker from Barton-upon-Humber, North Lincolnshire, England.

== Biography ==
Witter was born in Scunthorpe. She attended Scunthorpe High School before starting an apprenticeship with J. Lyons and Co. in London. She returned to Scunthorpe to work in the family window-cleaning business. Wendy moved with husband David to Barton-upon-Humber in 1968.

In the following decades, Wendy served as a school governess for St Hugh's Special School in Scunthorpe and Baysgarth School. She was a member of various public and consumer boards including the Gas Consumers' Council. She was an awarded an MBE in the 1992 New Year Honours whilst serving as Chairman of the Humberside Committee for the Employment of Disabled People. She served as the Mayor of Barton-upon-Humber in 1976, 1996, and 2006.

In 2005, Witter was appointed Director of Age UK in North Lincolnshire. She was the Director of the charity Voluntary Action North Lincolnshire from October 2008 until her retirement in October 2014.

In July 2019, she was given one of the two annual awards by the Barton-upon-Humber Civic Society, in recognition of her decades of public service in the town.
