= St Mary's Church, Barton-upon-Humber =

St Mary's Church
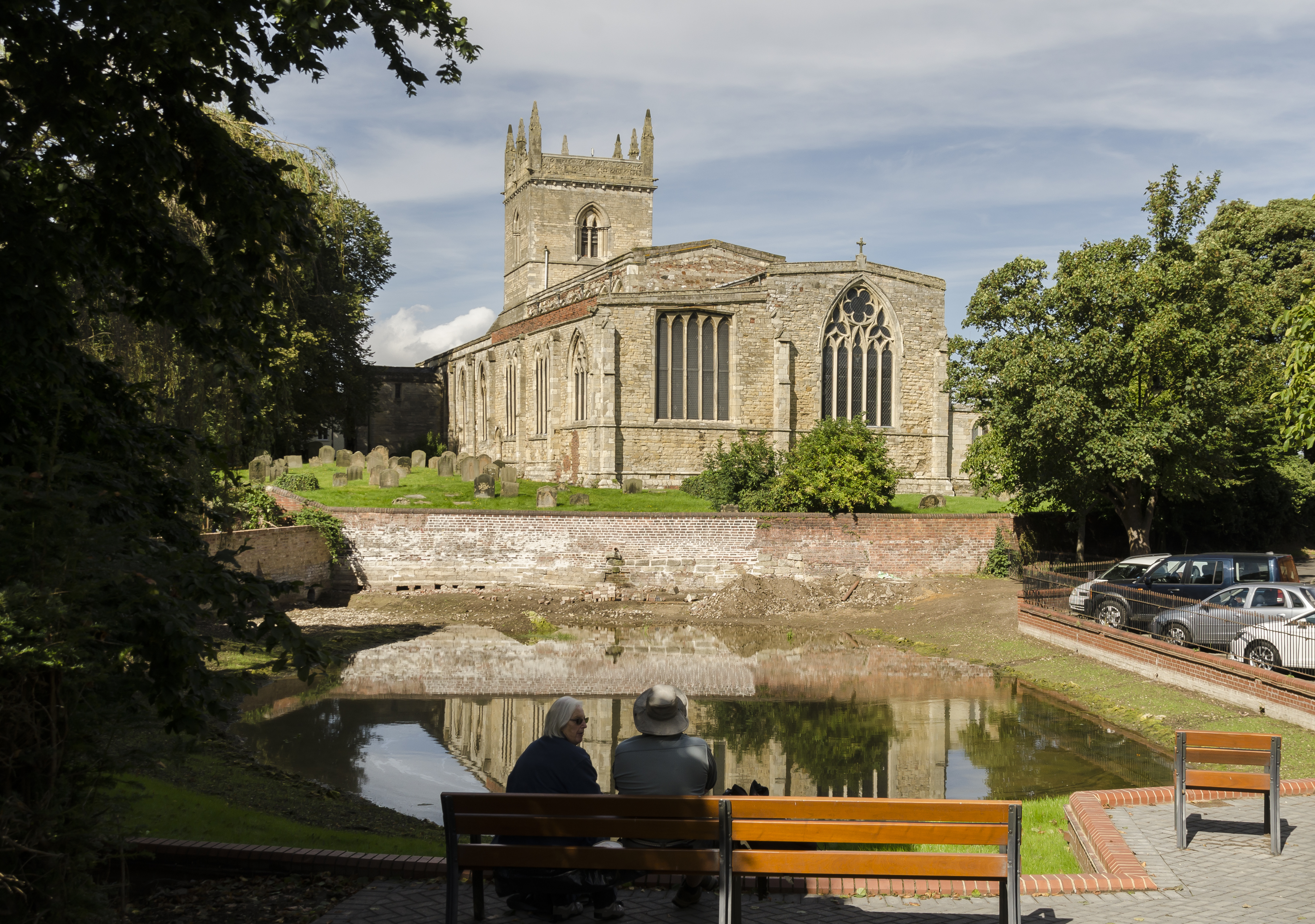
- Church, from across the beck
- St Mary's Church
- 53.6844°N 0.43673°W
- OS grid reference: TA 03345 22020
- Location: Barton-upon-Humber
- Country: England
- Denomination: Church of England

History
- Status: Church
- Founded: 12th century on site of a former, probably Saxon, foundation.
- Dedication: St Mary the Virgin ('All Saints' Chapel' 1115)

Architecture
- Heritage designation: Grade I
- Designated: 21 September 1966
- Style: Norman, Early English

St Mary's Church (or The Parish Church of Saint Mary the Virgin) is an Anglican church and Grade I Listed building in Barton-upon-Humber, North Lincolnshire, England.

== Architecture ==
The earliest structure above ground on the site is now dated as belonging to the 12th Century. The arcades, according to an account of an investigation in the late 19th century, appear to rest on the foundations of an earlier, possibly Saxon, structure, conceivably related to the 'All Saints' Chapel' recorded in an 1115 charter of Walter de Gant. The majority of the building is in the Early English style. The windows date to the 14th and 15th centuries with the window glass assembled in the 17th century. It included chancel monuments dating to 1626 and 1729. The porch was restored in 1938.

A thorough description of the architecture and archæology of the site appears in the chapter 'St Mary's Church' within Rodwell & Atkins 'St Peter's Barton-upon-Humber' (Vol 1.i pp 69–140, Oxbow 2011)

== Gallery ==
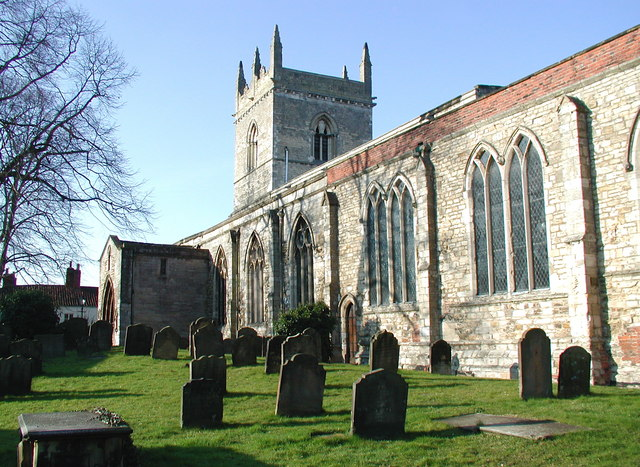

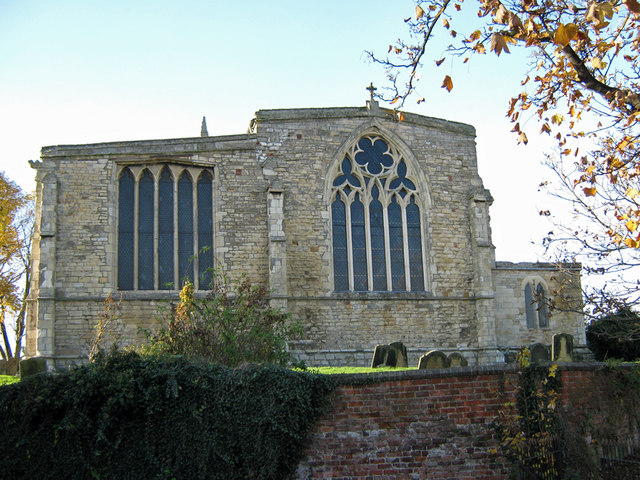

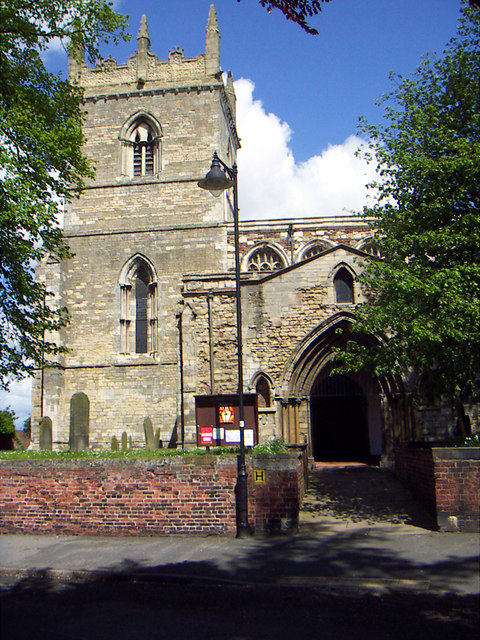

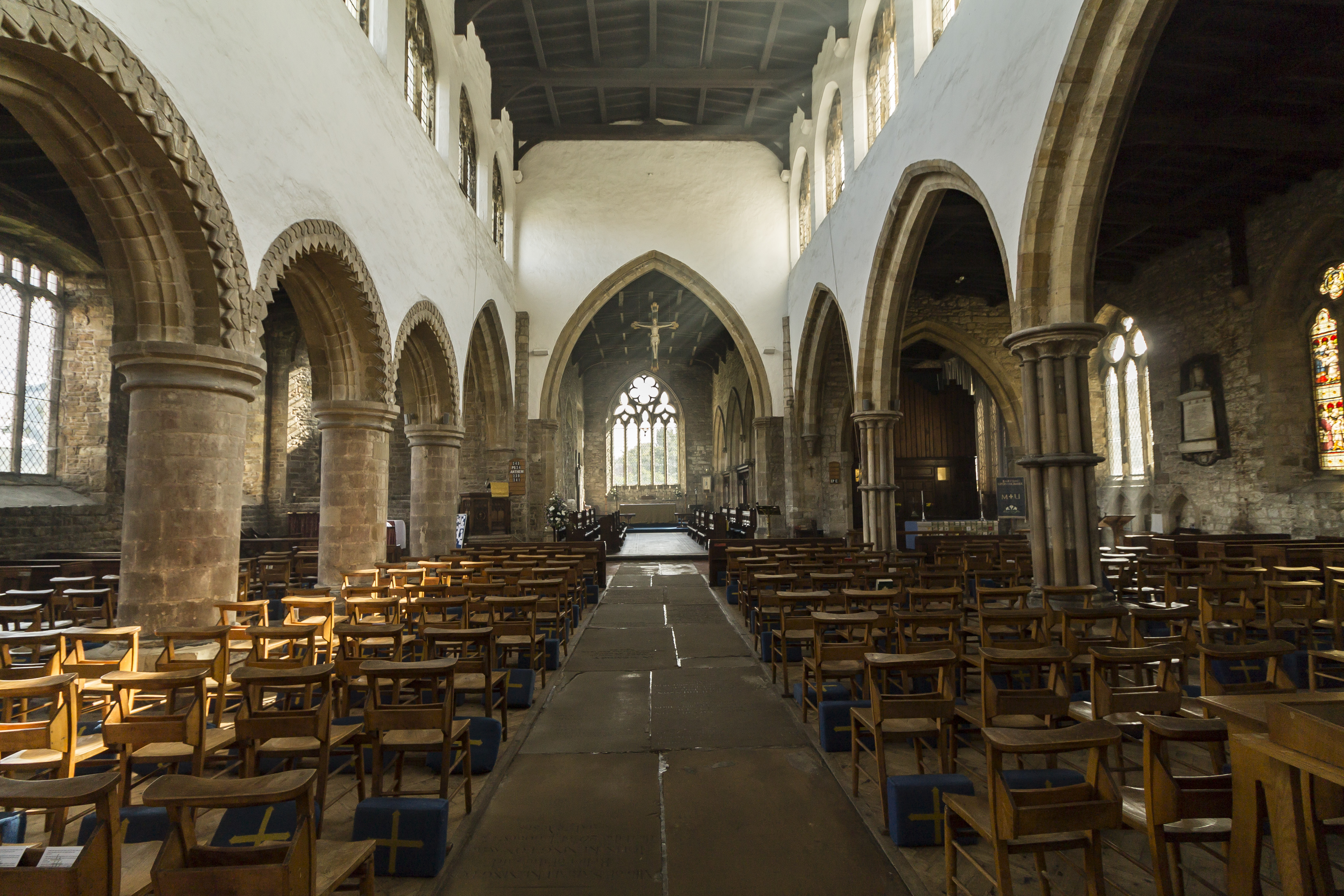

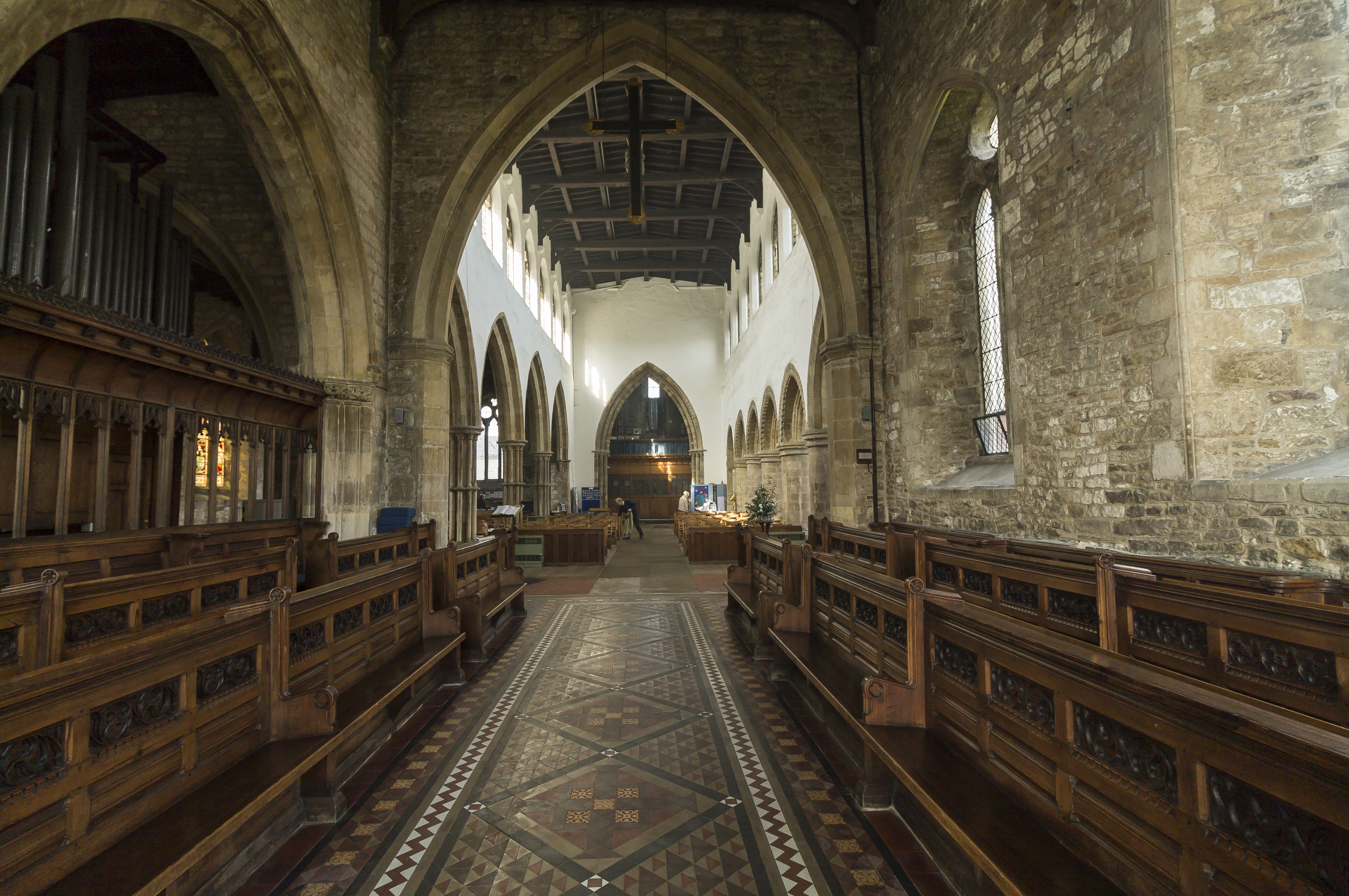
