= Tyrwhitt Hall =

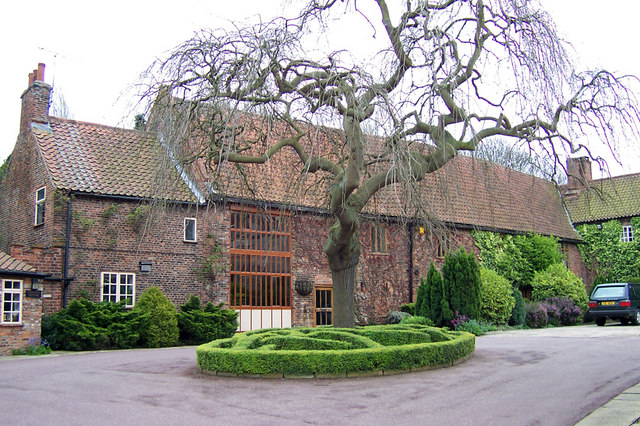

- Location in Lincolnshire
- 53.683929°N 0.43382356°W
- Location: East Acridge, Barton-upon-Humber, North Lincolnshire, DN18 5HL, United Kingdom
- OS grid reference: TA 03535 21969

Listed Building – Grade II*
- Designated: 21 September 1966
- Reference no.: 1083105

Tyrwhitt Hall (pronounced "Tirrit") is a late medieval residence and a Grade II* Listed building in Barton-upon-Humber, North Lincolnshire.

== History ==
The earliest phase of the building dates from at least the 15th century, with prominent extensions and alterations in the 17th and 18th centuries. It is named after the Tyrwhitt baronets who lived in the building in the 16th century. A blue plaque on its exterior records that Philip Pape, a sculptor, singer, and choirmaster, lived and worked in the house from 1960 to 1982.

A large ditched enclosure, encompassing the manor, was discovered during the excavation of the nearby St Peter's Church. It pre-dated the church and is tentatively dated to the 10th century, suggesting that there may have been an earlier structure on this site than the 15th century phases of the building so far identified.
