= The Volunteer Arms, Barton-upon-Humber =

The Volunteer Arms
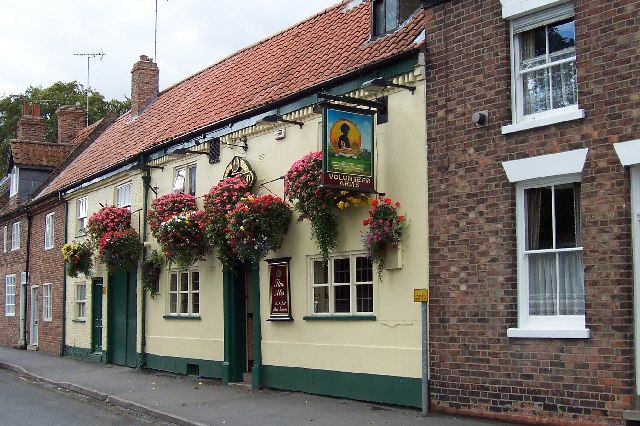
- The inn viewed from the northeast

- Location within Lincolnshire
- 53.682012°N 0.43778124°W
- Location: 25 Whitecross Street, Barton-upon-Humber, North Lincolnshire, England

History
- Built: 18th century

Site notes
- Architectural style: Vernacular

Listed Building – Grade II
- Designated: 17 September 1976
- Reference no.: 1083051

The Volunteer Arms is a grade II listed building and working public house in Barton-upon-Humber, North Lincolnshire, England.
