= Barton Waterside =

Coordinates: 53.69°N 0.45°W

- Location within Lincolnshire
- OS grid reference: TA0223
- Unitary authority: North Lincolnshire
- Ceremonial county: Lincolnshire
- Region: Yorkshire and the Humber
- Country: England
- Sovereign state: United Kingdom
- Post town: Barton-upon-Humber
- Postcode district: DN18
- Police: Humberside
- Fire: Humberside
- Ambulance: East Midlands

Barton Waterside is a village in North Lincolnshire, England. It is in the civil parish of Barton-upon-Humber. Barton Waterside consists of the former port area at the north end of Barton-upon-Humber. The community is centred on Barton Haven – a late Anglo-Saxon artificial harbour – which was dug c. 1000 AD to create a reliable deep water port for the extreme north of Lindsey. It seems possible that the project was initiated by Peterborough Abbey which had interests in the parish at that time.

Barton-upon Humber was a medium-sized port in the early Middle Ages with the majority of the commercial activity being concentrated at the head of Haven close to Fleetgate and the modern day railway station. Barton declined as a port after the foundation of Kingston upon Hull c. 1300. By 1550 the port was of only local significance.

The oldest building presently surviving within the area is the Waterside Inn (now Waterside House) built in 1715. This was the southern terminus for the ferry to Hull until it ceased running in the 1850s. This building is about one-third of its former size due to the demolition of the former hotel c. 1860. In the early nineteenth century a daily mail coach ran from Barton Waterside via Brigg to Lincoln. After the introduction of paddle steamers c. 1818 a three or four times daily service between Barton and Hull left from a long wooden pier at the bottom of Waterside Road at a place locally called Point. This pier was later used by the Coastguard Station which closed in 1927, after which it was removed although the foundations of the pier can still be seen at low tide.

As river traffic increased in the late 18th and 19th centuries Barton became a local port serving the river trade along the Humber, Trent, and Ouse, and the North Sea Coastal trade. Houses were built along the road leading to the ferry eventually creating a thriving suburb with its own industries, shops, pubs, schools and churches.

In the 19th century there were two whiting works, and three mills west side of Barton Haven. East of the haven were two brickyards, Hall's Ropery and the Maltings. Brown and Clapson's shipyard which opened in the 1870s, survives today as Offshore Steel Boats. At various times there were coal staithes, a petroleum depot, and various other wharves and business along the Haven.

These industries created a tight knit community of boatmen, shipwrights, loose hands and factory workers distinct from the town of Barton-upon-Humber. In addition to the various places of employment, three pubs existed on the Waterside in the late 19th and early 20th centuries – the Royal Vaults at the corner of Hewson (or Vaults) Lane and Waterside; The Sloop Inn at the corner of Far Ings Lane and Waterside, and the Waterside Inn (called "Bottom Pub" by locals) opposite the old ferry landing. There were also eight shops of which only one survives today. The two places of worship in Barton Waterside were St Chad's Mission Church (Anglican), and the Wesleyan Mission. There was also St. Chad's C of E School which operated from 1904 until 1967. Scholars of this institution were referred to locally as "Chad-Rats." The school building had served as St. Chad's Mission and Sunday School from 1894 to 1906 replacing an earlier (1863) Mission Room on the east side of the haven. The Wesleyan Mission operated from 1876 to c.1955. The buildings are now a house and a bicycle showroom.

Since the 1950s, Barton Waterside has gradually declined into a residential area at the North end of Barton-upon-Humber. Most of the shops and businesses have closed. The Sloop Inn survives, along with the shipyard. Commercial river traffic in and out of Barton Haven ceased c.1981 with the opening of the Humber Bridge. The last barge to operate regularly in and out of Barton Haven was the former Humber keel the "Hope" which brought raw materials to Hall's Barton Ropery.

The last major community building – St Chad's Mission Church – closed in 1977.
