= Francis John French =

English civil servant

Francis John French (born 1941) is a former civil servant from Barton-upon-Humber. He attended Caistor Grammar School before working as an environmental health officer. A member of the Barton Civic Society for over 30 years, he was awarded an MBE in the 2002 New Year Honours for services to the Barton-on-Humber Civic Society.
