= Oddfellows' Hall, Barton-upon-Humber =

Oddfellows' Hall
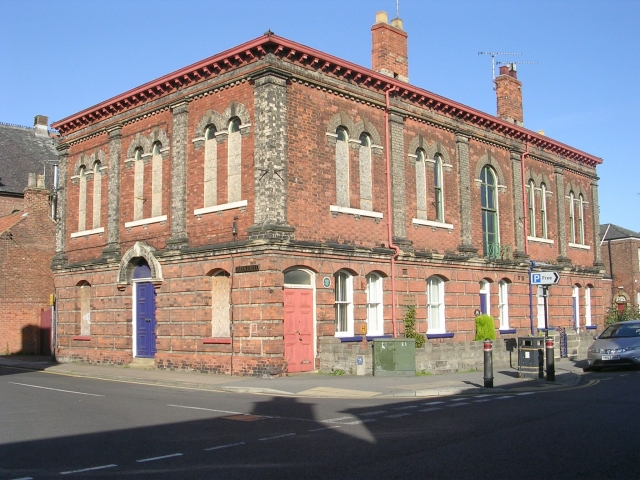

- Location in Lincolnshire
- 53.6848°N 0.43962°W
- Location: High Street, Barton-upon-Humber, North Lincolnshire, DN18 5PD, United Kingdom
- OS grid reference: TA 03150 22068

History
- Built: 1864
- Built for: Barton Lodge of the Oddfellows' Society

Site notes
- Architectural style: Palazzo

Listed Building – Grade II
- Designated: 9 April 1990
- Reference no.: 1083013

The former Oddfellows' Hall in Barton-upon-Humber is a Grade II Listed building constructed in 1864 by the Barton Lodge of the Odd Fellows Society. As well as an Oddfellows' Hall it has operated as a cinema, dance hall, roller skating rink, offices, library, and private accommodation.

== Architecture ==
The hall was built in 1864 in Palazzo style with red brick and yellow-grey brick walls and a Welsh slate roof. It is a two storey building, the upper floor of which is divided into five bays on its long side and three on its narrow side - these bays are divided by articulated yellow-grey brick pilasters. The ground floor has four-pane segmented sash windows, the upper floor has paired semi-circular headed sash windows with a large eight-pane window in the centre of the long side. All the windows are below grey brick arches. It has a stepped red and blue brick cornice with overhanging eaves. The building was listed for "historic reasons as an unusually grand and architecturally pretentious friendly society hall".

== History and use ==
The hall was built in 1864 by the Good Design Lodge at a cost of £1,000. In around 1911 it was re-purposed as Barton's first cinema, the “Electric Picture Theatre”, and showed silent movies. Latterly it was used by a theatre company and in the 1930s as a roller skating Roller rink. During the Second World War it was used as a dance hall. After the war the large hall was divided into offices for the Ministry of Labour and other governmental departments, with a public library on the ground floor.

The top half of the building, containing the hall, currently stands empty and the divided ground floor are private apartments. A blue plaque was erected on the building by the Barton Civic Society to highlight its former function.

Repairs were undertaken to the building following a council enforcement order in October 2024.

== Gallery ==
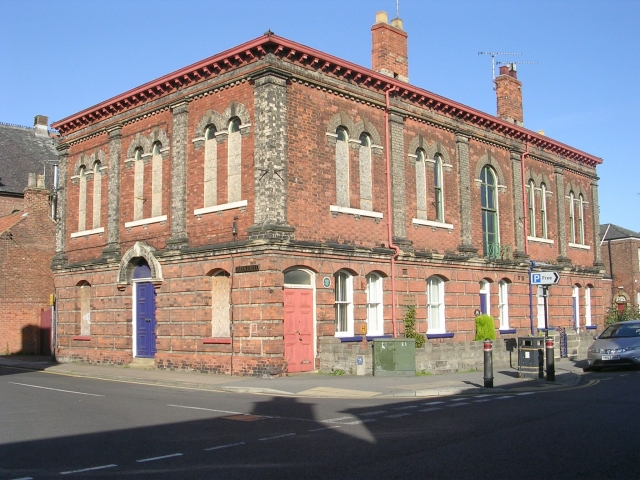
Oddfellows Hall from the corner of High Street and Queens Street

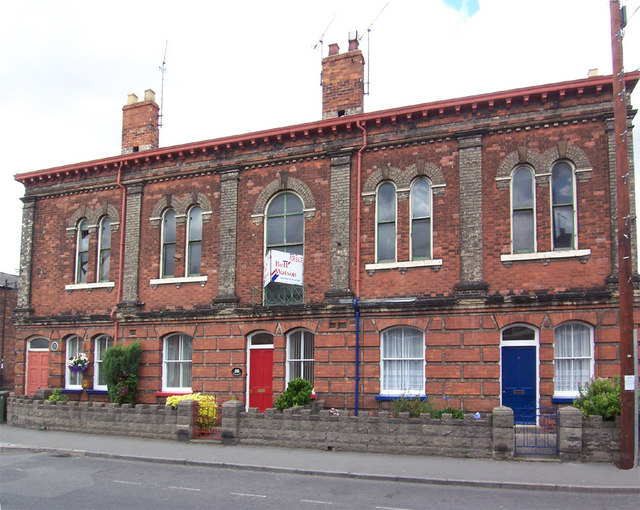
Oddfellows Hall, High Street side

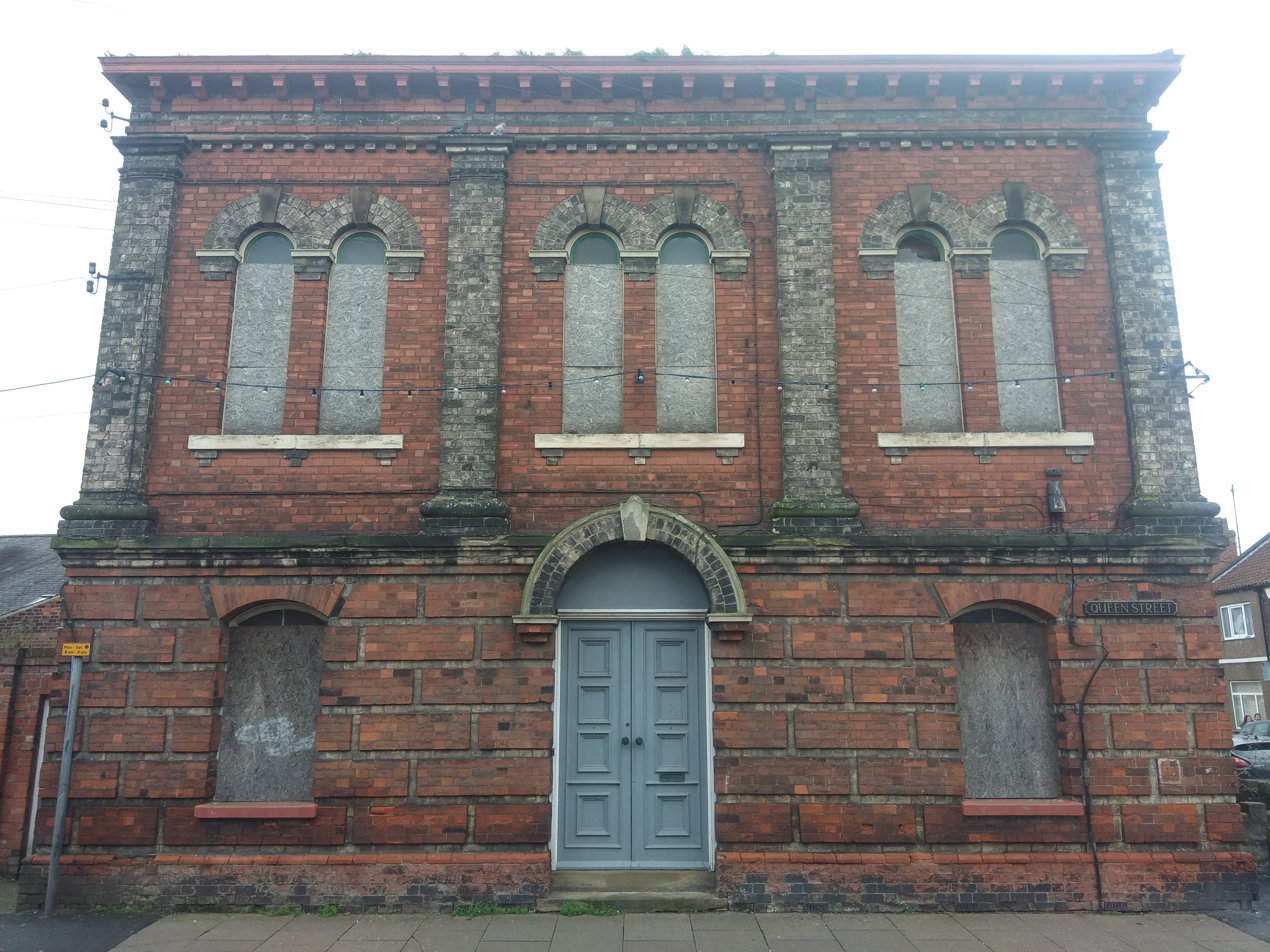
Oddfellows Hall, Queens Street side

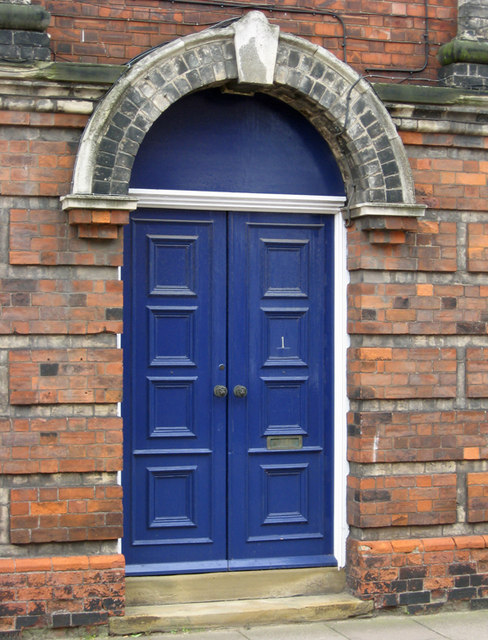
Queen's Street door detail

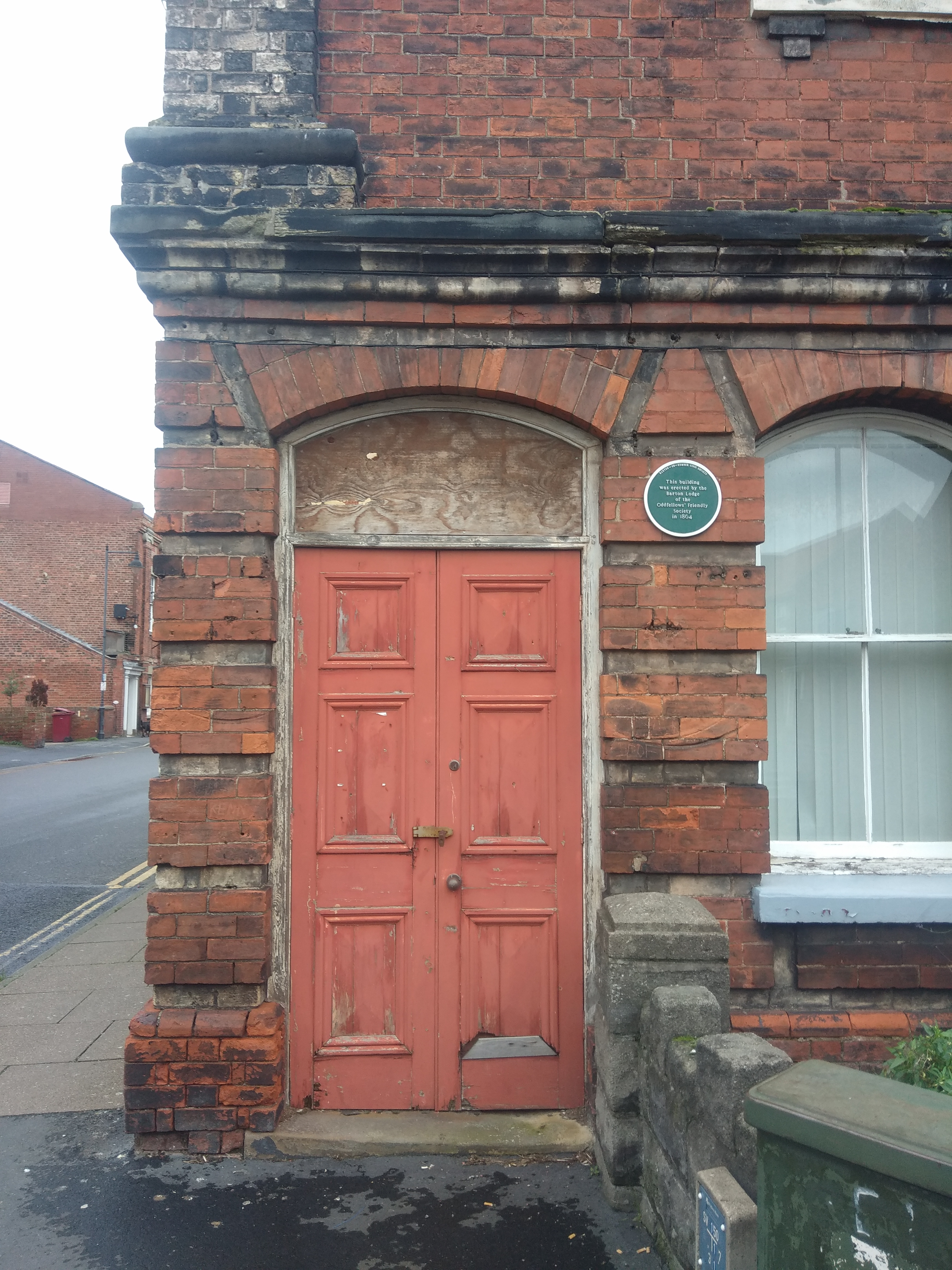
High Street door detail

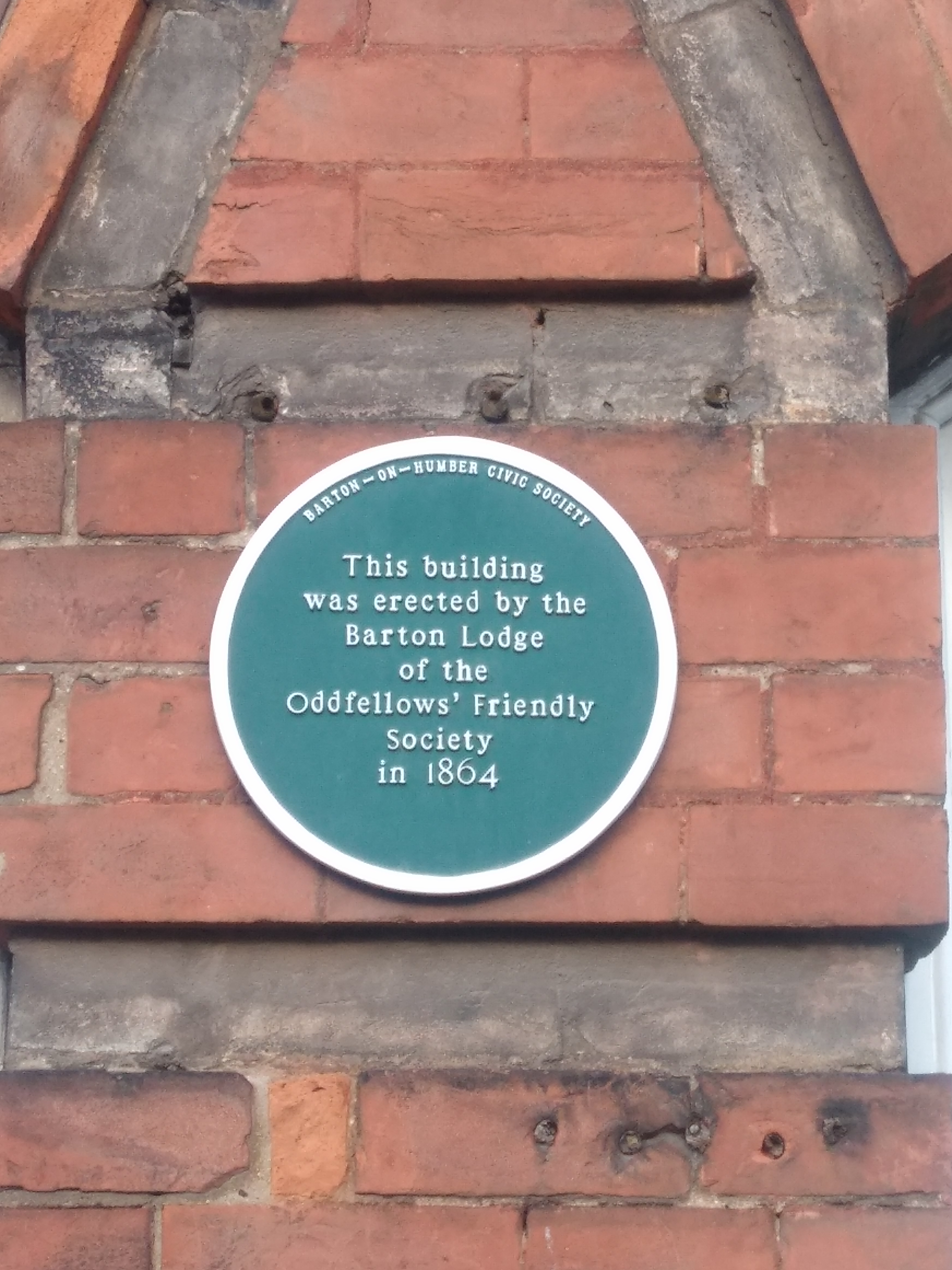
Blue plaque
