= Robert Brown (solicitor) =

Robert Brown FSA (6 July 1844 - 16 October 1912) was a British solicitor and classical philologist.

== Biography ==
Brown was born in Barton-upon-Humber and attended Cheltenham College and subsequently worked as a solicitor. Brown's academic work focused on writing about ancient religion, mythology, and Babylonian astronomy. He was a Fellow of the Society of Antiquaries of London and a Member of the Royal Astronomical Society.

A memorial window in St Peter's Church is dedicated to Brown.

=== Selected publications ===
- Brown, R. 1881. Unicorn: A mythological investigation.
- Brown, R. 1885. The Phainomena; Or, Heavenly Display of Aratos Done Into English Verse.
- Brown, R. 1898. Semitic Influence in Hellenic Mythology.
- Brown, R. 1899. Researches into the Origin of the Primitive Constellations of Greeks, Phoenicians, and Babylonians.
- Brown, R. 1906. Notes on the Earlier History of Barton-on-Humber (Vol I). London.
- Brown, R. 1908. Notes on the Earlier History of Barton-on-Humber (Vol II). London.
