= Trinity Methodist Church, Barton-upon-Humber =

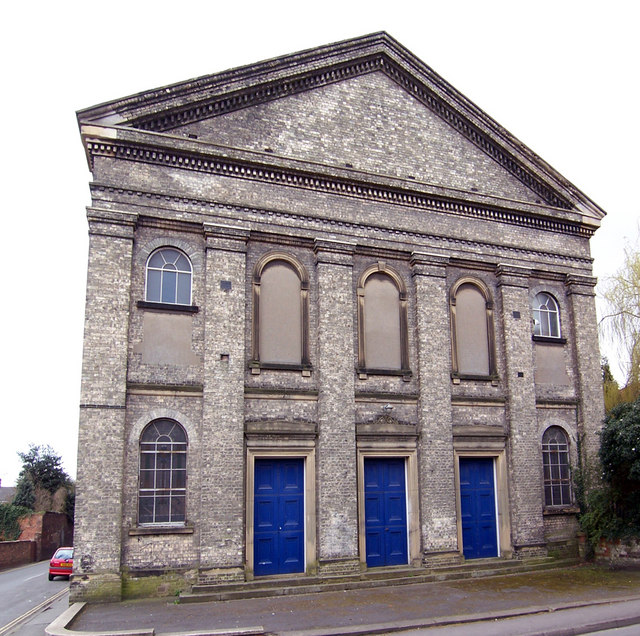

- Location in Lincolnshire
- 53.683851°N 0.440973639°W
- Location: Chapel Lane, Barton-upon-Humber, North Lincolnshire, DN18 5PJ, England
- OS grid reference: TA 03063 21950

History
- Built: 1860-1861

Listed Building – Grade II
- Designated: 17 September 1976
- Reference no.: 1083113

Trinity Methodist Church is a mid 19th-century Methodist church and a Grade II Listed building in Barton-upon-Humber, North Lincolnshire, England.

== Architecture ==
Trinity Methodist Church is a pale brick building with a pediment and a Welsh slate roof. The front is decorated with Doric pilasters. The five bays created between the pilasters all contain round-headed windows; two on each of the outer two bays and one each in the central three. The central three windows are blocked and each sit above a panelled door.

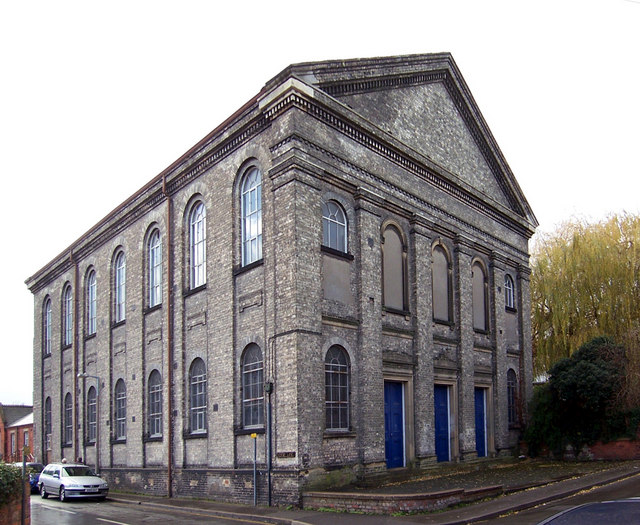
The Church from Chapel Lane

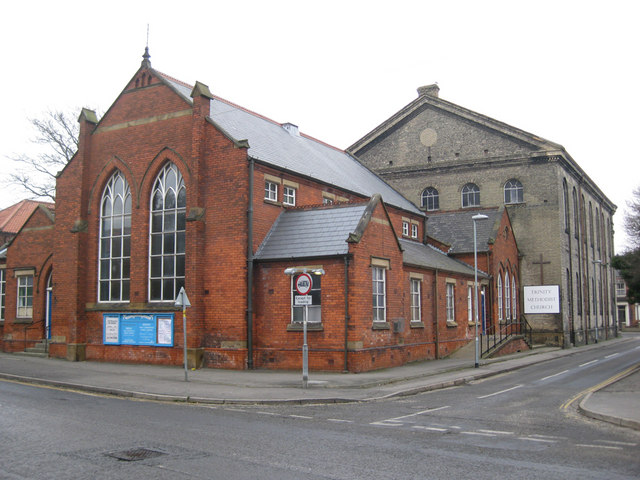
The red brick extension behind the main chapel

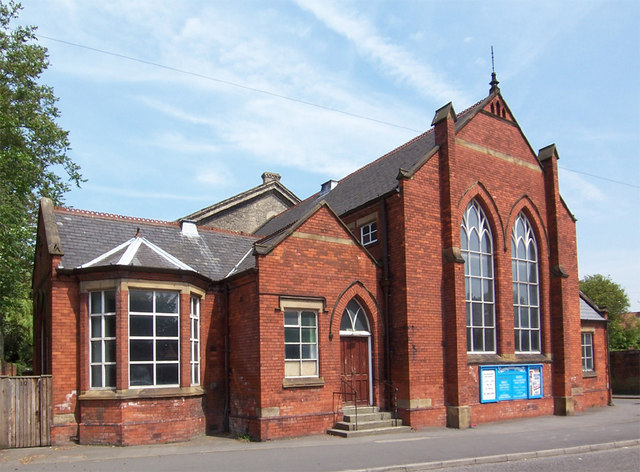
The reverse of the building from Holydyke

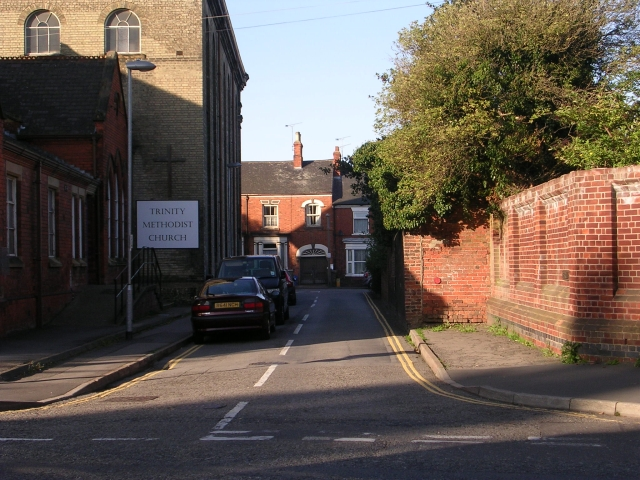
Vestry Lane, which runs to the east of the building

== History ==
A Wesleyan Society is noted in Barton-upon-Humber from at least 1760. The current Trinity Methodist Church was predated by an earlier chapel on this site, built by the Wesleyan Society and opened on 9 October 1816. The society had 46 members in 1816. This number had increased to several hundred by 1839 and the original chapel was enlarged. This first chapel was demolished by 22 May 1860 and the current building was constructed in its place, opening in early 1861.
