= The Blue Bell, Barton-upon-Humber =

Inn in Barton-upon-Humber, Lincolnshire, England

Coordinates: 53°40′56″N 0°26′14″W

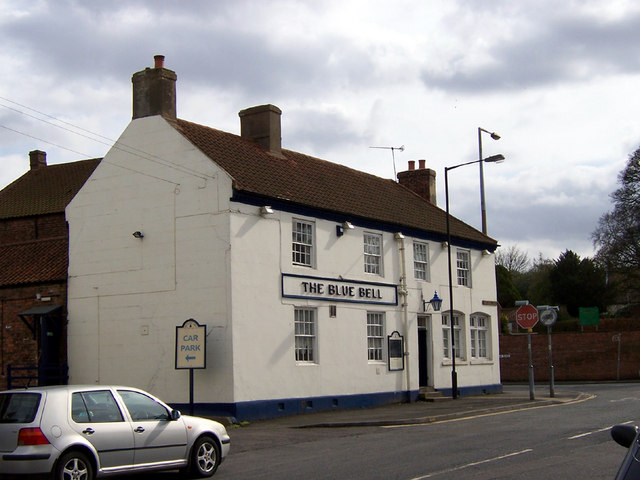
The Blue Bell Inn

The Blue Bell is a grade II listed building and former public house in Barton-upon-Humber, North Lincolnshire, England.

In 2016, the site was redeveloped into a housing complex named Blue Bell Court. This conversion project was awarded the Annual Award 2016 by Barton-upon-Humber Civic Society.

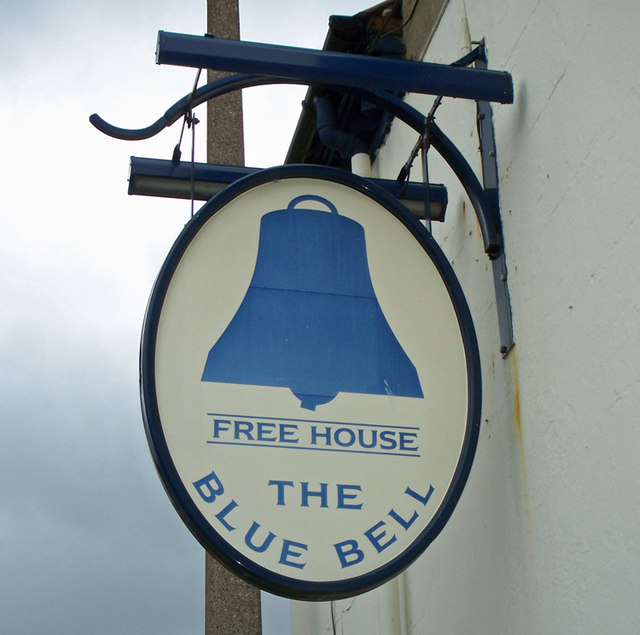
The sign of the Blue Bell Inn
