= Wilderspin National School =

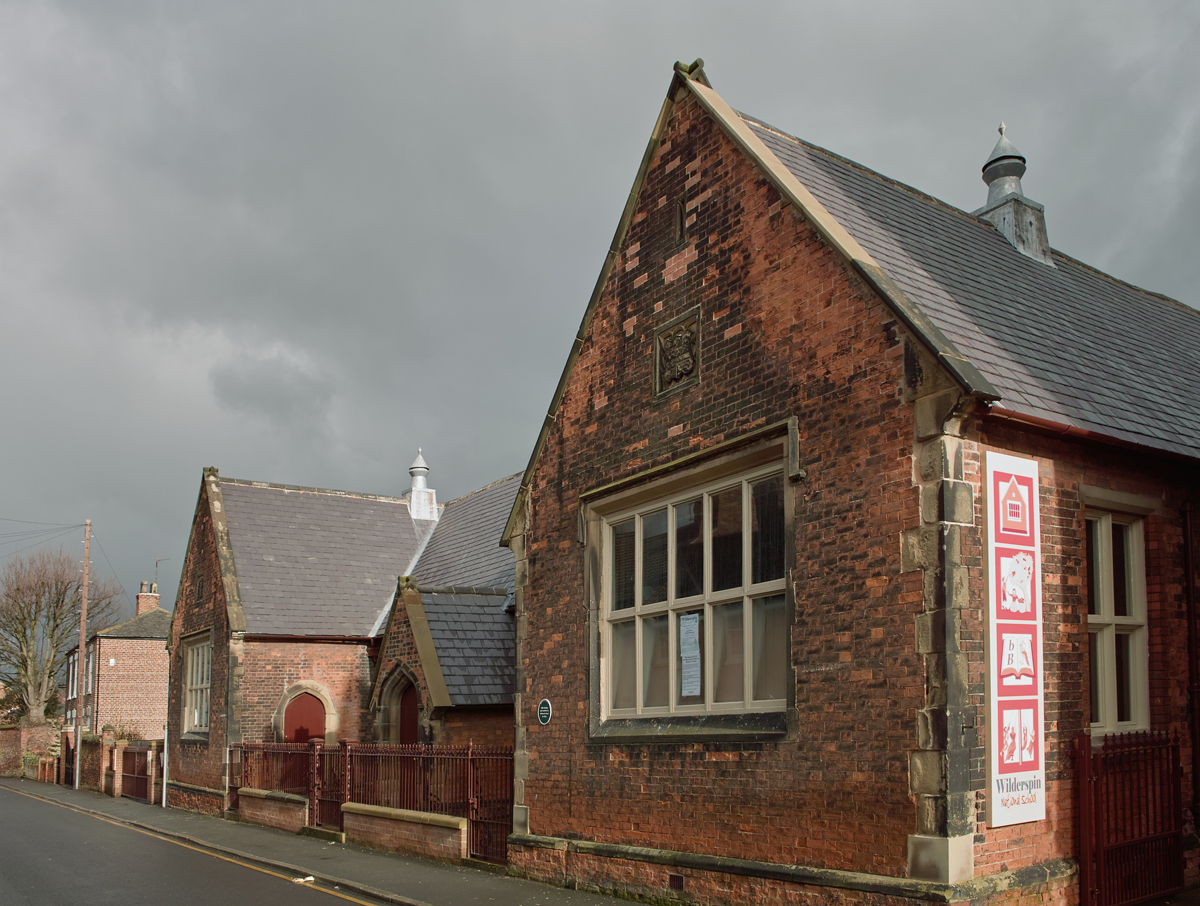

- Location within Lincolnshire
- Established: 2009; 17 years ago
- Location: Queen Street, Barton-upon-Humber, North Lincolnshire, DN18 5QP
- Coordinates: 53.6850°N 0.4398°W
- Type: Social History Museum
- Visitors: Total since 2009: 85,000
- Website: www.wilderspinschool.org.uk

The Wilderspin National School is a former national school and Grade II listed building in Barton-upon-Humber, North Lincolnshire, and a museum focussing on the life and works of Samuel Wilderspin.

== Architecture ==
The building was designed by the architect William Hey Dykes and Samuel Wilderspin for the Church of England and the National Society for the Education of the Poor in the Principles of the Established Church. It is a red brick, single storey building, in the Tudor Revival style with a Welsh slate roof. In plan it is H-shaped, originally intend for the infants to be in the area on the right, the boys to the left, and the girls in the centre. There are stone tablets carved on each of the wings, the Royal coat of arms to the left, and the arms of Reverend George Uppleby to the right. A rear extension was added in 1935.

== History ==
The school was opened in 1844 and remains nearly complete. It is the only known survival of both a Wilderspin school and playground.

When the school opened it superseded a smaller one ran by Isaac Pitman. When it opened it catered for over 100 infants aged 2–6 years old and is notable for its connection to Samuel Wilderspin who taught at the school alongside both his wife and daughter, and trained other teachers here. The school closed in 1978 and was first listed as a grade II building in September 1992.

== Gallery ==
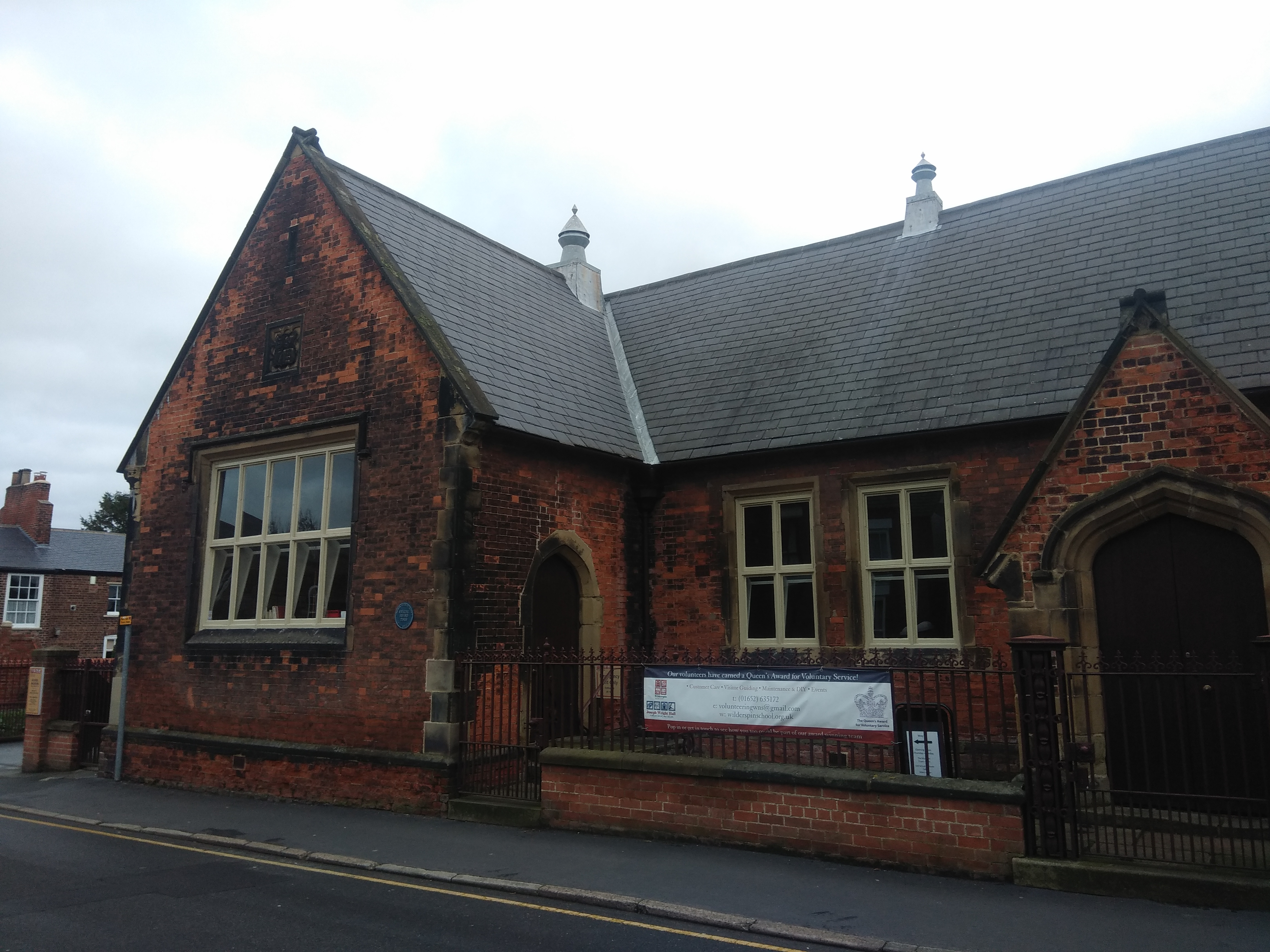
Front (left)

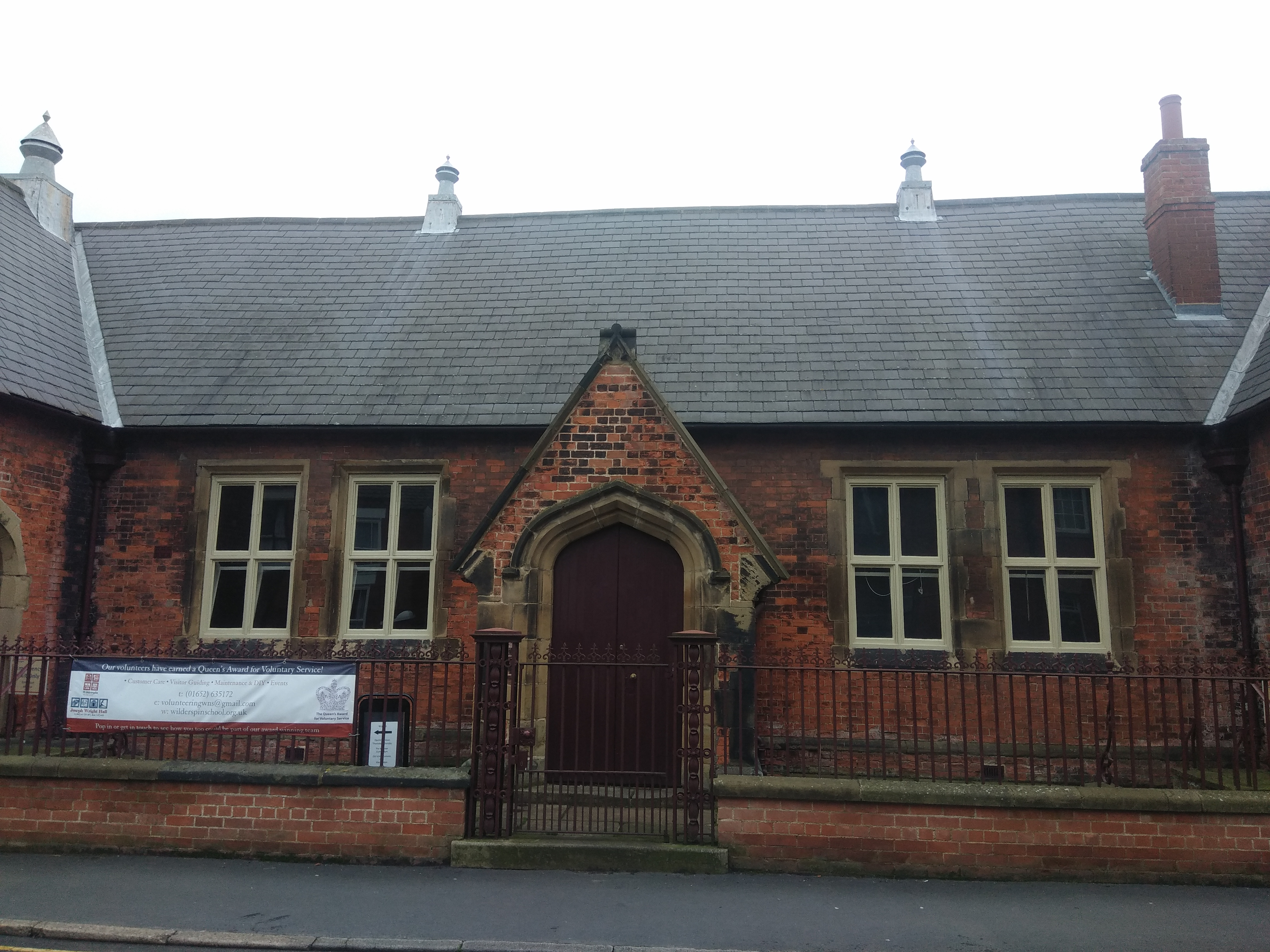
Front (centre)

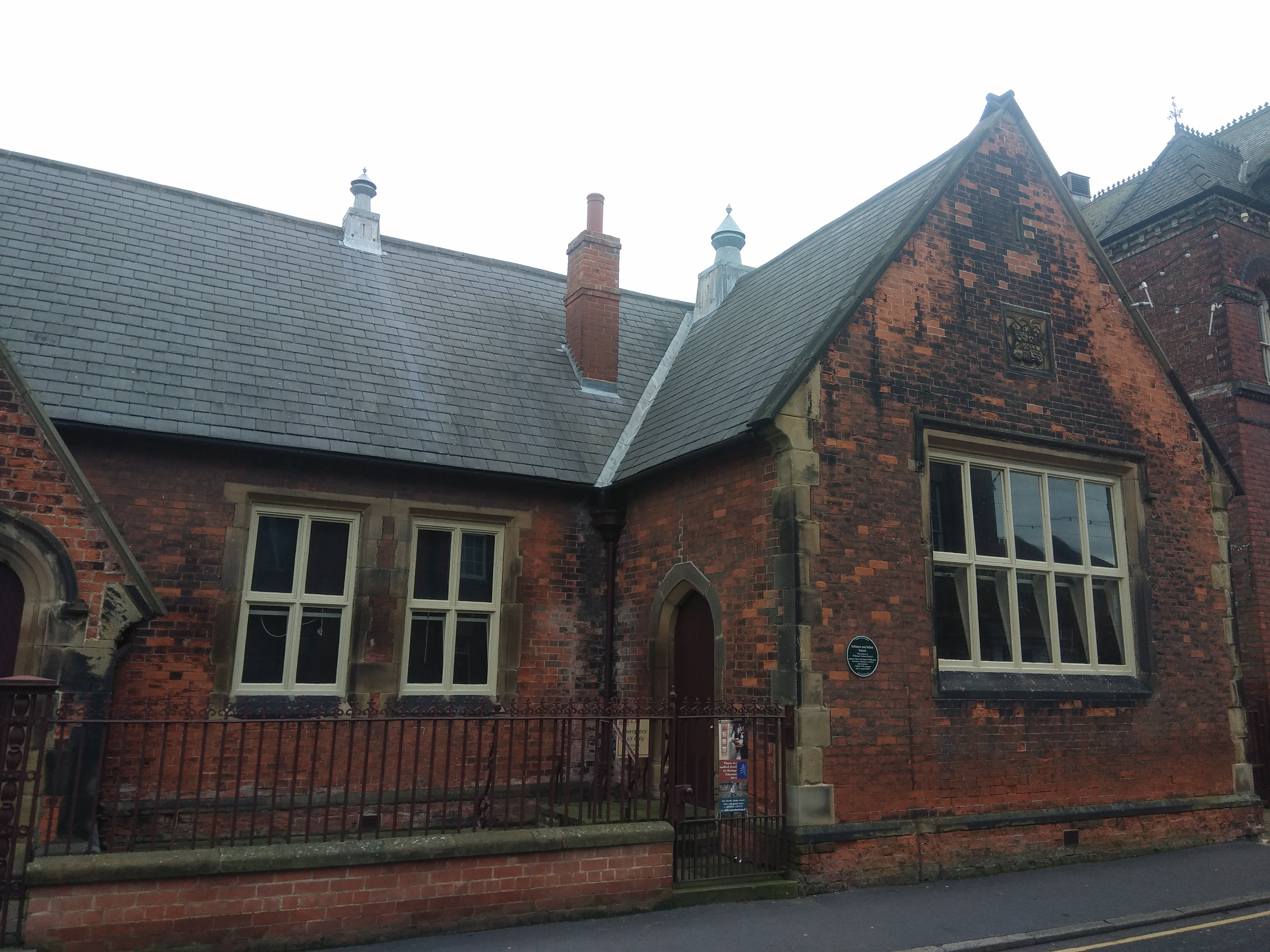
Front (right)

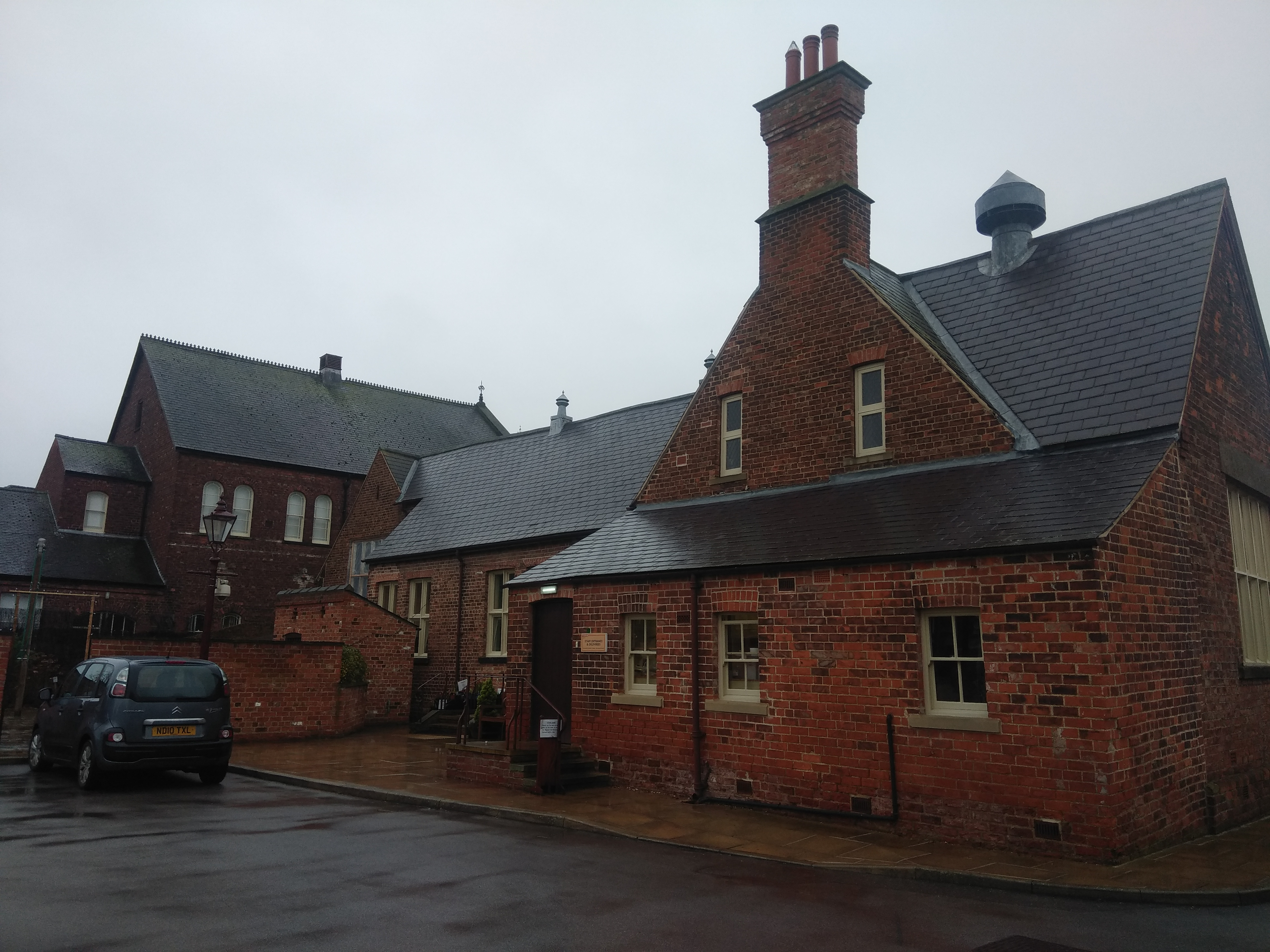
Rear

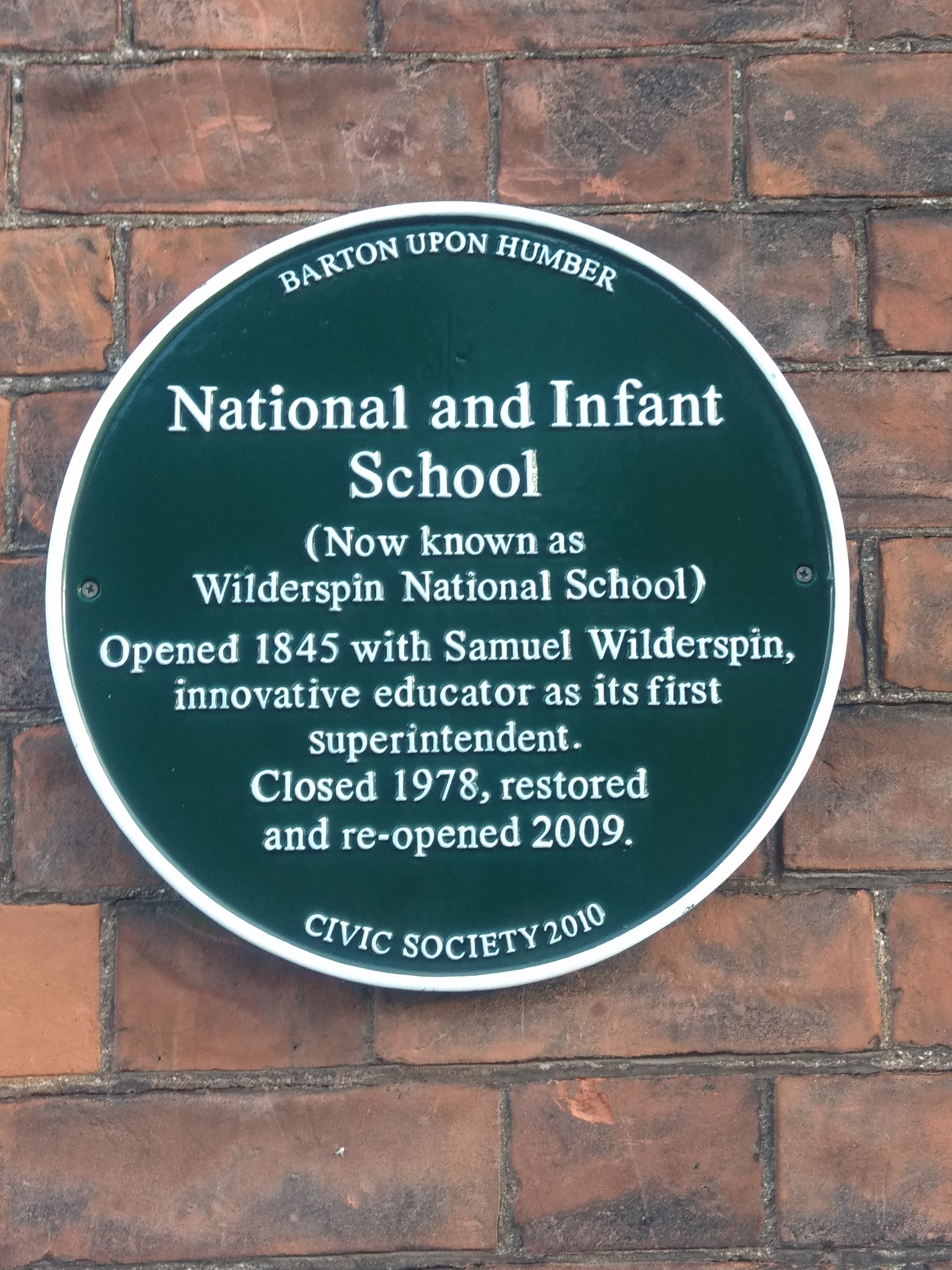
Blue plaque recording the construction and restoration of the building

== Museum ==
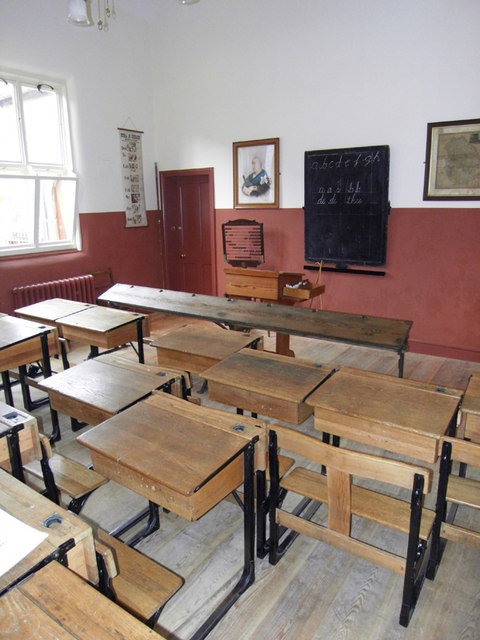
A replica Victorian classroom in the school

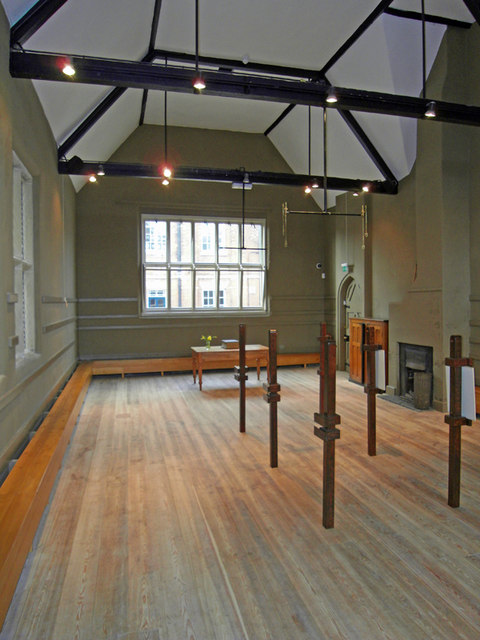
The Old schoolroom

The building closed in 1978. In 1993 the Queen Street School Preservation Trust was formed to safeguard the building from further deterioration.

It reopened as a museum in January 2009 following funding from the Heritage Lottery Fund (£858,500), Yorkshire Forward (£760,000), English Heritage (£198,000) WREN Ltd (£40,000), SITA Trust (£33,645) and Glanford Building Buildings Preservation Trust (£10,000).

Since reopening in 2009 the Museum has had over 85,000 visitors and 40,000 people have used its conference facilities. Over 22,000 pupils have been involved with its schools education programme.

=== Awards ===
The Museum has been a recipient of a Sandford Award for heritage education.

In May 2017, the school was listed as one of the ten 'best things to visit in North Lincolnshire' in a poll by the Scunthorpe Telegraph.

The Queen Street School Preservation Trust, which runs the school, received the Queen's Award for Voluntary Service in June 2018 for saving and restoring the Model Infant School and providing museum and educational services. Also in 2018, the school's Development Officer was awarded the 2018 Annual Town Award by the Barton Town Council in recognition of voluntary services to Barton-upon-Humber.
