= Margaret Elizabeth Sidell =

British teacher and local councillor

Margaret Elizabeth Sidell BEM (b. 1947) is a British teacher and local councillor.

== Biography ==
Margaret trained as a teacher in Durham before returning to Barton-upon-Humber in 1969. She served as a governor of Baysgarth School from 1983 to 1997 and of Bowmandale Primary School from 2001 to 2009. From 1987 to 1996 Margaret represented Goxhill on Glanford District Council and from 1999 to 2011 she served as a councillor on the North Lincolnshire Council and Barton Town Council. Like her mother before her, Margaret served a term as Mayor of Barton Council (2007-2008).

Margaret co-founded the Barton Food Bank and acts as its chairperson.

Margaret was awarded the British Empire Medal in the 2022 New Year Honours for services to the community in Barton-upon-Humber, particularly during the COVID-19 pandemic in England.
