= Robert Elmer Kleason =

American convict (1934–2003)

Robert Elmer Kleasen
- Born: September 20, 1934; Buffalo, New York, United States
- Died: April 21, 2003 (aged 68); Belmarsh Prison, London, England
- Criminal penalty: Murder conviction (overturned), gun violations

Robert Elmer Kleasen (September 20, 1934 – April 21, 2003) was an American who was convicted and sentenced to death in 1975 for the murder of two missionaries from The Church of Jesus Christ of Latter-day Saints, near Austin, Texas. The murders have popularly, albeit inaccurately, been cited as an inspiration for the horror film The Texas Chain Saw Massacre.

Kleasen's conviction was later overturned and Kleasen immigrated to the United Kingdom, where he remarried and was eventually imprisoned on gun violations. Kleasen died in the UK while fighting extradition back to the US for retrial on the murder charges.

== Early life ==
Robert Elmer Kleasen was born on September 20, 1934, in Buffalo, New York. He was the only child of a store clerk and his wife. Guns and hunting were a passion of the boy as well as his mentally ill father.

In 1950, 16-year-old Kleasen stepped on a rusty nail while hunting in the woods and his mother took him to the hospital. While waiting impatiently for doctors to see him, he hit his mother, got a gun from her car, and returned to the emergency room shooting. No one was hurt, but the outburst landed him in a psychiatric facility until 1952. In 1971, a year after gaining a sociology degree, he shot Dennis Dubois in the foot on Brasser Road in the town of Williamson, NY during a dispute. He later jumped bail in the state and moved to Texas.

== Texas ==
Upon arrival in Austin, Texas, Kleasen made a multitude of wild claims to his acquaintances, most notably that he was a Korean War veteran and former CIA operative. He also used several aliases, at least one of which has been speculated to have been a dissociated personality.

Kleasen was baptized into a local congregation of the Church of Jesus Christ of Latter-day Saints. In December 1973, he was arrested for theft of bison, becoming angered when the church did not send a lawyer to get him out of jail. After his release, members of Kleasen's church became increasingly uneasy with his behavior. Two Mormon missionaries, Gary Darley (20) of Simi Valley, California, and Mark Fischer (19) of Milwaukee, Wisconsin, routinely visited Kleasen, who lived in a trailer behind a taxidermist's shop in Oak Hill, on Austin's southwestern outskirts. Despite being warned by Kleasen's bishop to stop their visits due to Kleasen's behavior, Darley and Fischer decided to see him one final time.

On October 28, 1974, Darley and Fischer disappeared in Oak Hill. Police investigation of the disappearance led to the scenario that the missionaries were shot dead after having agreed to meet Kleasen for dinner. Police discovered Fischer's bloody watch and bullet-punctured name tag in Kleasen's trailer but bodies never were found. Investigators also discovered blood and tissue on a bandsaw in the taxidermy shop where Kleasen worked. Prosecutors at Kleasen's 1975 murder trial alleged he dismembered the victims and buried the remains. Kleasen was believed to have held a grudge against the LDS Church after he felt church members did not support him during a poaching trial.

Kleasen was convicted and sentenced to death. In 1977, after two years on the Texas death row, an appeals court overturned Kleasen's conviction, ruling that the search warrant for his home was improper and that key evidence should have been excluded. Authorities opted to not retry Kleasen.

== Immigration to the UK ==
After his release from Texas prison, Kleasen relocated to New York, where he was later imprisoned on assault charges. He lived for a time in a Buffalo, New York charity mission. He drew attention from the local media, and police had to be posted near the mission for Kleasen's protection. He only congregated with the other people living in the mission during church services prior to eating. During this time, the local Buffalo TV channels updated the story every night on their news broadcasts.

In 1990, Kleasen moved to Barton-upon-Humber, Lincolnshire, England. He married local woman Marie Longley, who he met as a pen pal while living in the US. He ingratiated himself with local residents, and began to amass a huge gun collection. A firearms license officer became suspicious of Kleasen's claims of being a decorated military veteran and CIA agent, and confirmed from U.S. military officials that Kleasen had never served in the U.S. armed forces. This information was passed on to police, resulting in a more thorough background check on Kleasen.

English authorities learned of Kleasen's U.S. murder conviction, which he had unlawfully omitted from his residency application. The investigation also uncovered several gun law violations. He was given a three-year prison term in 2000 for possession of illegal firearms and munitions and began to serve time in an English prison.

His wife found out about his criminal background and at one point, Kleasen threatened her with death if she tried to leave him. Being too scared to leave she stayed for almost a decade, only to come up with an escape plan with a close friend. His wife was briefly considered a missing person, possibly killed by Kleasen, until authorities learned she had fled her home during the investigation into his gun law violations.

== Extradition battle and death ==
In 2001, while Kleason was imprisoned in the UK on guns violations, Texas authorities began the process of extradition. DNA analysis and other forensic tools were used to obtain new evidence in the 1974 murders of Darley and Fischer, specifically by matching Darley's DNA to blood found near Kleasen's residence. Extradition was agreed in principle, subject to the UK requirement of binding assurances not to impose the death penalty. Before he could be extradited, Kleasen died at Belmarsh Prison on April 21, 2003, of heart failure. He was 68 years old.

== Media ==
Ken Driggs wrote a book about the murders, Evil Among Us: The Texas Mormon Missionary Murders. The book was published by Signature Books, a Salt Lake City, Utah company that specializes in Mormon-related topics.

Kleasen was the subject of a 2003 British documentary titled The Real Texas Chainsaw Massacre.
