= The George Hotel, Barton-upon-Humber =

The George Hotel
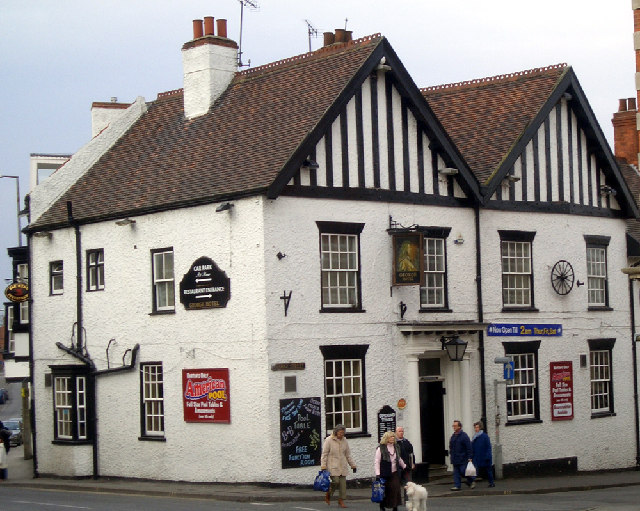
- The inn viewed from George Street

- Location within Lincolnshire
- 53.683060°N 0.43969900°W
- Location: George St, Barton-upon-Humber, North Lincolnshire, England

History
- Built: 18th century

Listed Building – Grade II
- Designated: 17 September 1976
- Reference no.: 1346800

The George Hotel is a grade II listed building and working public house in Barton-upon-Humber, North Lincolnshire, England.
