= Barton-upon-Humber =

Town in North Lincolnshire, England

Coordinates: 53.6833°N 0.4500°W

- Town and Civil Parish
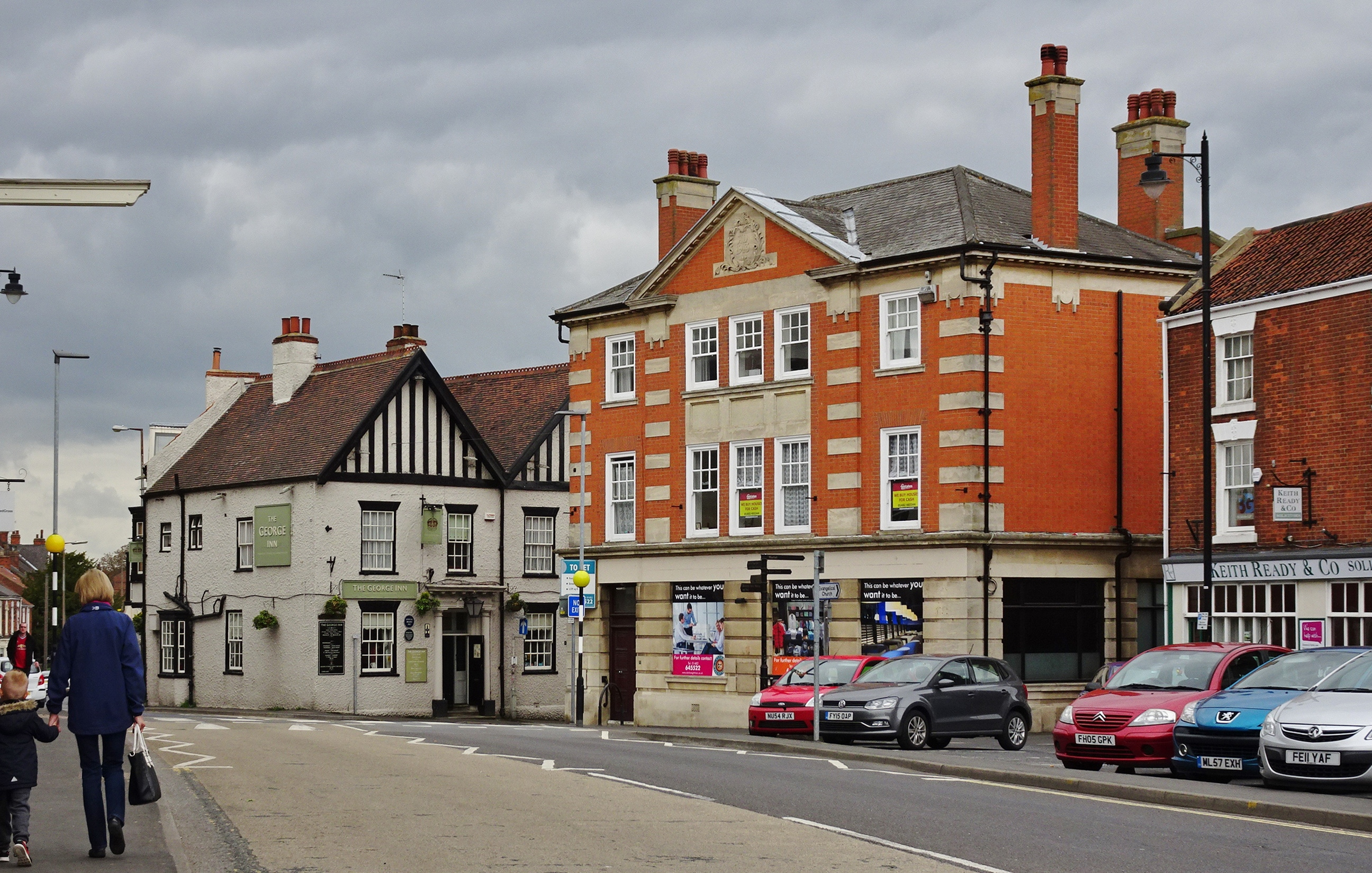
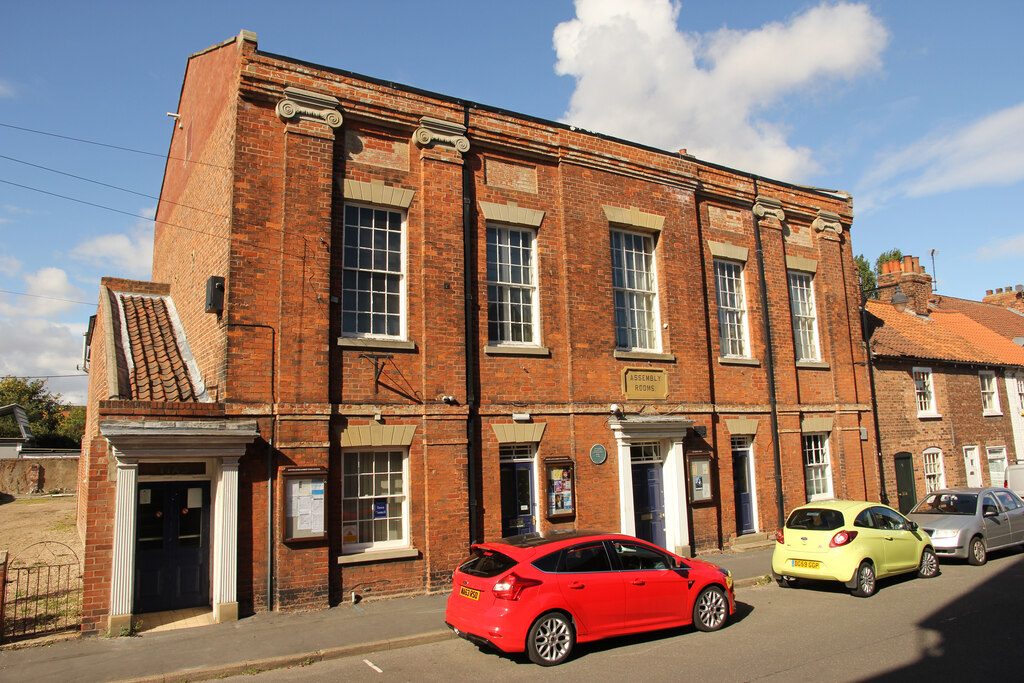
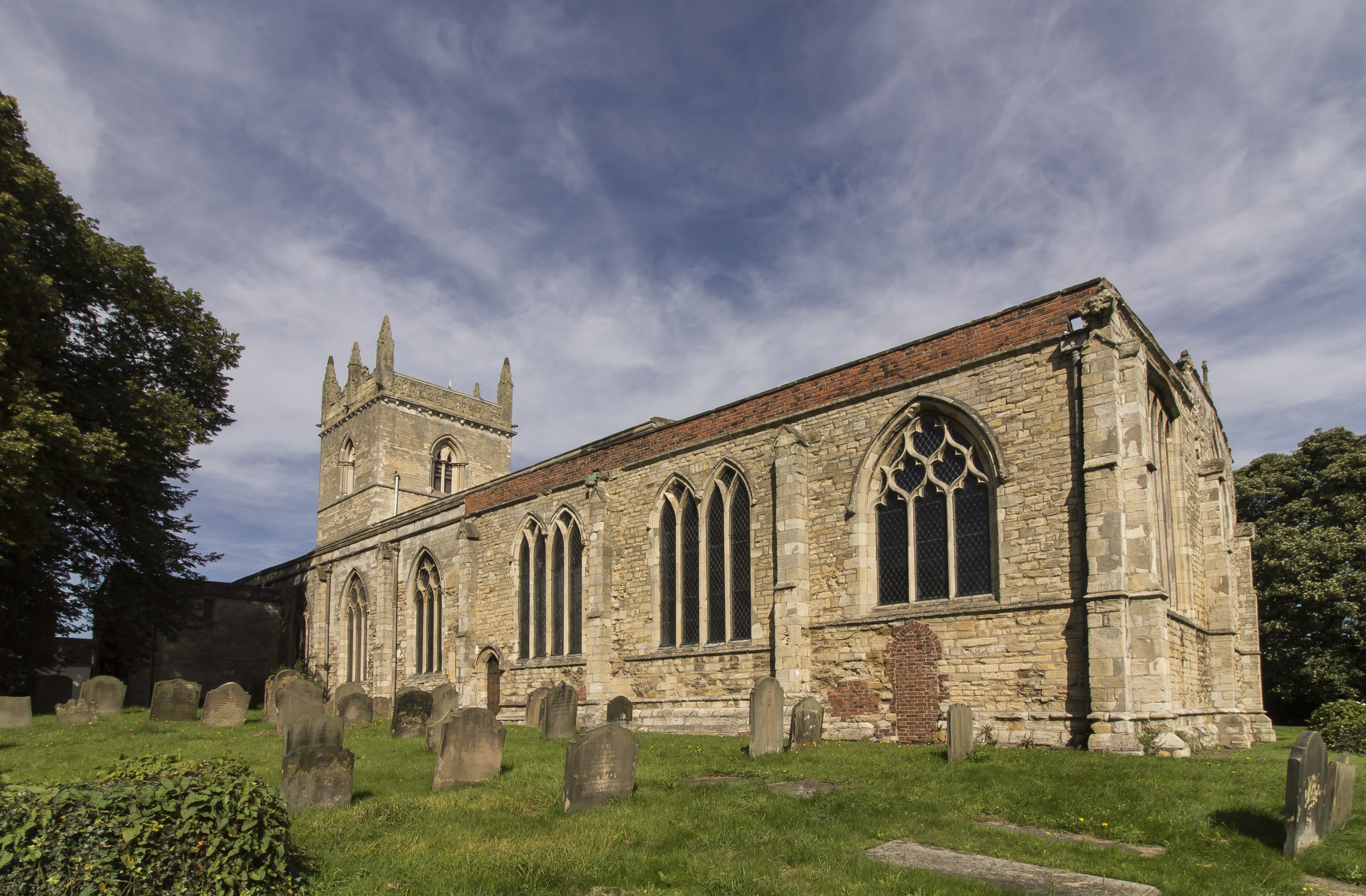
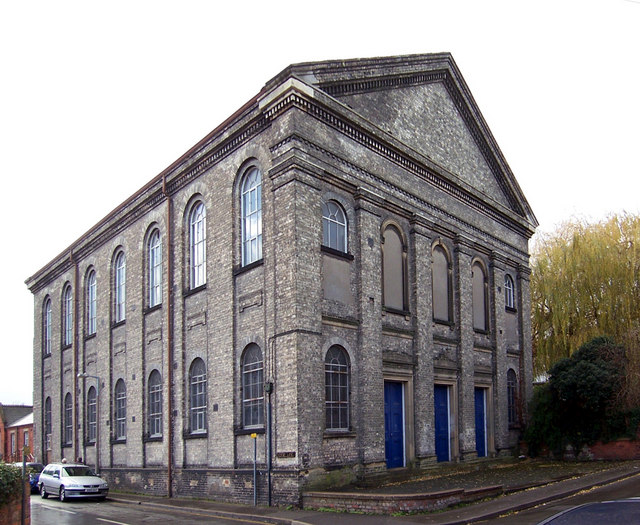
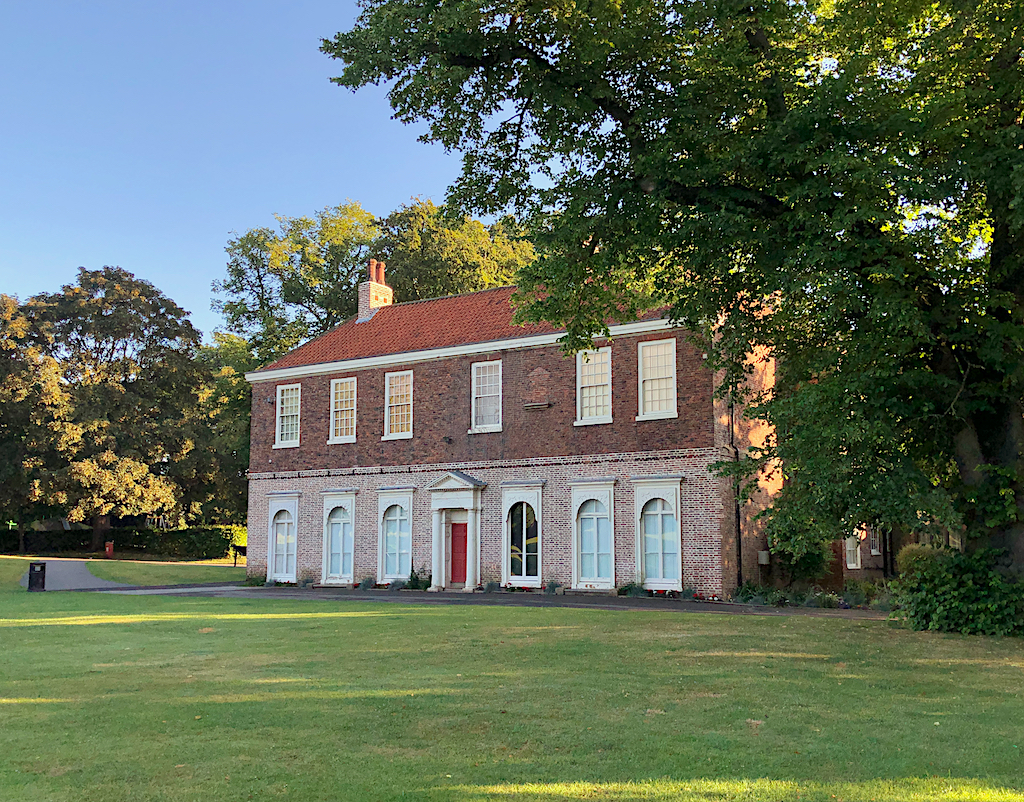
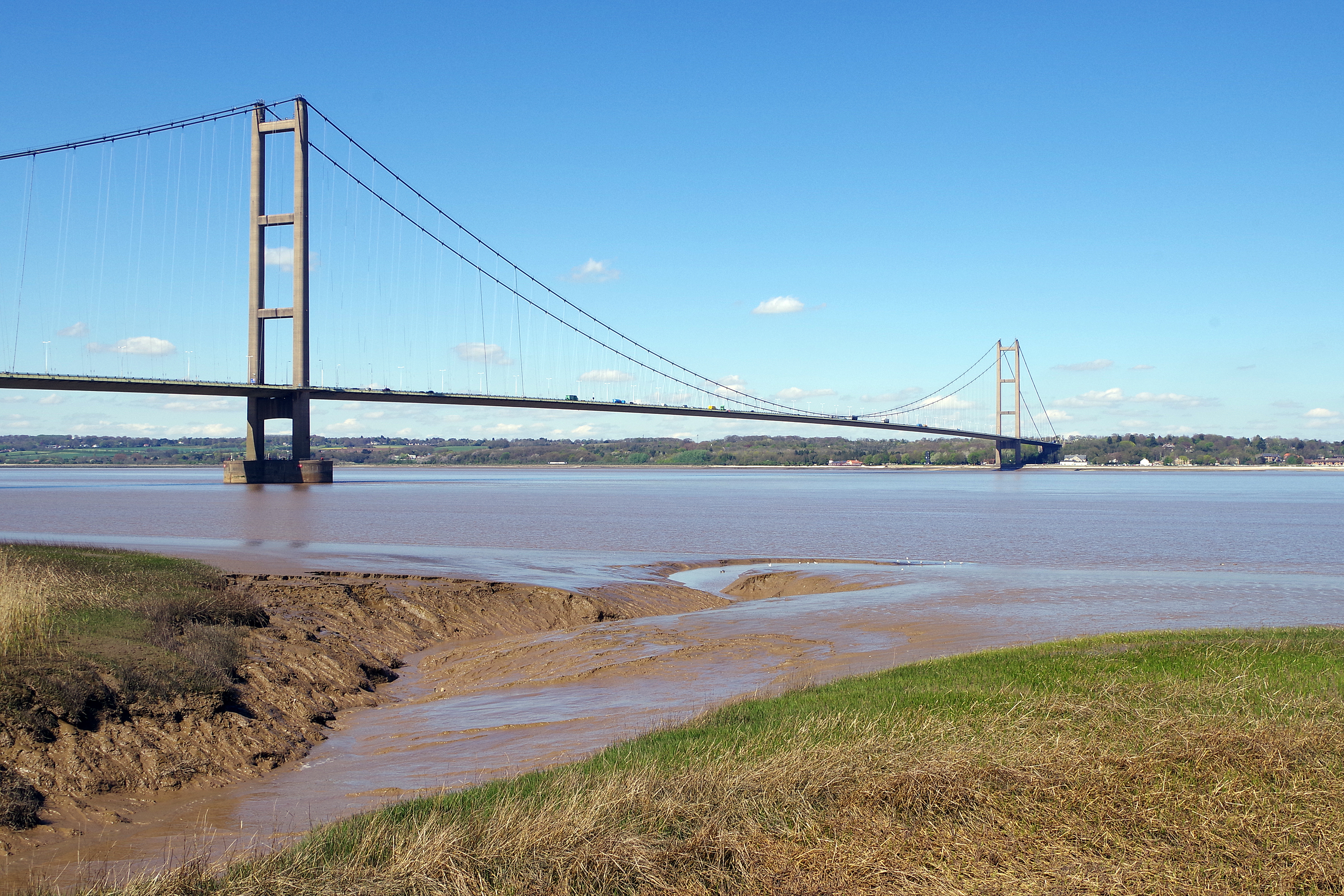
- The Marketplace The Assembly Rooms St Mary’s Church Trinity Church Baysgarth House View of the Humber Bridge from Barton

- Location within Lincolnshire
- Population: 11,066 (2011 Census)
- OS grid reference: TA030221
  - London: 150 mi (240 km) S
- Civil parish: Barton
- Unitary authority: North Lincolnshire
- Ceremonial county: Lincolnshire
- Region: Yorkshire and the Humber
- Country: England
- Sovereign state: United Kingdom
- Post town: Barton-upon-Humber
- Postcode district: DN18
- Dialling code: 01652
- Police: Humberside
- Fire: Humberside
- Ambulance: East Midlands
- UK Parliament: Brigg and Immingham

Barton-upon-Humber (/ˈbɑːrtən əˈpɒn ˈhʌmbʌr/) or Barton is a town and civil parish in the North Lincolnshire district, in the ceremonial county of Lincolnshire, England. The population at the 2011 census was 11,066. It is situated on the south bank of the Humber Estuary at the southern end of the Humber Bridge. It is 6 miles (10 km) south-west of Kingston upon Hull and 31 miles (50 km) north north-east of the county town of Lincoln. Other nearby towns include Scunthorpe to the south-west and Grimsby to the south-east.

== Geography ==
Barton is on the south bank of the Humber Estuary and is at the southern end of the Humber Bridge. The Viking Way starts near the bridge.

=== Transport connections ===
The Barton – Cleethorpes Branch Line (opened 1849) via Grimsby terminates at Barton-on-Humber railway station. The A15 passes to the west of the town cutting through Beacon Hill, and has a junction with the A1077 Ferriby Road to South Ferriby. The B1218 passes north–south through the town, and leads to Barton Waterside. Bus services provided by Stagecoach in Lincolnshire and East Yorkshire link the town with Cleethorpes, Grimsby, Scunthorpe and Hull.

== History ==
=== Prehistoric ===
Cropmarks and the discovery of polished handaxes in the area surrounding Barton-upon-Humber suggest that the area was inhabited at least as far back as the Neolithic (circa 4000 to circa 2,500 BCE).

=== Roman ===
No Roman settlement has been found in Barton-upon-Humber, though individual discoveries dating to the Roman period have been made: in 1828 a Roman cremation and an inhumation were discovered, in 1967 part of a Roman road was excavated near Bereton school (now Baysgarth school), and other finds of coins, potteries, querns, and other Roman objects have been made. The Deepdale Hoard was discovered in the vicinity in 1979.

=== Anglo-Saxon ===
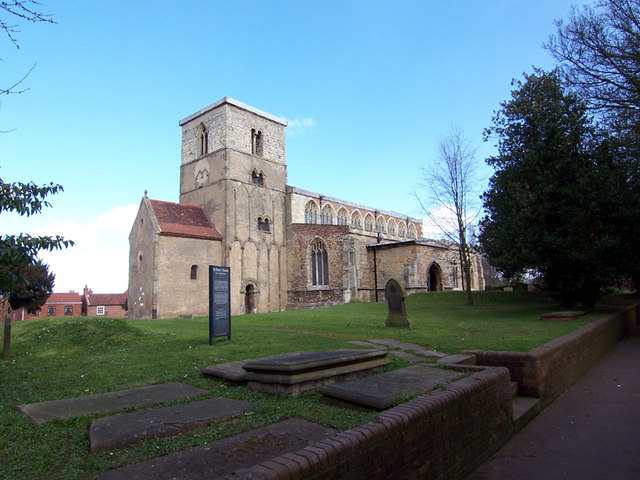
St Peter's Church, Barton-upon-Humber, now administered by English Heritage

An Anglo-Saxon inhumation cemetery was discovered at Castledyke South during the construction of air raid shelters in 1939. The cemetery, believed to have been in use from the late 5th or early 6th century until the late 7th century, was investigated and partially excavated during 1975 to 1990. The skeletal remains of 227 individuals were identified, including one who had undergone (and survived) trepanning.

The Castledyke South area has been suggested to be the site of the Battle of Brunanburh (AD 937), one of the most defining battles in the history of the British Isles. Historical sources tell of a huge fleet of warships entering the Humber led by Olaf Guthfrithsson. Olaf and a coalition force were overwhelmed in battle by King Æthelstan and his army, after which the defeated warriors and their leaders were said to have escaped in their ships.

=== Medieval ===
The name Barton derives from the Old English bere-tūn meaning a 'barley farm'.

Barton is mentioned as a medieval borough in documents dating from 1086, 1216–1272 and 1298. A ferry to Hull was first recorded in 1086. The oldest residential building in Barton is 51 Fleetgate: it dates back to 1325 with the majority of the front of the building dating to 1425. The Medieval manor in Barton was Tyrwhitt Hall which dates to at least the 15th century.

=== Churches ===
There are two medieval churches extant in Barton-upon-Humber, St Peter's and St Mary's, located only about 170 yards apart.

St Peter's is a large, mostly Anglo-Saxon church. The Church of England made it redundant in 1972, after which the remains of some 2,750 people were removed. The significance of the human remains lies in their representing the pathology of an isolated community over the period ca. 950-ca. 1850. The church was reopened in May 2007 as a resource for medical research into the development of diseases and ossuary practices. An excavation report on this, one of England's most extensively investigated parish churches, was published in 2007.

St. Peter's predates St. Mary's, which may have originated as a chapel on the original market place. St. Mary's was enlarged and increased in importance as the town's trade thrived in the 12th and 13th centuries.

=== 18th century ===
- William Hall's Barton Ropery opened in 1767.

=== 19th century ===
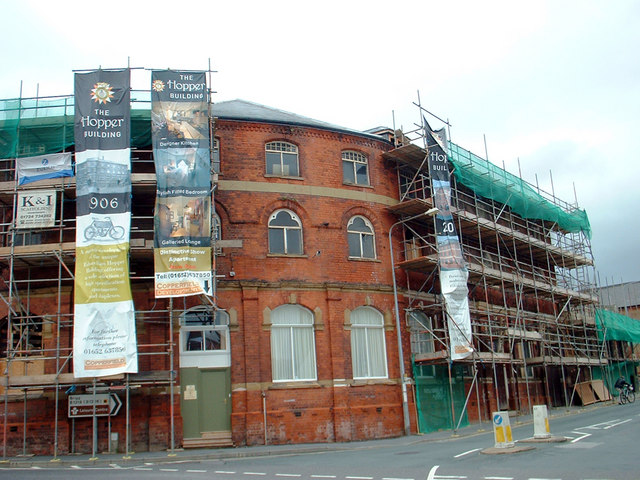
The former head office of Elswick Hopper under conversion into flats (2006)

- The United Reformed Church (originally the Providence Chapel) was opened in 1806.
- A Temperance Hall was opened in 1843 and latterly converted into the Assembly Rooms in 1906.
- The Police Station and Magistrates Court was opened in 1847.
- The Wilderspin National School opened in 1844.
- The first public train arrived in Barton-upon-Humber on 1 March 1849; this fact is commemorated by a blue plaque at the modern railway station.
- The Corn Exchange, which was later converted into a private club, opened in 1854.
- The Trinity Methodist Church was built in 1860–1861.
- The Oddfellow's Hall was constructed in 1864. It latterly served as Barton's first cinema, a roller skating rink, a dance hall during the Second World War, and as offices and private accommodations.
- What is now the Salvation Army Citadel was first opened as a Primitive Methodist Chapel in 1867.
- In 1880 Fred Hopper started a bicycle repair business in a former blacksmith's shop in the town. He soon began manufacturing bicycles, and after buying the Elswick Cycle Company of Newcastle, Northumberland in 1910, developed the renamed Elswick Hopper into a major manufacturer.

=== 20th century ===
- The war memorial records the deaths of 165 men from Barton who died fighting in the First World War. The memorial was unveiled on 3 April 1921 and is a Grade II listed structure.
- A further 48 men and women who died fighting in the Second World War are also recorded on the memorial.
- In 1922 the Oxford Picture Theatre opened on Newport. It was subsequently renamed as the 'Oxford Cinema', and closed in 1966. The building has since been used as a bingo hall and sports centre.
- The Star Theatre was opened on Fleetgate around 1934. By 1953 it had been renamed the Star cinema. It closed in June 1957 and was subsequently demolished.

== Education ==
Baysgarth School, on Barrow Road, is a comprehensive school for ages 11–16. There are also three primary schools: St Peter's Church of England, on Marsh Lane; the Castledyke Primary School (formerly Barton County School), on the B1218; and Bowmandale Primary School, in the south of the town.

Barton Grammar School, which opened in 1931, used to be on Caistor Road. Henry Treece, the poet and author, was a teacher at the grammar school.

== Industry ==
The clay pits on the Humber foreshore were the focus of a tile and cement industry from 1850 to 1959. The industrial sites were abandoned in the early 20th century once supplies of clay began to run out. The clay workings filled with water and became colonised by species of reeds. The reserve was acquired by Lincolnshire Wildlife Trust in 1983, who opened it as Far Ings National Nature Reserve in the same year.

For 20 years, Barton-upon-Humber was home to a 750,000 square feet (70,000 m^{2}) site for Kimberly-Clark. The site closed in March 2013 and more than 200 jobs were lost. Wren Kitchens bought the site and moved to a new head office, 'The Nest', on the site, initially employing 429 people. Wren extended the site in 2016, creating an additional 600 jobs. In 2019 Wren announced successful plans to build a £120million extension to the site. The new site was expected to employ an additional 535 people.

=== Windmills ===
Market Place Mill, January 2009

Barton-upon-Humber has had a number of windmills, two of which survive. They were all tower mills and were either corn or whiting mills.

- Caistor Road Mill was working in 1953.. It was dismantled in the 1960s. The tower was demolished between 1978 and 1983.
- Ferriby Road Mill was standing in 1923, driven by engine. It was demolished in 1934.
- Hewson's Mill was built in 1813. It worked by wind until the First World War, then by engine into the 1920s. After standing derelict for many years, planning permission for conversion to residential use was granted in October 2021.
- King's Garth, Kirkby's or Market Place Mill was built in 1810, replacing an earlier mill on the same site. It had six sails. Built as a whiting mill, it was also a corn mill by 1815. It worked by wind until 1868, then by gas engine into the 1950s. A proposal to demolish the mill in 1985 was refused following a public enquiry. The mill had been converted into a public house by 2005.
- Milson's Mill was standing c. 1870. It worked by wind until 1878 and was then worked by engine until 1920. The mill was demolished in 1934.
- Sisson's Mill was a whiting mill. It was demolished in 1946.

== Culture ==
=== Events ===
An annual 'Bike night', a social event in the town celebrating motorcycles, has been held since 1997. An annual arts festival has been held in Barton-upon-Humber since 1998.

=== Museums ===
Since 1981, there has been a local history museum based in Baysgarth House, within Baysgarth Park. In 2009, the Wilderspin National School museum opened following a £1.9 million funding investment. The school focuses on the life and works of Samuel Wilderspin. In September 2020 an archive and exhibition centre dedicated to Ted Lewis was opened on Ferriby Road.

=== Public houses ===
Barton-upon-Humber has at least seven extant public houses, including The Volunteer Arms, The George Hotel, and The Wheatsheaf. At least thirteen former public houses have been recorded from Barton, including the Steam Packet (on Fleetgate) which was demolished in 1848 in advance of the new railway here, and the Whitecross Tavern which closed in 1926. Former pubs which have recently closed and since been redeveloped include The Blue Bell, which was redeveloped in 2016 into a housing complex named Blue Bell Court, and the Carnival Inn, which was demolished in 2013.

=== Local media ===
Regional TV news is provided by BBC Yorkshire and Lincolnshire and ITV Yorkshire. Television signals are received from the Belmont TV transmitter.

Local radio stations are BBC Radio Humberside, Greatest Hits Radio East Yorkshire & Northern Lincolnshire, Hits Radio East Yorkshire & North Lincolnshire, Nation Radio East Yorkshire, Capital Yorkshire and Barton FM, a community based radio station.

Barton-upon-Humber is served by the weekly local newspaper, Grimsby Telegraph.

== Notable people ==
Notable people associated with Barton-upon-Humber
Name	Image	Occupation	Dates	Barton status	Comments	Reference
Frank Barton		Footballer	b. 1947	Born in Barton-upon-Humber		
Nancy Birtwhistle		Chef		Resident of Barton-upon-Humber	Winner of BBC TV show The Great British Bake Off	
Marjorie Boulton		Author and poet	1924–2017	Educated in Barton-upon-Humber		
Robert Brown		Solicitor, Classicist, and local historian	1844–1912	Born in and resident of Barton-upon-Humber		
Jamie Cann		Politician	1946–2001	Born in Barton-upon-Humber	MP for Ipswich	
Janet E. Courtney		Writer and scholar	1865–1954	Born in Barton-upon-Humber	Writer and editor for the Encyclopædia Britannica. appointed an OBE and served as a Justice of the peace	
Francis John French		Local historian and civil servant	b. 1941		Awarded MBE in the 2002 New Year Honours	
Ken H. Harrison		Comic book artist	b. 1940		Drew Desperate Dan for the Dandy	
David George Hogarth		Archaeologist	1862–1927	Born in Barton-upon-Humber	Keeper of the Ashmolean Museum, Oxford from 1909 to 1927	
William Holyman		Shipping magnate	1833–1919	Born in Barton-upon-Humber		
Thomas Johnson		Botanist and teacher	1863–1954	Born in Barton-upon-Humber	Fellow of the Linnean Society	
Robert Elmer Kleason		Criminal	1934–2003	Resident of Barton-upon-Humber from 1990	American citizen who was convicted and sentenced to death in 1975 for the murder of two Mormon missionaries near Austin, Texas	
Ted Lewis		Author	1940–1982	Resident of Barton-upon-Humber after c.1945	Lewis's best known work was adapted as the film Get Carter	
David Mason		Royal Marine and teacher		Educated in Barton-upon-Humber 1986–1991	Awarded MBE in the 2021 New Year Honours	
George Messo		Poet & Translator	b. 1969	Born in New Holland. Resident of Barton-upon-Humber.	Award winning poet and translator. Fellow of the Royal Asiatic Society and the Royal Society of Arts.	
Paddy Mills		Footballer	1900–1994	Grew up in Barton-upon-Humber		
Philip Pape		Sculptor and stonemason	1910–1982	Resident in Barton-upon-Humber from 1913. Lived in Tyrwhitt Hall 1960–1982.		
Isaac Pitman		Teacher	1813–1897	Resident and teacher in Barton-upon-Humber c. 1831 – 1835	Inventor of the Pitman shorthand method	
Peter D. Robinson		Bishop	b. 1969	Grew up in Barton-upon-Humber	Presiding Bishop of the United Episcopal Church of North America	
Christian Sansam		Footballer	b. 1975	Resident of Barton-upon-Humber	Played in the Football League for Scunthorpe United, Scarborough, Bradford City and Hull City, and in Singapore for Woodlands Wellington.	
William Shaw		Priest	18th Century	Born in Barton-upon-Humber	Founded Barton, Maryland, USA, in 1794	
Margaret Sidell		Local councillor		Resident of Barton-upon-Humber	Awarded the British Empire Medal in the 2022 New Year Honours for services to the local community of Barton.	
Gilbert Sissons		Priest	1870–1940	Born in Barton-upon-Humber	Archdeacon of Gibraltar from 1916 to 1929 and of Italy and the French Riviera from 1929 to 1934	
Robert Wright Taylor		Solicitor	1859-?	Resident of Barton-upon-Humber	Fellow of the Society of Antiquaries of London. Owned and lived in Baysgarth House.	
Henry Treece		Poet and writer	1911–1966	Resident of Barton-upon-Humber		
Chad Varah		Priest	1911–2007	Born in Barton-upon-Humber	Founder of the Samaritans and named after St Chad's Church on Waterside Road	
Samuel Wilderspin		Educator	1791–1866	Teacher in Barton-upon-Humber	Pioneer of infant education.	
Vanessa Winship		Photographer	b. 1960	Born in Barton-upon-Humber	Winner of two World Press Photo Awards	
Wendy Witter		Councillor	1936-2024	Resident of Barton-upon-Humber	Awarded MBE in the 1992 New Year Honours	

== See also ==
- Barton, Maryland, United States - Settled by the Barton-upon-Humber minister William Shaw.
- Humber Ferry
