= Samuel Wilderspin =

British educator (1791–1866)

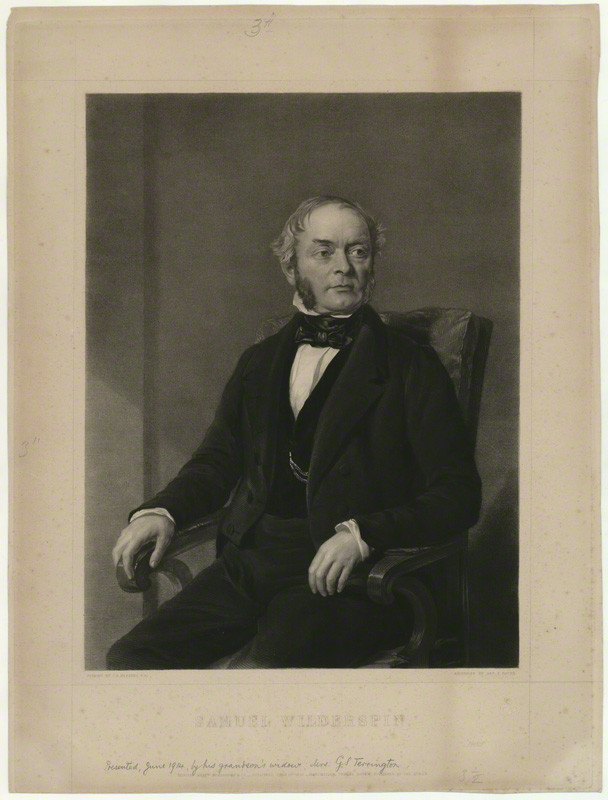
Samuel Wilderspin, 1848 engraving after John Rogers Herbert

Samuel Wilderspin (23 March 1791, in Hornsey, Wakefield – 1866) was an English educator known for his pioneering work on infant schools. His belief was that a child should be encouraged to learn through experience, and to development in feelings as well as intellect. His work provided the model for infant schools in Europe and North America.

== Life ==
Wilderspin was born an only child in the district of Hornsey, London. Born into a Christian home, Wilderspin claimed he acknowledged the existence of a superior being "a Maker, a Governor, and Protector of this world", not because of his parents but due to his own observation and intuition. Wilderspin was homeschooled most of his childhood, as he claimed his parents taught him everything and gave him a foundation he truly appreciated though he also claimed to have "thrown much on my resources, early became a thinker, and contriver too". At the age of seven, his parents encouraged him to attend the public school system of education, subsequently encouraging him to withdraw. Wilderspin was destined for business, however a series of events led him to teaching and furthermore initiating a system of teaching. (The Infant System – Samuel Wilderspin).

Wilderspin was apprenticed as a clerk in the City of London, but later trained in infant education. Through a New Jerusalem Church in south London, he met James Buchanan, an Owenite who had recently set up an infant school at Brewer's Green in Westminster. With his wife Sarah Anne, Wilderspin ran an infant school in Spitalfields, London, from 1820. This school particularly impressed David Stow, who invited Wilderspin to Glasgow to lecture on it.

Wilderspin published On the Importance of Educating the Infant Poor in 1823, based on his experiences in Spitalfields. He began working for the Infant School Society the next year, informing others about his views on education. It folded in 1828, but Wilderspin continued to propagate his views nationally.

== Views ==
The ideas current at this time on infant education went back to J. F. Oberlin and Robert Owen. Wilderspin's approach to schooling as necessary for a socially and morally prepared child was informed by his Swedenborgianism.

When posed with the question "how came you to think of the Infant School Teaching System?" Wilderspin would simply respond "circumstances forced me to it". Wilderspin claimed that existing infant schools were "simply dame-schools, with the hornbook for boys and girls, and perhaps a little sewing for the latter" (The Infant System – Wilderspin). Wilderspin believed that the first seven years of a child are his/her golden years - these are the most important years of a child to build a foundation, and vehemently admonished parents and teachers likewise to appeal to their senses.

Wilderspin developed four (4) rules in teaching infants:

First – to feed the child's faculties with suitable food.

Second – to simplify and explain everything, so as to adapt it properly to those faculties.

Third – not to overdo anything, either by giving too much instruction, or instruction beyond their years, and thus over-excite the brain, and injure the faculties.

Fourth – blend both exercise and amusement with instruction at due intervals, which is readily effected by a moderate amount of singing, alternating with the usual motions and evolutions in the schoolroom, and the unfettered freedom of the play-ground.

Play was an important part of Wilderspin's system of education, and he is credited with the invention of the playground. He also ran a company supplying apparatus for playground activities.

== Works ==
Wilderspin wrote:

- On the Importance of educating the Infant Poor, 2nd ed. London, 1824; a third edition appeared in 1825 as Infant Education.
- Early Discipline illustrated, London, 1832; 3rd ed. 1840.
- A System for the Education for the Young, London, 1840.
- A Manual for the Instruction of Young Children (with Thomas John Terrington), London and Hull, 1845.
- The Infant System for Developing, &c. (in this he calls himself "inventor of the system of infant training"), 8th ed. London, 1852.

Samuel Wilderspin wrote "The Infant System, for developing the physical, intellectual, and moral powers off all children from 1 to seven years of age".

== Legacy ==
Around two thousand (2000) schools were founded by Wilderspin throughout the United Kingdom (Report from the Select Committee of Education in England and Wales, P.P. (1835) VII p13). However, Queen Street School in Barton-upon-Humber is the only known surviving school built to his designs. It was completed in 1845, and Wilderspin himself taught at the school for several years before retiring in 1848.

His papers are in Senate House Library, University of London.

== Notes ==
Attribution

This article incorporates text from a publication now in the public domain: Lee, Sidney, ed. (1900). "Wilderspin, Samuel". Dictionary of National Biography. Vol. 61. London: Smith, Elder & Co.
