= Assembly Rooms Cinema Hall =

- Interactive map of Assembly Rooms Cinema Hall
- Address: Garden Road, Near Government Botanical Gardens; Ooty; India
- Coordinates: 11.41484°N 76.70829°E
- Owner: Government of Tamil Nadu

Construction
- Opened: 1901
- Years active: 1901 - Present

The Assembly Rooms Cinema Hall (also known as Assembly Rooms Theatre and Assembly Rooms Talkies) is a cinema hall in Ooty, Tamil Nadu. It is located by the Garden Road (the road joining Charring cross to the Government Botanical Gardens, Ooty). The theatre is one of the oldest in the region, being established over a century ago.

== Operation ==
The theatre was established in 1901. It is owned by the government and is run by the government under a trust.

It is noted to show mostly English language films. It was shut down in 2011 and re-opened on 26 November 2015 after renovations.

== See also ==
- Government Rose Garden, Ooty
- Adam's fountain
- Stone House, Ooty
- Ooty Golf Course
