= Barton-upon-Humber Assembly Rooms =

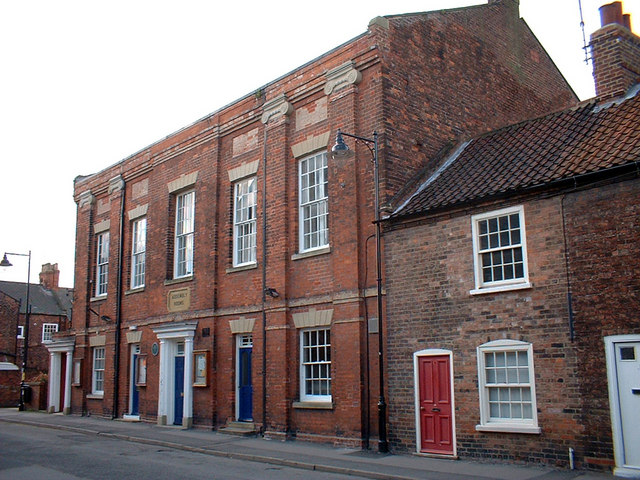
- The Assembly Rooms, Barton-Upon-Humber

- Location in Lincolnshire
- 53.68508°N 0.43985°W
- Location: Queen Street, Barton-upon-Humber, North Lincolnshire, DN18 5QP
- OS grid reference: TA 0315 2206

History
- Built: 1843 (as a Temperance Hall)
- Built for: Temperance Society

Listed Building – Grade II
- Designated: 28 June 1984
- Reference no.: 1346843

The Barton-upon-Humber Assembly Rooms is a Grade II listed building in Barton-upon-Humber, North Lincolnshire, opened in 1843 as a Temperance Hall.

== Architecture ==
The building is two storeys in height and is built from local, red bricks capped with a Welsh slate roof. On the Queen's street frontage it has a central 6-panel door under an oblong fanlight within a pilastered doorcase with projecting cornice. This main entrance is flanked by two additional doorways, each a 4-panel door beneath an oblong fanlight. There are sashed windows with sixteen panes on the ground floor and twenty-four panes on the first floor. Each window has a channelled and cambered stone lintel with a larger central keystone. Above the first floor windows are recessed brick panels. At the top of this frontage, there is a stepped brick cornice. A stone plaque above the main door is carved with the words 'Assembly Rooms'. To the left of this is a blue plaque recording its construction as a Temperance Hall in 1843.

== History and use ==
The building was constructed in 1843 as a Temperance Hall at a cost of £700 following the formation of a Temperance Society in Barton in 1837. In 1903 the building was closed and offered for sale. In it was re-opened as the Assembly Rooms.

It is currently used as the offices for Barton Town Council.

== Gallery ==
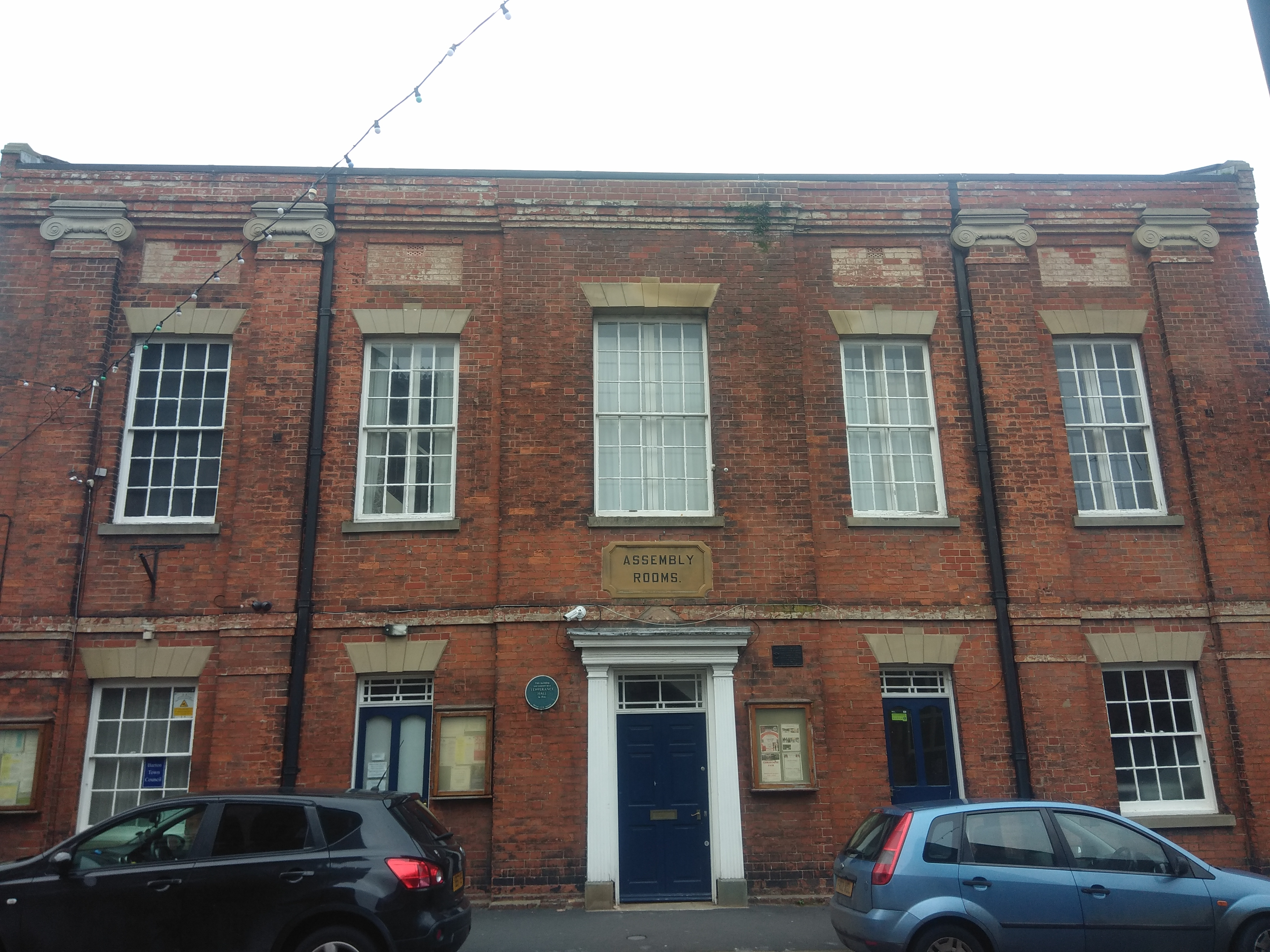
Front elevation

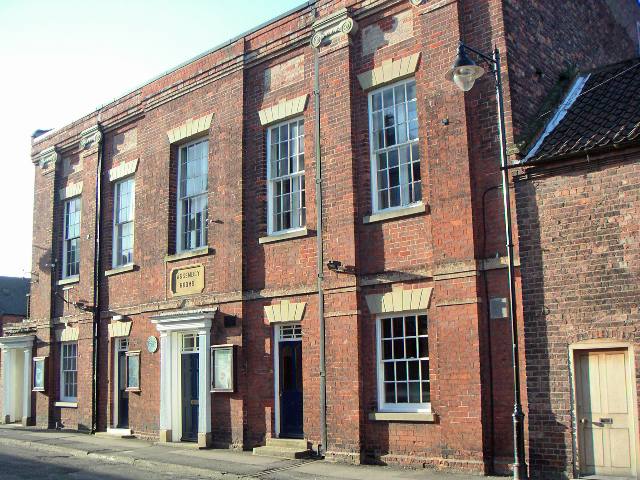

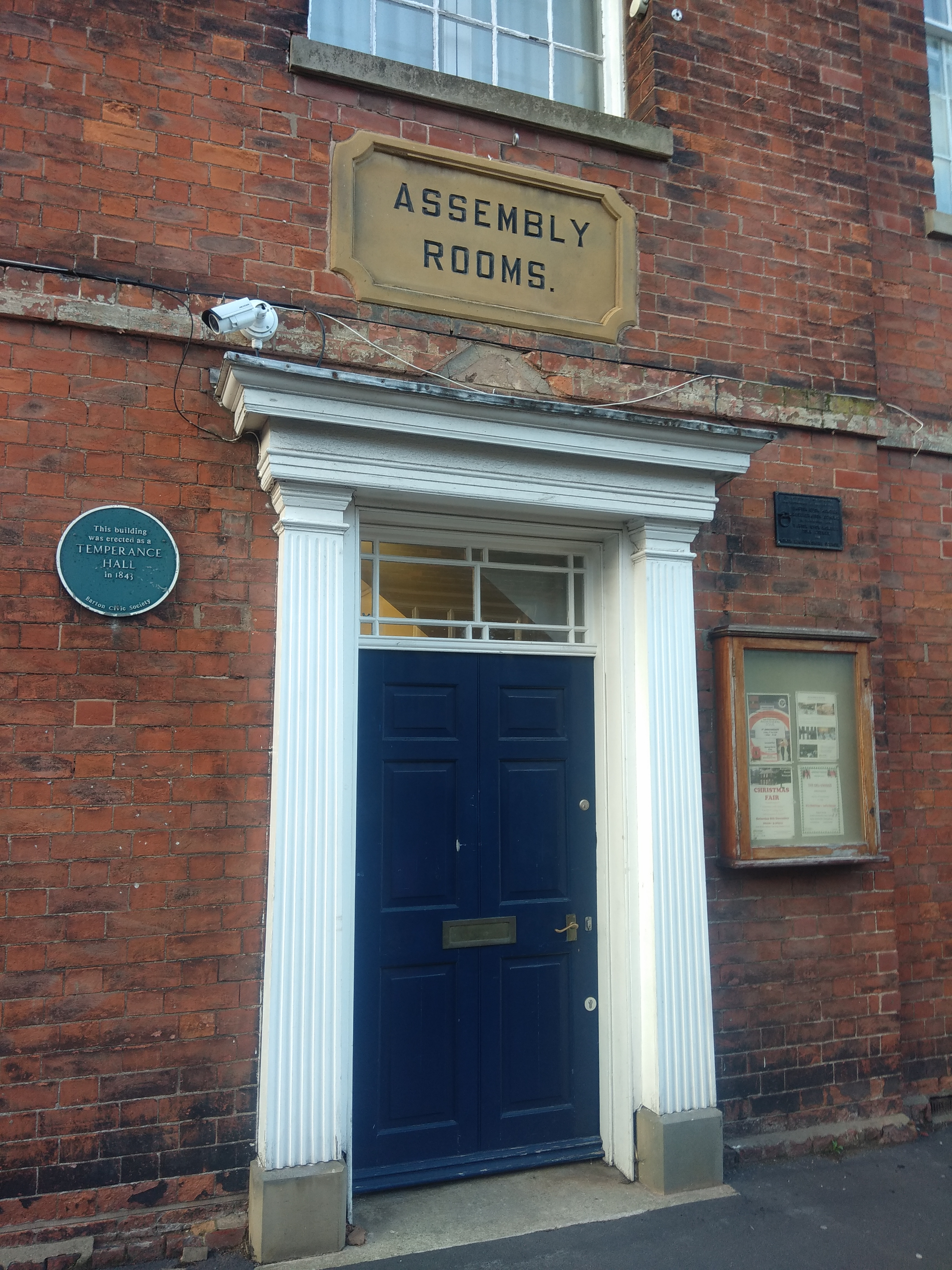
Door detail

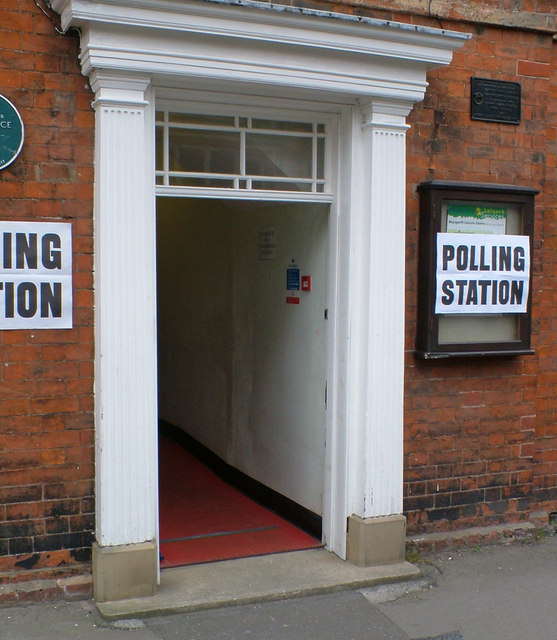
Use as a polling station (2007)
