= Ropewalk, Barton-upon-Humber =

The Ropewalk
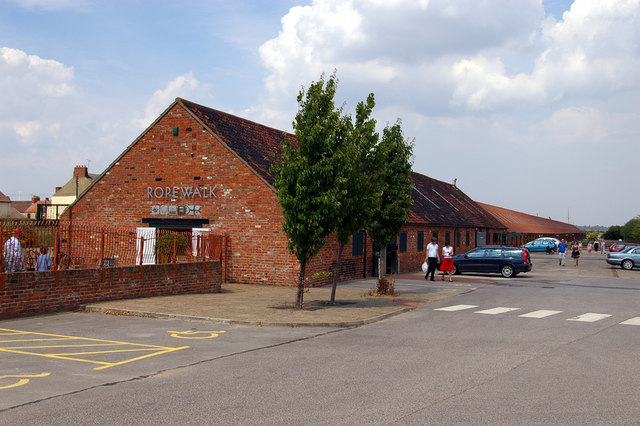

- Location in Lincolnshire
- 53.69296°N 0.44291°W
- Location: Maltkiln Road, Barton-upon-Humber, North Lincolnshire, United Kingdom
- OS grid reference: TA 02914 22945

History
- Built: 1767
- Built for: Hall's Barton Ropery
- Rebuilt: 1921

Listed Building – Grade II
- Designated: 17 September 1976
- Reference no.: 1346819

The Ropewalk, originally Halls' Barton Ropery is a former ropewalk in Barton-upon-Humber, North Lincolnshire, first built in 1767. It is a Grade II Listed building and currently operates as a regional centre for the arts.

== History ==
The building was constructed in 1767, by William Hall, with the north half (now the Ropery Hall) rebuilt in 1921. The ropery was in production through both world wars and the great depression. It was taken over by Bridport-Gundry Ltd in 1986 and later British Ropes in the summer of 1989, closing on 18 December 1989.

== Arts venue ==
Ropery Hall is a community performance venue for live music, theatre and cinema. Other facilities include a printmaking workshop, artists' studios, meeting rooms and a picture-framing department. The main galleries feature changing exhibitions. Ropewalk Museum is also located in the facility. Its exhibits focus on the history of the factory and its employees.
