= United Reformed Church, Barton-upon-Humber =

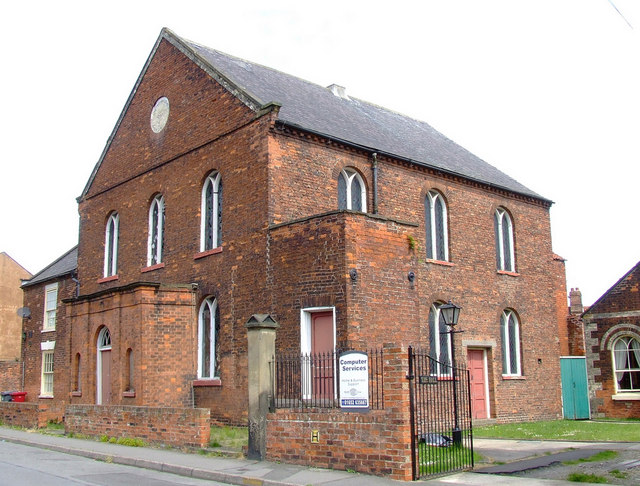

- Location in Lincolnshire
- 53.684662°N 0.44182195°W
- Location: Chapel Lane, Barton-upon-Humber, North Lincolnshire, DN18 5PJ, England
- OS grid reference: TA 03005 22039

History
- Built: 1806

Site notes
- Architectural style: Georgian style

Listed Building – Grade II*
- Designated: 21 September 1966
- Reference no.: 1051598

The United Reformed Church (formerly the Providence Chapel) is a 19th-century church and a Grade II* Listed building in Barton-upon-Humber, North Lincolnshire, England. It is the oldest surviving Independent chapel in Lincolnshire.

== Architecture ==
The church and its associated manse is constructed of locally made red brick. It is a two-storey building with a gabled roof. The roof is tiled in Welsh slate and pantiles. A circular panel in the front elevation is inscribed 'Providence Chapel 1806', over which it is painted 'United Reformed Church'. A flat-roofed porch was added in 1859–1864.

The interior retains elaborate plasterwork decoration and a nearly intact series of original box pews. It is the oldest surviving independent chapel in Lincolnshire with its original seating intact.

== History ==
The church was constructed in 1806 and closed in c. 1993.
