= Baysgarth School =

Location
- Barrow Road; Barton-upon-Humber, Lincolnshire, DN18 6AE; England; 53.68127°N 0.43141°W

Information
- Type: Community school
- Local authority: North Lincolnshire
- Department for Education URN: 118109 Tables
- Ofsted: Reports
- Headteacher: Jade Driscoll
- Gender: Coeducational
- Age: 11 to 16
- Enrolment: 1050
- Houses: Stirling, Halifax, Blenheim, Wellington, Lancaster
- Colours: Red(S), Green(H), Yellow(B), Purple(W), Blue(L)
- Website: https://riverviewfos.com/baysgarth/

Baysgarth School is a coeducational secondary school located in Barton-upon-Humber, North Lincolnshire, England.

== Admissions ==
Baysgarth is a community school administered by North Lincolnshire Council. Since 2006 the school has had a specialism in technology. School curriculum includes GCSEs, NVQs and ASDAN courses.

The school previously had a partnership with Brigg Sixth Form (which includes Sir John Nelthorpe School and The Vale Academy) to offer a wider range of sixth form courses over the three school sites. However Baysgarth School is no longer part of this consortium.

== History ==
=== Grammar school ===
The school began in 1931 with 60 children and 3 full-time and 5 part-time teachers, known as Barton Secondary School until September 1932, when it became Barton Grammar School.

In 1936 there was a teacher exchange, where Miss Anna Raby taught at Orange High School (New Jersey) and Miss A. McGaw taught in Lincolnshire. There were 323 at the school in 1952.

The Bishop of Lincoln spoke at the speech day in early November 1960, where he praised Lincolnshire's small grammar schools. By 1964 the school was full.

In 1969 former deputy head, Mary Stamp, organised a campaign to protest against comprehensive schools. In February 1971, Lindsey County Council decided to keep the grammar school, as it was; but Lindsey County Council was discontinued after April 1974, and the new county council chose not to keep the school.

=== Comprehensive ===
The school was established in 1975 through the merger of Barton Grammar School and Beretun Secondary Modern School, and it spans both of the former school locations.

== Headteachers ==
- September 1931, Harry C Boulton, economics teacher; he died aged 57, suddenly at home on Saturday April 15 1944 whilst headmaster
- September 1944, Mr Eric Clucas Sykes, aged 38, former head of geography at Burnage High School since 1934, he became head of Heanor Grammar School in Derbyshire in April 1951; he died aged 51, on November 11 1956, following a minor operation in Heanor Memorial Hospital, leaving a wife and two daughters Valerie and Margot; he lived at 14 Wilmot Street; his wife Violet died in Grantham on December 20 1994
- April 1951 N. G. Goddard, former head of languages at Leicester City Boys' Grammar School, being originally from 36 Chaworth Road in West Bridgford, and a football referee; his wife Ruth Goddard also occasionally taught history, he was vehemently against comprehensive schools, and desperately appealed to Lindsey County Council in November 1969; he left in April 1971, two months after Lindsey County Council had decided not to turn the school comprehensive; he died aged 90 on December 20 1999; his wife died in Scunthorpe General Hospital on February 14 1996

== Notable former pupils ==
- Peter D. Robinson, Presiding Bishop of the United Episcopal Church of North America
- Danielle Sharp (c2005-07)
- Vanessa Winship, photographer

=== Barton Grammar School ===
- author Marjorie Boulton (1925-2017), daughter of the headmaster
- Anthony John Clark, molecular biologist
- Jamie Cann, Labour Party MP from 1992-2001 for Ipswich
- Ted Lewis (writer), crime writer
- Henry Treece, poet (taught at the school)
