= Salvation Army Building =

Salvation Army Building or Salvation Army Headquarters may refer to any of the following structures:

- International Headquarters of The Salvation Army, London, England
- Salvation Army Building (Spokane, Washington), United States
- Salvation Army Building (Pittsburgh, Pennsylvania), United States
- Salvation Army Citadel, Barton-upon-Humber, England
- Salvation Army Hall, Surrey, England
- Salvation Army Headquarters (Manhattan), New York, United States
- Salvation Army Headquarters (Saint Paul, Minnesota), United States

== See also ==
- The Salvation Army Building (disambiguation)
