= The Salvation Army Building =

The Salvation Army Building may refer to:

- The Salvation Army Building (Pittsburgh, Pennsylvania)
- International Headquarters of The Salvation Army
- Wrigley Lodge, a building in Chicago, Illinois, also known as the Salvation Army Building
- Salvation Army Headquarters (Saint Paul, Minnesota)

== See also ==
- Salvation Army Building (disambiguation)
