= Salvation Army Citadel, Barton-upon-Humber =

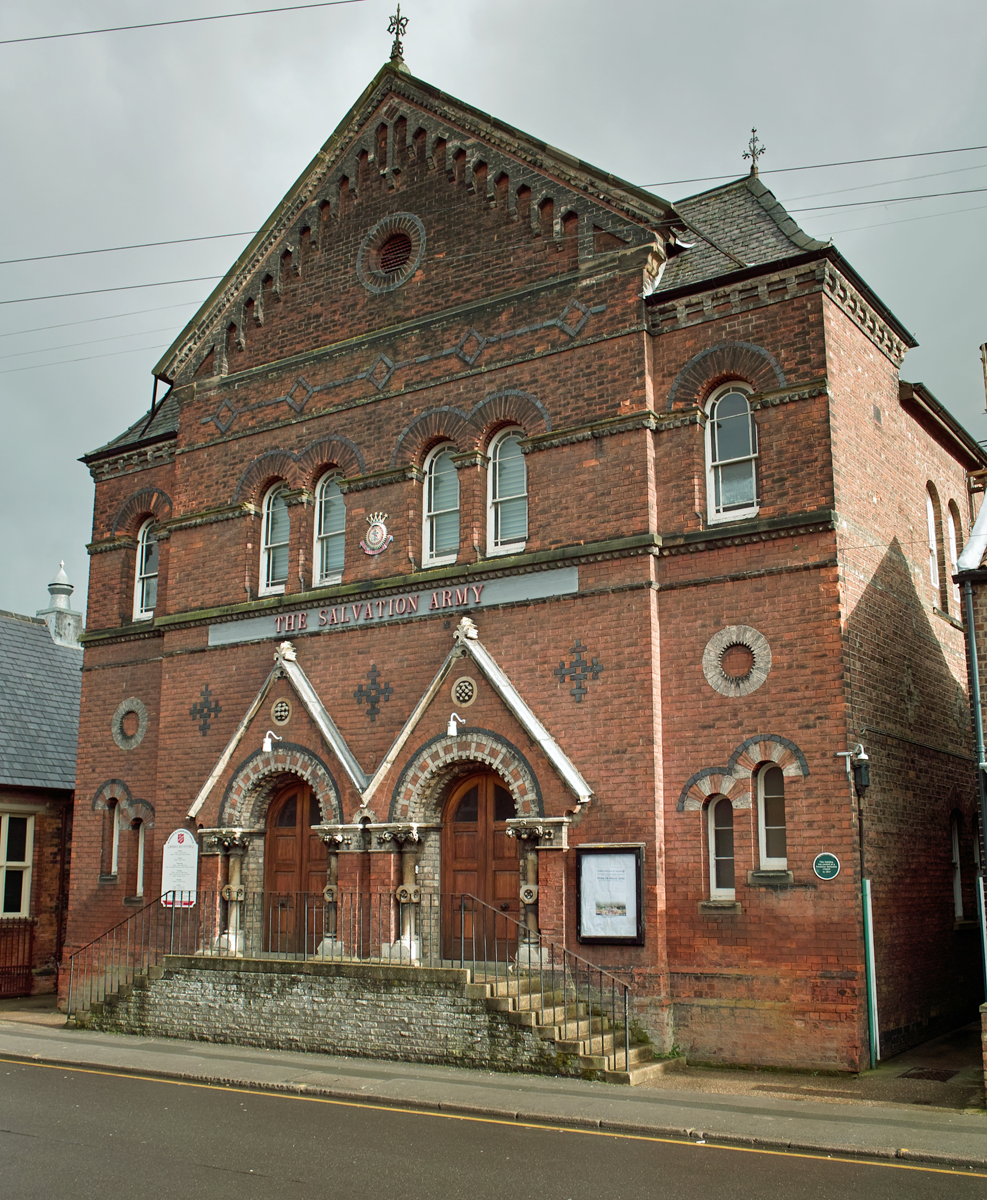

- Location in Lincolnshire
- 53.685179°N 0.43938002°W
- Location: Queen's Street, Barton-upon-Humber, North Lincolnshire, DN18 5QP, England
- OS grid reference: TA 03165 22100

History
- Built: 1867

Site notes
- Architect: Joseph Wright

Listed Building – Grade II
- Designated: 12 February 2008
- Reference no.: 1392472

The Salvation Army Citadel is a Grade II Listed building in Barton-upon-Humber, North Lincolnshire, England. It was founded in 1867 by Joseph Wright as a Primitive Methodist Chapel. It is immediately adjacent to the Wilderspin National School.

== Architecture ==
The building was listed for the quality of the Victorian design, especially the front of the building, its association with Joseph Wright, and for retaining its original arrangement internally.

It is a two-storey building which has a rectangular shaped chapel inside surrounded by a curved gallery. The front elevation has four bays and is built of red brick with decorations in darker coloured brick. It has two central front doors, each capped by a rounded arch and a triangular pediment and flanked by columns with foliate capitals. The doors open onto a set of stone steps. The side elevations are much plainer, with some decoration in coloured bricks.

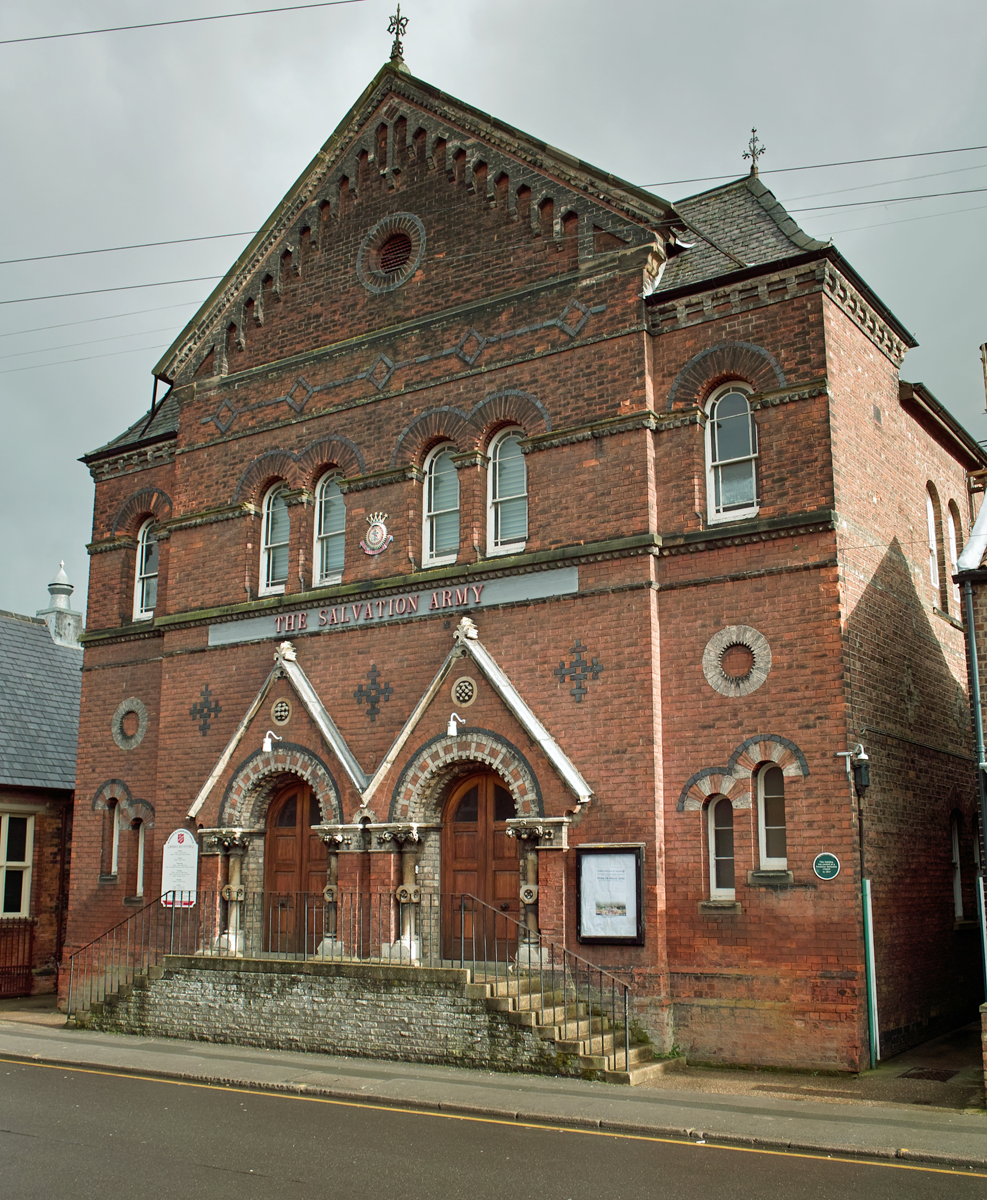
The Salvation Army Citadel, Barton-upon-Humber

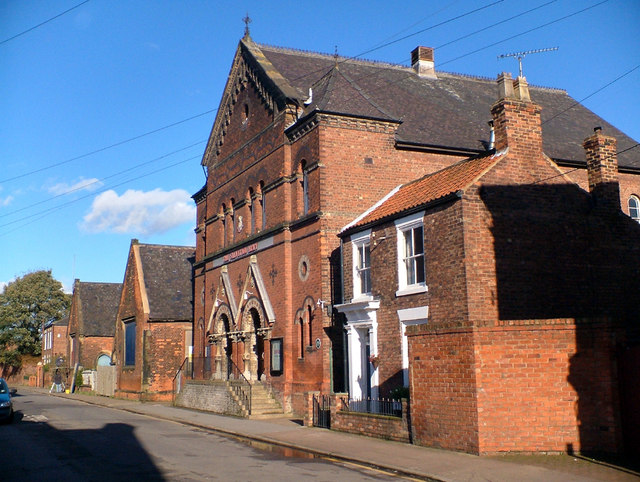

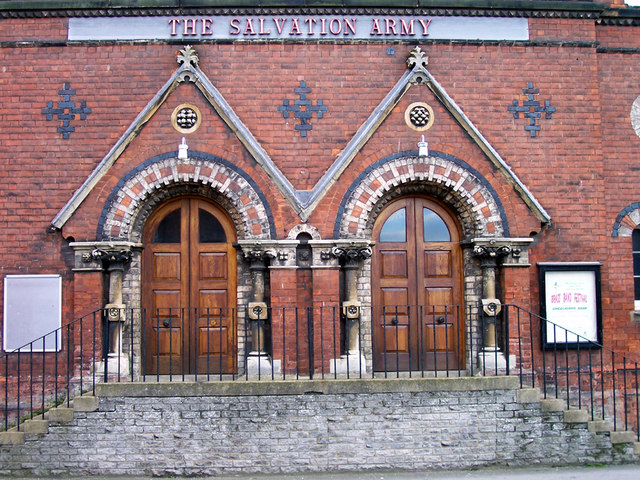
Close up of the front porch

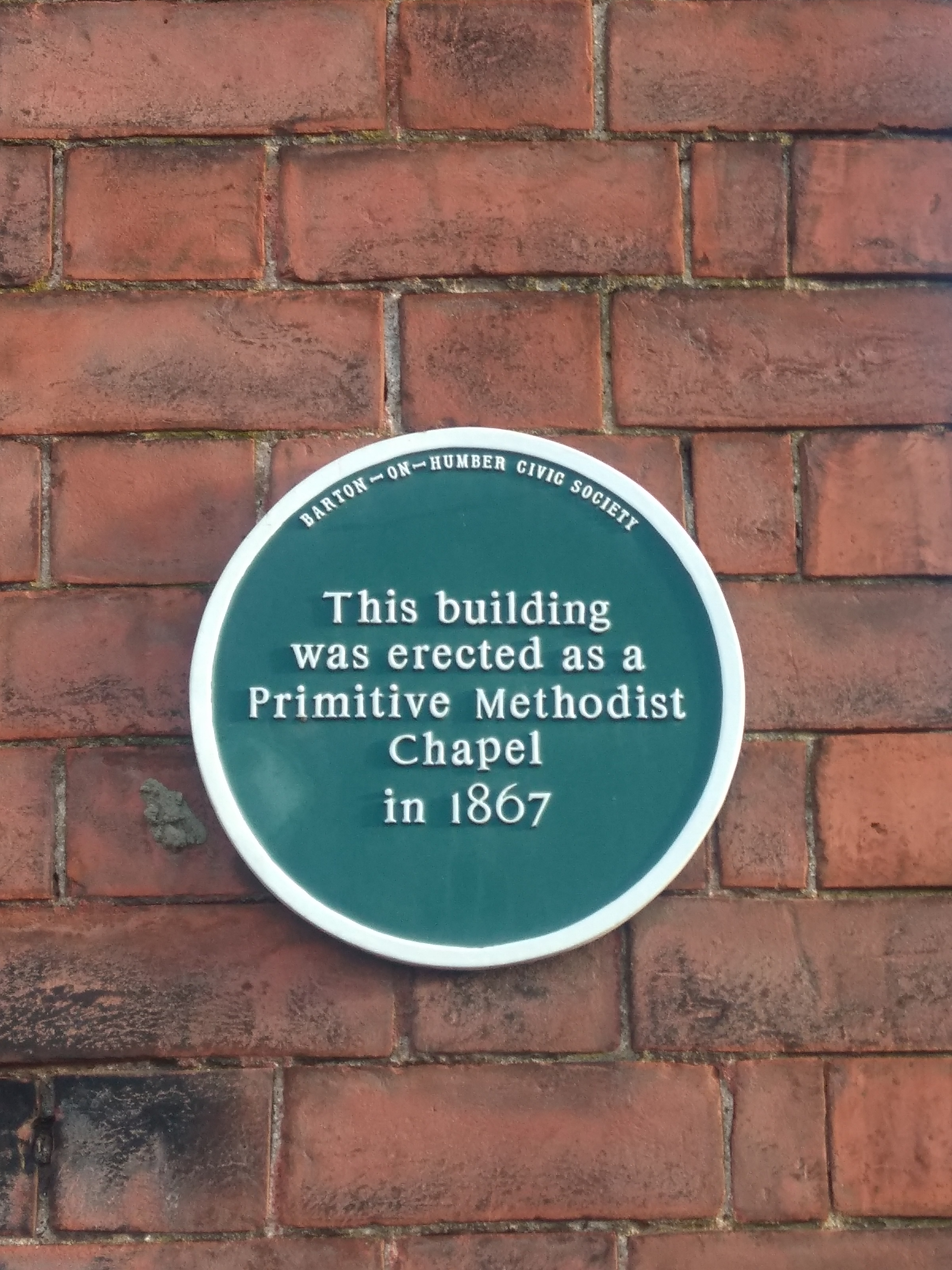
Blue plaque erected on the building by the Barton Civic Society

== History ==
The building construction started in April 1867. It replaced an earlier chapel of 1838 on Newport, itself a replacement for a chapel on King Street. It cost £1500 to build and had an original capacity of 600. It closed as a Methodist chapel in 1961 and reopened as a Salvation Army Citadel in 1965.
