= Cuthbert Brodrick =

English architect

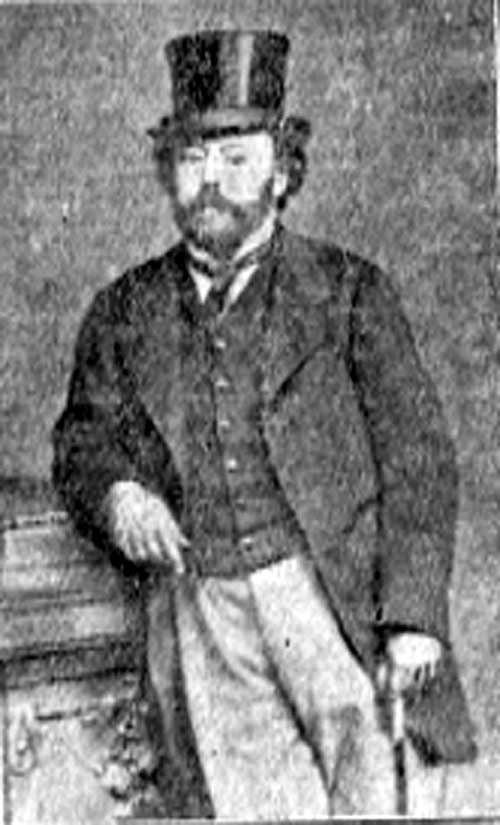
- Cuthbert Brodrick
- Born: 1 December 1821; Kingston upon Hull, England
- Died: 2 March 1905 (aged 83); Jersey, Channel Islands
- Occupation: Architect
- Buildings: Leeds Town Hall, Grand Hotel, Scarborough

Cuthbert Brodrick FRIBA (1 December 1821 – 2 March 1905) was an English architect whose most famous building is Leeds Town Hall.

== Early life ==
Brodrick was born in the Yorkshire port of Hull where his father was a well-to-do merchant and shipowner. He was the sixth son of ten children of John and Hannah Brodrick. The family lived at 39 George Street in the best residential area of Hull.

== Education and training ==
Brodrick attended Kingston College in Hull and, on leaving school, he became an articled pupil in the architectural practice of Henry Francis Lockwood whose premises were at 8 Dock Street. Brodrick remained at Lockwoods from 1837 until May 1844 when he embarked on the Grand Tour to continue his studies. He travelled through France to Rome in Italy. Whilst on the tour, he studied architecture in Paris; it influenced his later designs.

When Brodrick returned to Hull in 1846, he was offered a partnership in Lockwood's firm. He refused this, and set up in practice on his own at 1, Savile Street in Hull. He designed a number of buildings within the town. On leaving practice in 1870, he was succeeded in the business by his nephew Frederick Stead Brodrick.

== Leeds ==
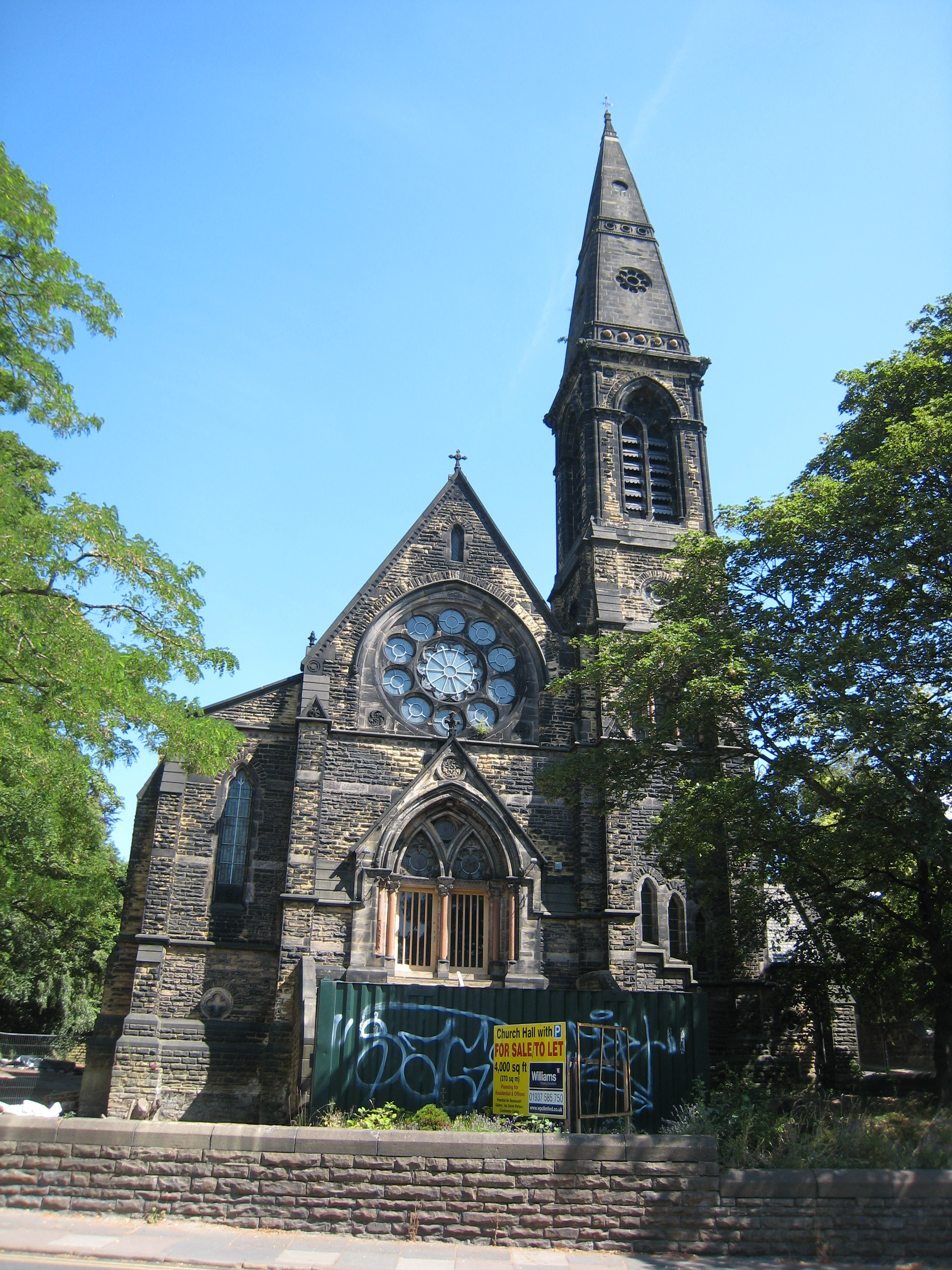
Headingley Congregational Church

In 1852, aged 29, Brodrick entered and won a competition for the design of Leeds Town Hall. The competition was judged by Charles Barry. The town hall was opened in September 1858 by Queen Victoria. Brodrick moved to an office at 30 Park Row, Leeds and acquired the nickname 'Town Hall, Leeds'.

Brodrick's only church was Headingley Congregational Church on Headingley Lane.

== Notable buildings ==
=== Leeds ===
- Leeds Town Hall, 1858
- Leeds Corn Exchange, 1860
- The Mechanics' Institute, 1860 (later Civic Theatre and now Leeds City Museum)
- The Oriental Baths in Cookridge Street, 1866 (demolished)
- King Street Warehouses, 1862 (demolished)
- Headingley Hill Congregational Church, 1864 (As of 2021 the building was out of use, with unused planning permission for flats)
- Moorland Terrace, 1859 (demolished)
- 9 Alma Road, 1859
- 49–51 Cookridge Street, 1864
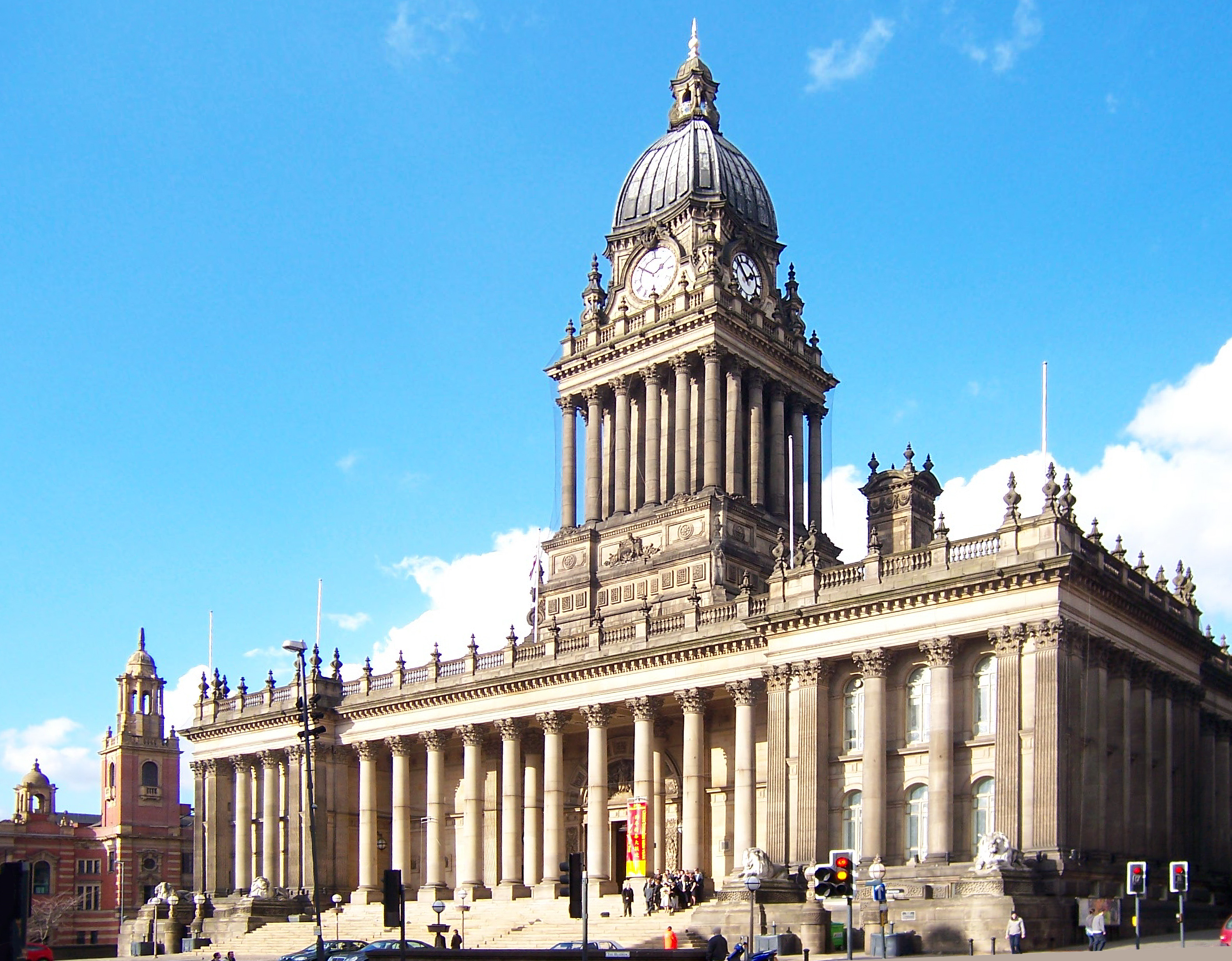
Leeds Town Hall

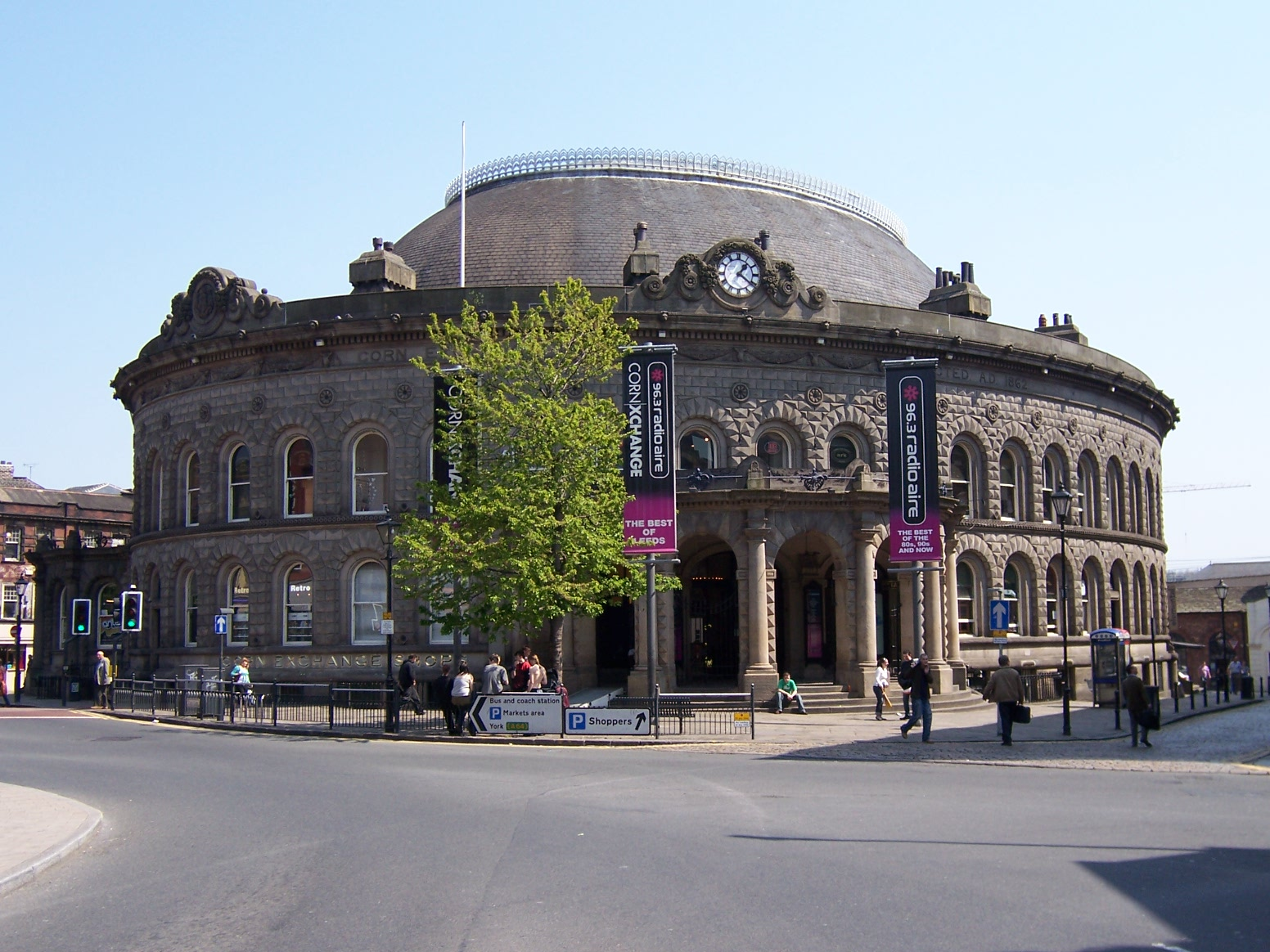
Leeds Corn Exchange

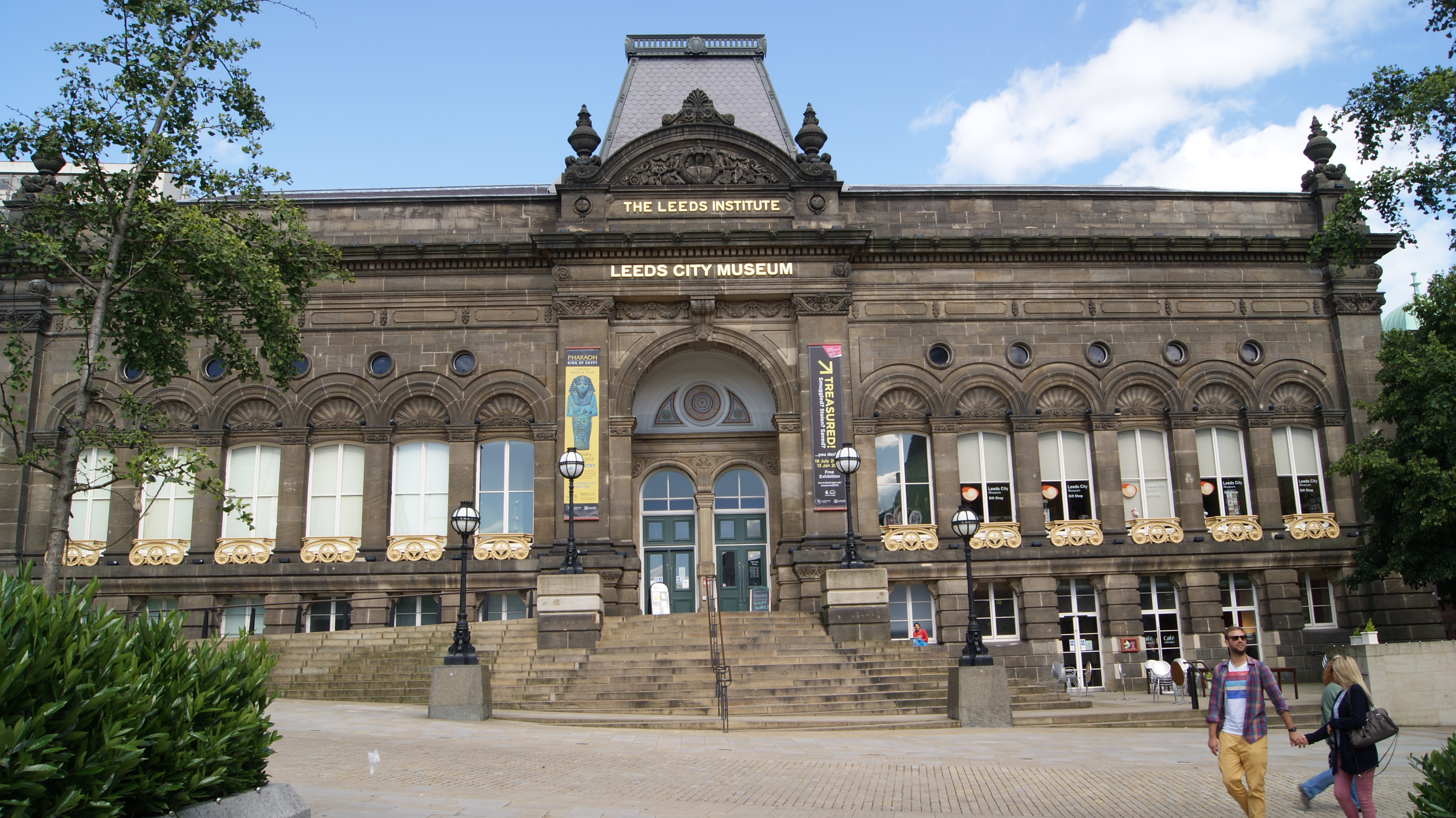
Leeds City Mechanics' Institute, now Leeds City Museum

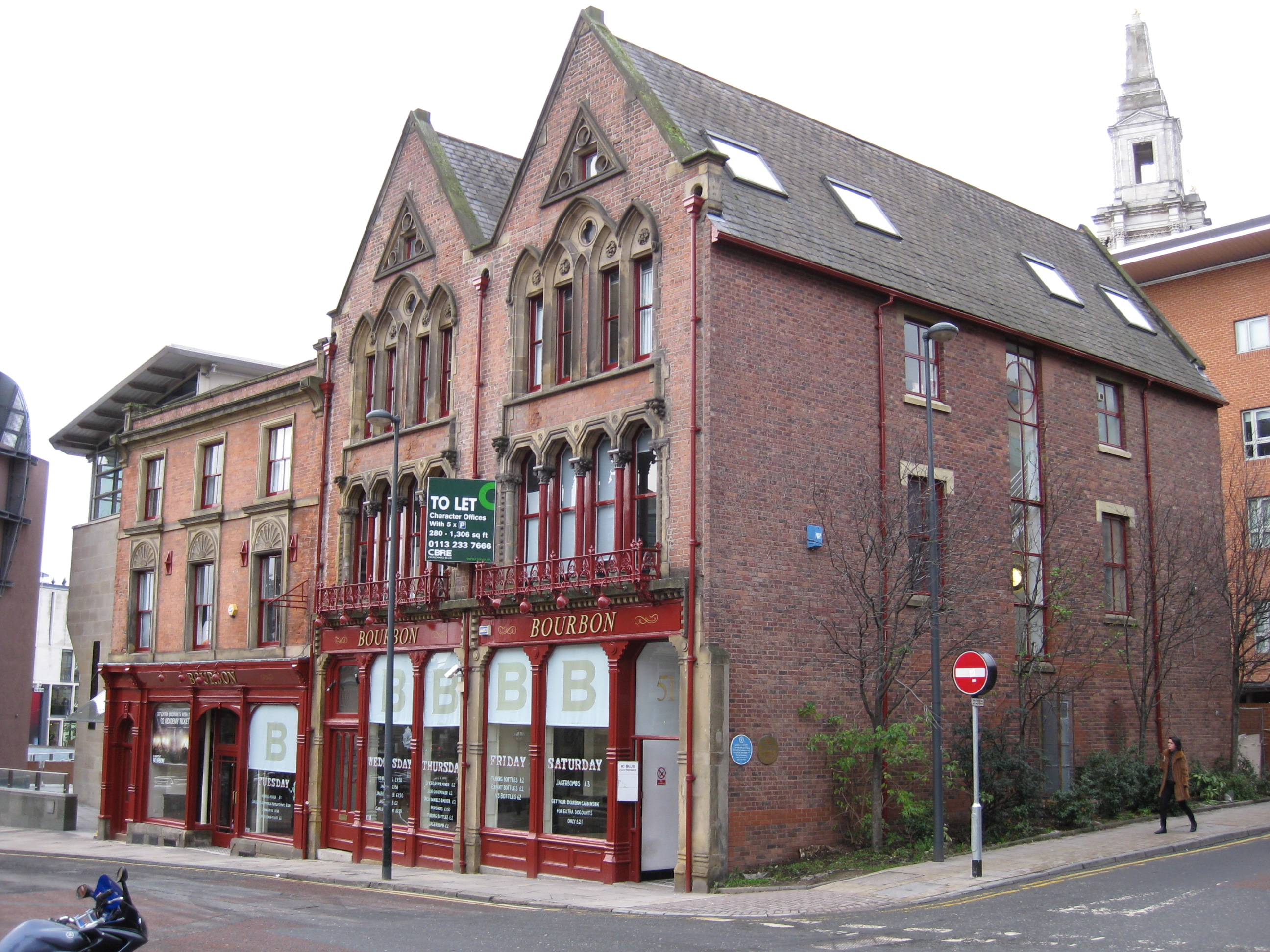
The Brodrick Building, Cookridge St, Leeds

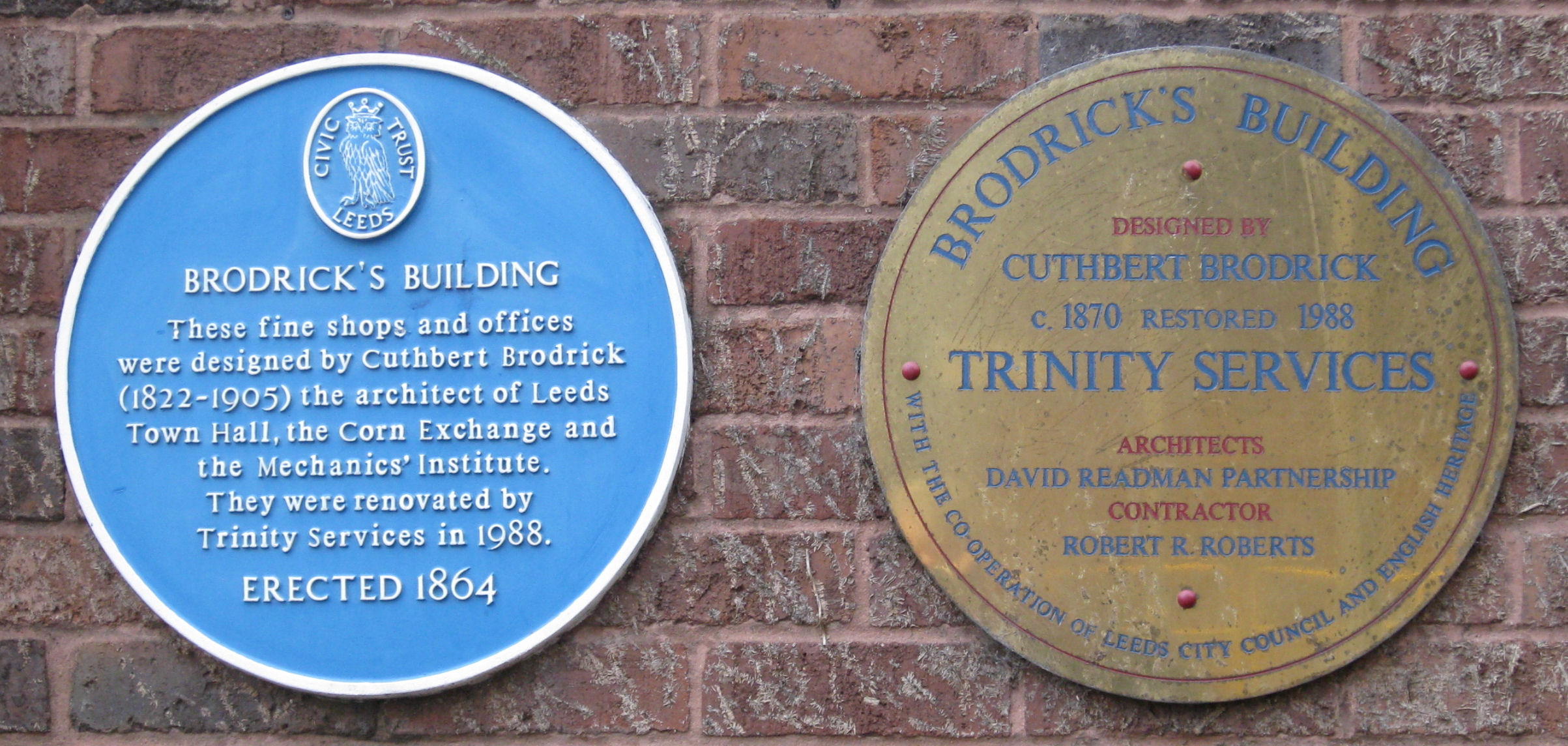
Plaques on the Brodrick Building

=== Hull ===
Brodrick designed a number of buildings in Hull, including the Royal Institution building in 1852 (which was destroyed in the Hull Blitz in 1941), and the Renaissance-style Town Hall in 1866, which was demolished in 1905 to make way for the present Guildhall. Since the demolition of Wellington House, in the Fruit Market area of the city, in 2014, no significant buildings by Brodrick survive in Hull. However, just north of Hull in Beverley, his 37 & 39 North Bar Within (previously Yorkshire Water Authority and 'Pizza Express' in 2015) still stands.

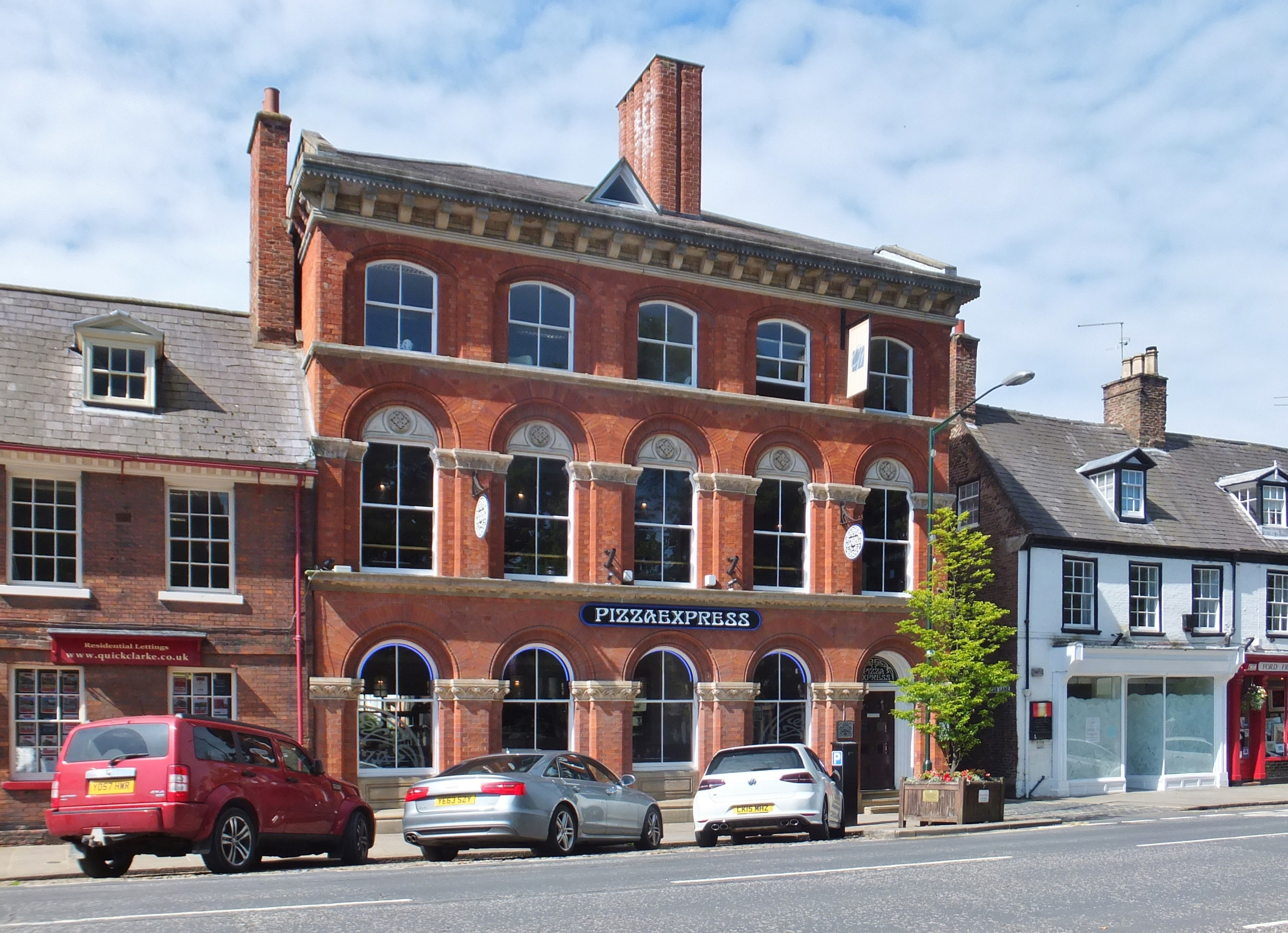
37-39 North Bar Within, Beverley, in 2015

=== Elsewhere ===
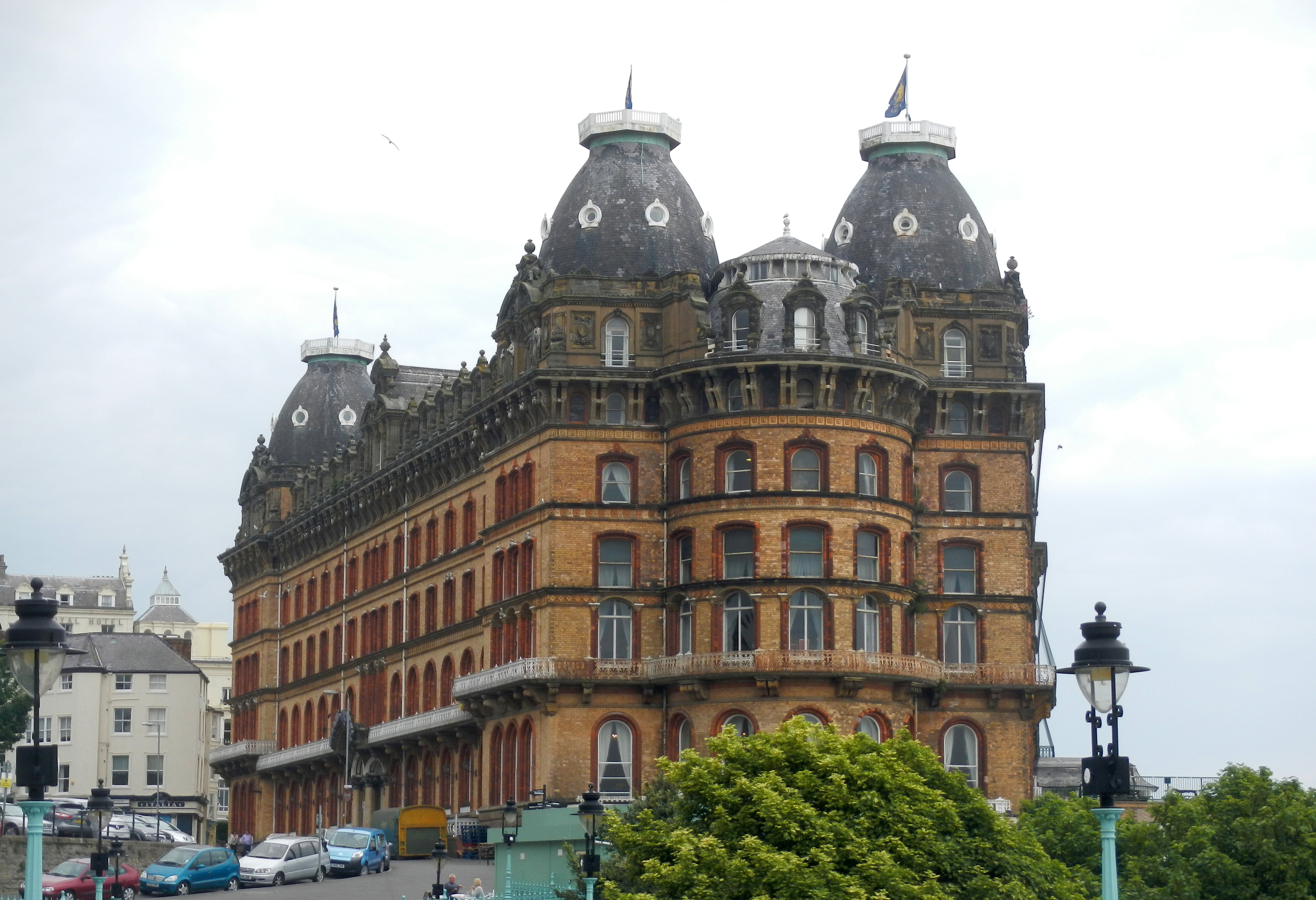
Scarborough Grand Hotel

Brodrick designed the Grand Hotel in Scarborough. Completed in 1867, it was one of the largest hotels in the world.

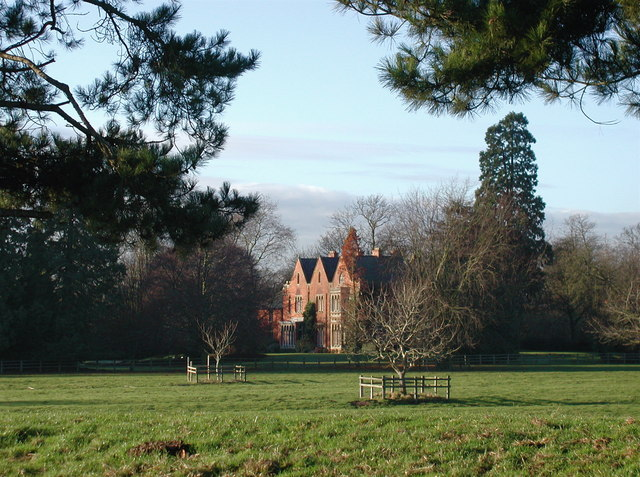
Yokefleet Hall, Yorkshire

Brodrick designed Yokefleet Hall, Yorkshire which commenced building in 1868. Many properties in Yokefleet were built around the time and in style of the house, including two lodges, east and west of the hall.

Brodrick designed Wells House which opened in 1856 as a Hydro, offering water treatments and pure air.

== Personal life ==
In 1870, Brodrick moved to France where in 1876 he bought a house at Le Vésinet, St. Germain-en-Laye. He retired in 1875, and spent his time painting, exhibiting his work and gardening. In about 1898 he went to live with his niece in Jersey, where he rented a house, La Colline, at Gorey. Whilst living there he designed, and planted a garden. He died in Jersey on 2 March 1905, and is buried in St Martin's Churchyard.

== Legacy ==
Among Brodrick's pupils was Joseph Wright.

A Wetherspoons public house, the 'Cuthbert Brodrick', opened on 22 October 2007 on Millennium Square in Leeds opposite one of the buildings he designed (the Leeds City Museum) and not far from another (Leeds Town Hall). It is near the site on Cookridge Street of the Oriental Baths which he also designed; they were built in 1866 and demolished in 1969.

Brodrick was the subject of a 2007 BBC2 television programme, The Case of the Disappearing Architect, by Jonathan Meades.

Cuthbert Brodrick is commemorated on four blue plaques, on Leeds Town Hall, Brodrick's Building, Wells House and Leeds Corn Exchange.
