= Joseph Wright (architect) =

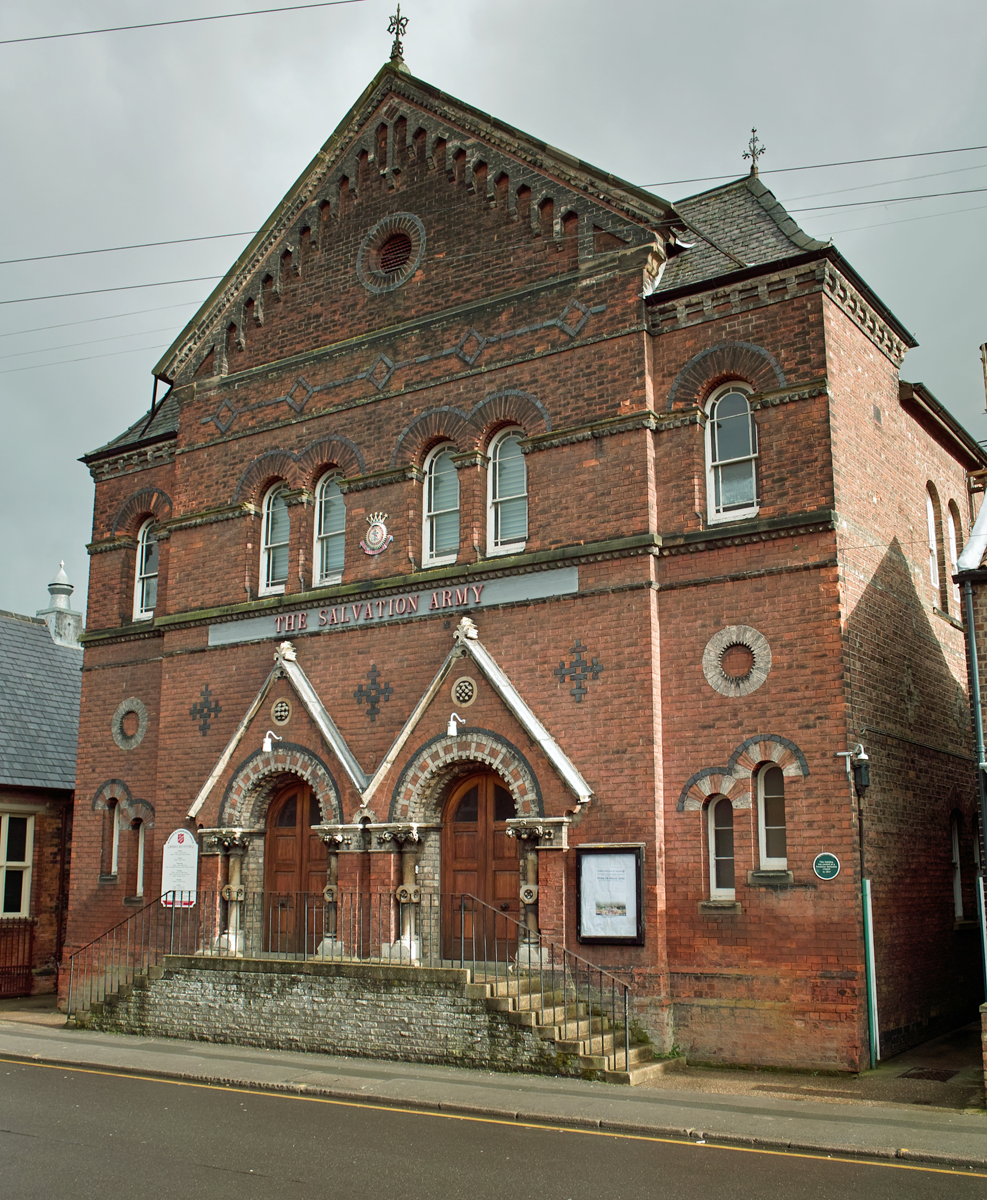
Wright's 1867 chapel in Barton upon Humber, in use as a Salvation Army Citadel in 2010

Joseph Wright (1818–1885) was an English architect from Hull, Yorkshire. He was a pupil of Cuthbert Brodrick and designed about 20 Primitive Methodist chapels, predominantly in East Yorkshire.

The grade II listed chapel he designed in Barton-upon-Humber was later a Salvation Army Citadel and is as of 2019 an event venue known as the Joseph Wright Hall.
