= Salvation Army Building (Pittsburgh, Pennsylvania) =

Historic building in Pittsburgh, Pennsylvania

Distrikt Hotel Pittsburgh
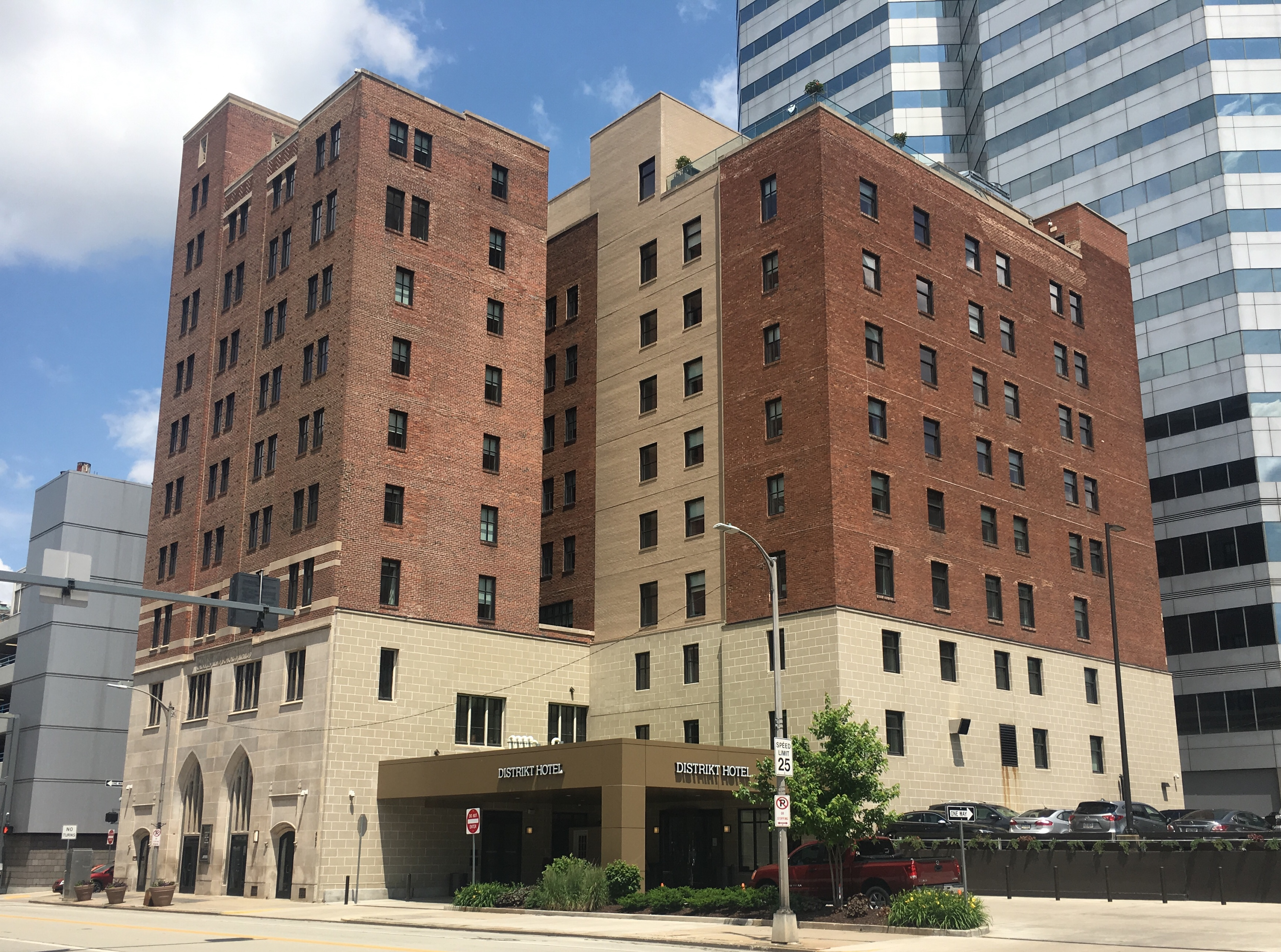
- The former Salvation Army Building, now Distrikt Hotel Pittsburgh in 2019

General information
- Status: Completed
- Type: Hotel
- Location: 425–435 Boulevard of the Allies, Pittsburgh, Pennsylvania, United States
- Construction started: May 18, 1924
- Opening: 1924
- Cost: $500,000
- Owner: Greenway Realty Holdings

Height
- Roof: 119 feet (36 m)

Technical details
- Floor count: 10
- Floor area: 91,322 sq ft (8,484.1 m^{2})

Design and construction
- Architect: Thomas Pringle
- Developer: Salvation Army of Western Pennsylvania
- Main contractor: Rose and Fisher
- The Salvation Army Building
- U.S. National Register of Historic Places
- Location within Pittsburgh Location within Pennsylvania Location within the United States
- Coordinates: 40°26′15″N 79°59′56″W
- Built: 1924
- Architectural style: Late Gothic Revival
- NRHP reference No.: 15001031
- Added to NRHP: February 2, 2016

The Salvation Army Building is a historic building located at 425–435 Boulevard of the Allies in Pittsburgh, Pennsylvania. The building was constructed in 1924 with a large eastern addition in 1930 in the Late Gothic Revival style. The multi-purpose building originally housed the headquarters, residential and recreational functions for the Salvation Army of Western Pennsylvania from 1924 until 2008. It was listed on the National Register of Historic Places on February 2, 2016.

It was also known as The People's Institute and The Evangeline Residence for Young Women at different times. The building was redeveloped into the boutique Distrikt Hotel Pittsburgh in 2017.

== Description and history ==
The building was constructed in 1924 bounded by Boulevard of the Allies, Cherry Way and 3rd Avenue, with the 1930 addition along 3rd Avenue. The building ranges from 10 stories at the southwest to 8 stories along the north. The architect for both the 1924 structure and the 1930 addition was Thomas Pringle, with an initial estimated cost of $500,000. The builder was the Pittsburgh firm of Rose and Fisher.

Referred to as "one of the most complete Army buildings in the United States," the multi-purpose building allowed the Western Pennsylvania Division of the Salvation Army to consolidate five administrative offices into a single location as well as provide a variety of services.

On the 3rd Avenue side of the building, the lower floors contained the Relief Department and the emergency hospital, which was the only one of its kind in downtown Pittsburgh. The upper floors contained a men's dormitory, as well as the Hotel Argonne. The Salvation Army operated several Hotel Argonnes throughout the country, dedicated to the veterans of the Meuse-Argonne Offensive in World War I.

The men's dormitory provided a temporary place for needy men to sleep with access to showers and laundry facilities. The requested daily rate in 1925, was a twenty-five to thirty cent donation, but no one was turned away for his inability to pay. Wake-up time was at 6 am every day other than Sunday, so that the men could be up and looking for employment.

The Boulevard of the Allies side contained a swimming pool, gymnasium, locker room, boiler room, an auditorium seating 800, and basement storage space. The upper floors of the Boulevard of the Allies side and the entirety of the 1930 addition accommodated the Evangeline Residence for Young Women. The 8th floor contained a dining room and kitchen, which served both the residents and employees of the building, and the 9th floor contained the laundry.

On the southwest corner of the Boulevard of the Allies side and Cherry Way, building has a bas-relief stone with Gothic style lettering reading "to the GLORY OF GOD and the welfare of humanity 1924." Centered above two arched doorways along Boulevard of the Allies is a bas-relief with Gothic style lettering reading "The Salvation Army."

=== The Evangeline Residence for Young Women ===
The Evangeline Residence for Young Women was named for Evangeline Booth, the 4th General of the Salvation Army and daughter of William Booth, founder of the Salvation Army. First established in Washington, D.C. in 1921, these residences soon expanded to other cities and intended to provide young professional women affordable, long-term housing in a Christian environment.

The women were charged a small fee to cover operating expenses, as the residence was not intended to generate a profit. In Pittsburgh, the Evangeline Residence for Young Women opened in 1927 with 229 single and double rooms, and none were rented for only single nights. Each applicant had to meet the following qualifications:

1. The applicant must be a young woman without a home within commuting distance of Pittsburgh or from a broken home within the city.
2. She must be less than thirty-five years of age and preferably less than twenty-five.
3. She must be in a low-income bracket, if employed.
4. She must be of a good moral character.

The Evangeline Residence for Young Women closed on December 31, 1981, after operating at a financial loss for over twenty years.

=== Salvation Army Departure and Distrikt Hotel ===
In December 2008, The Salvation Army of Western Pennsylvania relocated its headquarters out of the nine-story building on the Boulevard of the Allies and into a two-story building in the Carnegie Office Park in Carnegie.

For nearly a year prior to their relocation, the Salvation Army had the Downtown building up for sale, with an asking price of $5.5 million. Allegheny County listed the property with a market value of $3.6 million in 2007. Initially it was thought The Art Institute of Pittsburgh or Point Park University would purchase the building due to their close proximity. Two separate deals over 6 years to sell the building were unsuccessful. In 2009 Cleveland-based Polaris Real Estate Equities, known for student housing projects, had an agreement to acquire the property for $4 million before backing out. MinSec Companies of Philadelphia, had an agreement to buy the building in 2011 and remodel it to provide counseling services to help convicted offenders make the transition out of jail. The agreement was dependent upon the company winning a contract from Allegheny County.

Greenway Realty Holdings purchased the former Salvation Army building for $2.8 million ($2.16 million for the building and nearly $800,000 for an adjoining parking lot) in 2014. The building was redeveloped into the 186-room boutique Distrikt Hotel Pittsburgh in 2017.

== Gallery ==
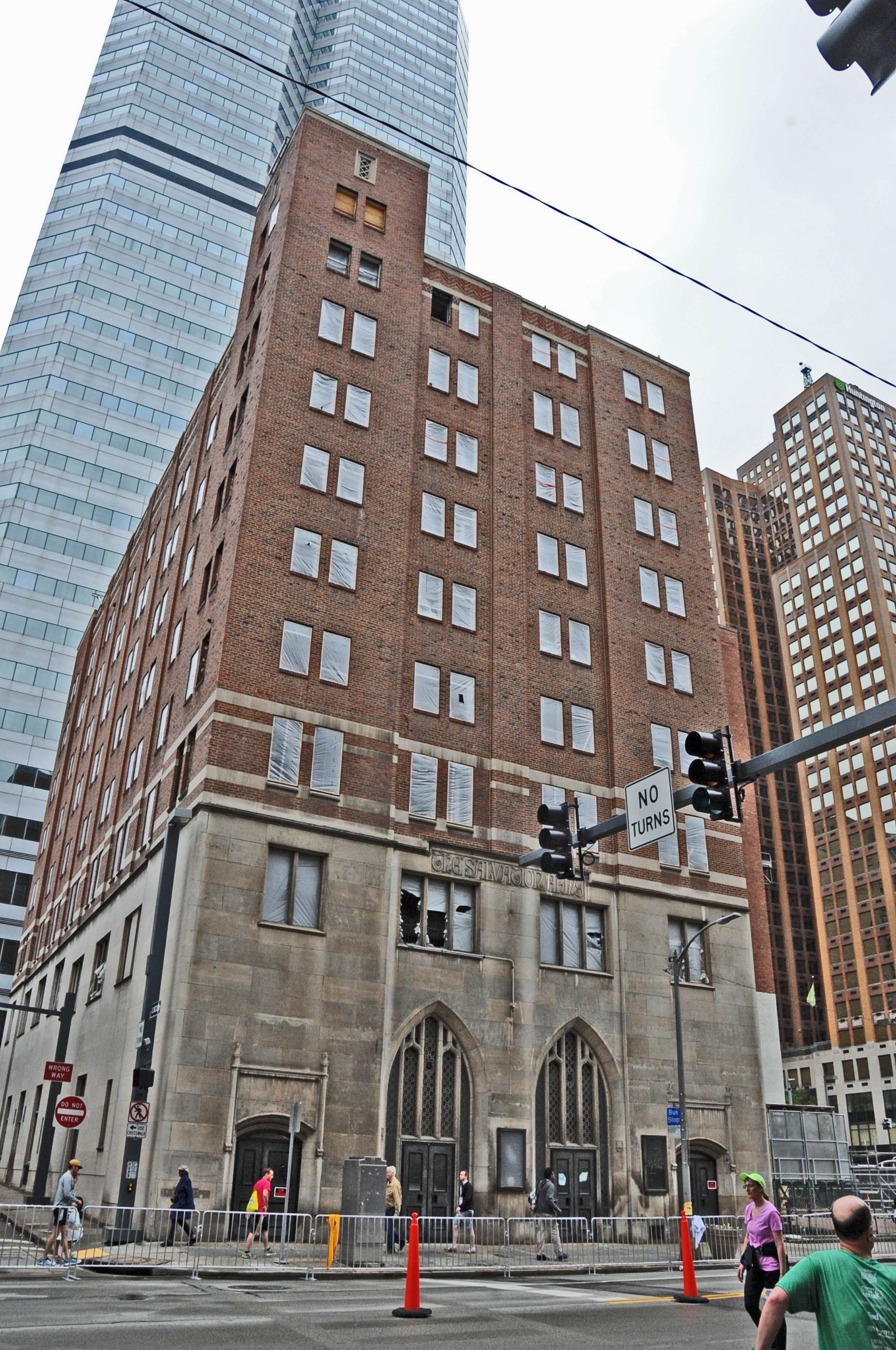
The Salvation Army Building in 2016

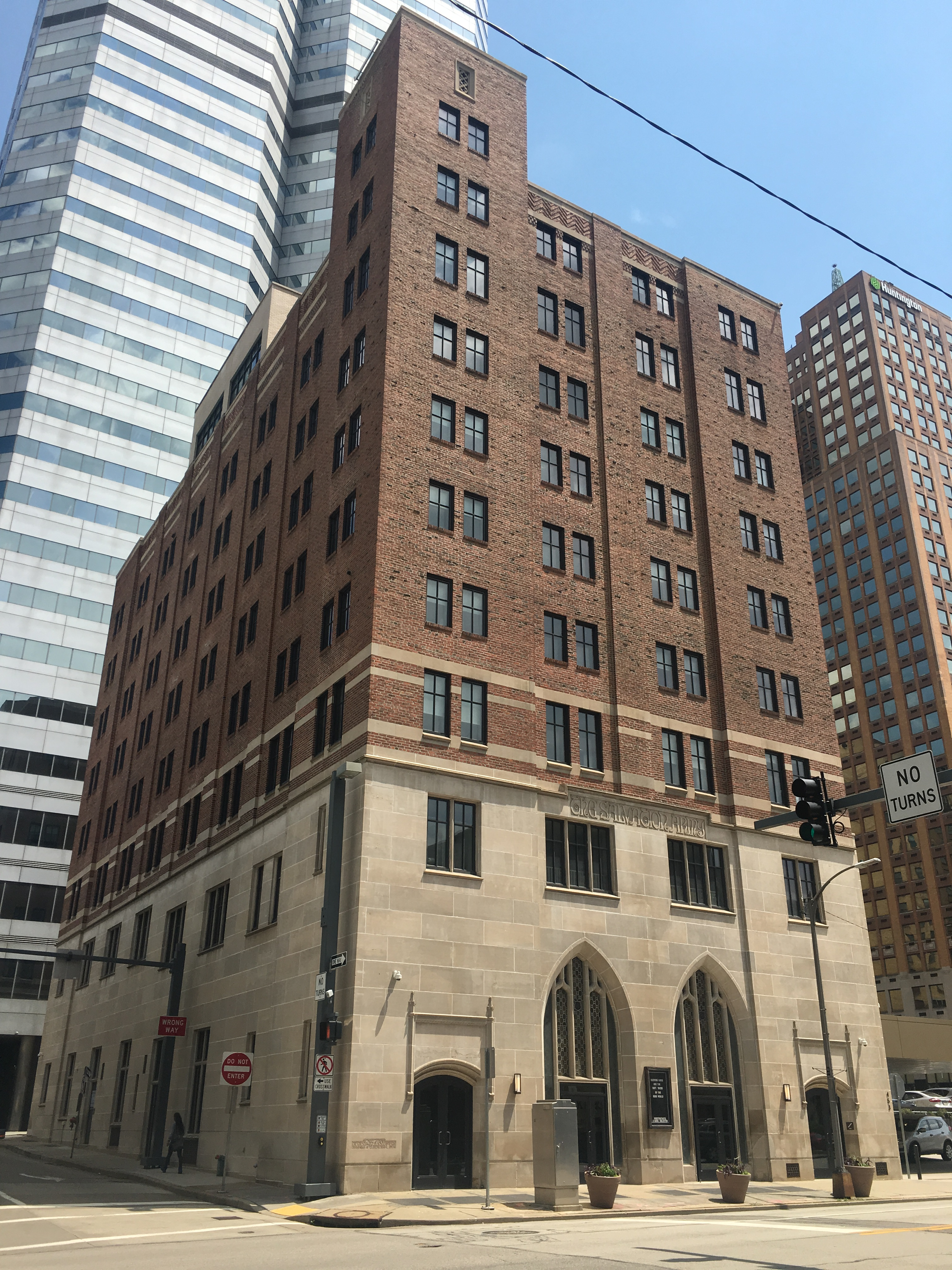
The Salvation Army Building, after being redeveloped into Distrikt Hotel in 2019

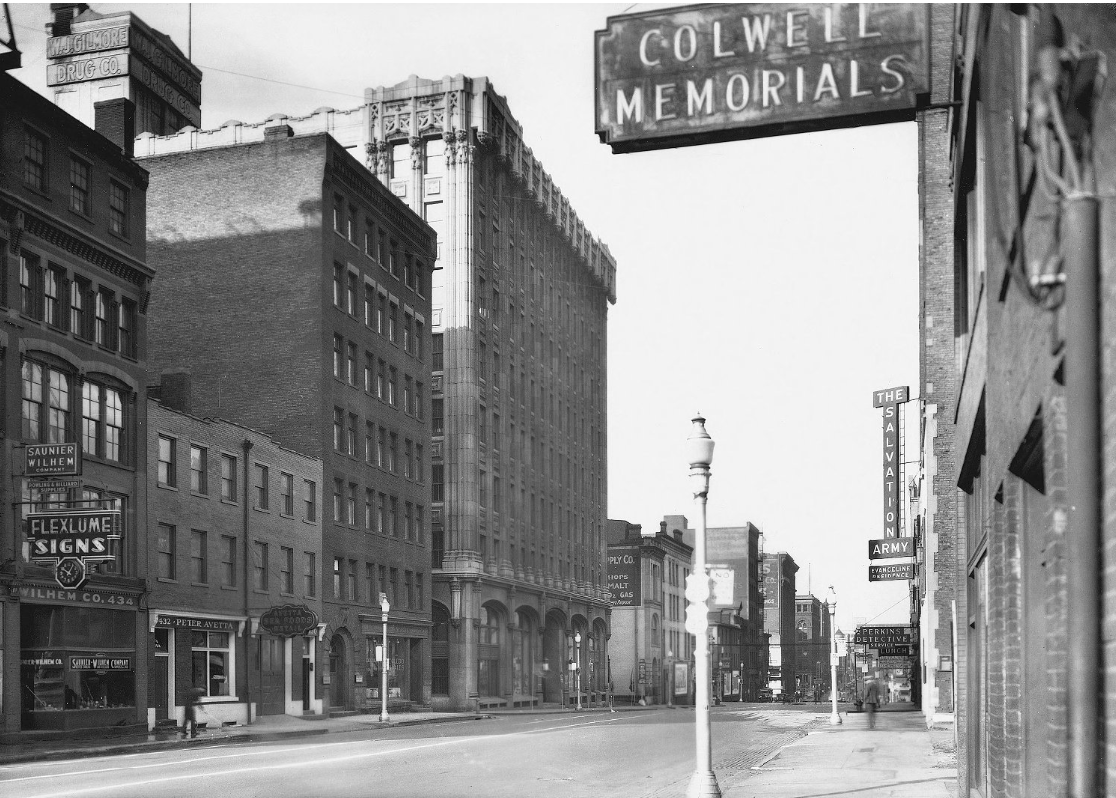
Looking west along the Boulevard of The Allies on November 14, 1937. The Salvation Army Evangeline Residence sign is visible on the right.
