= Salvation Army Headquarters (Saint Paul, Minnesota) =

Historic structure (demolished 1998)

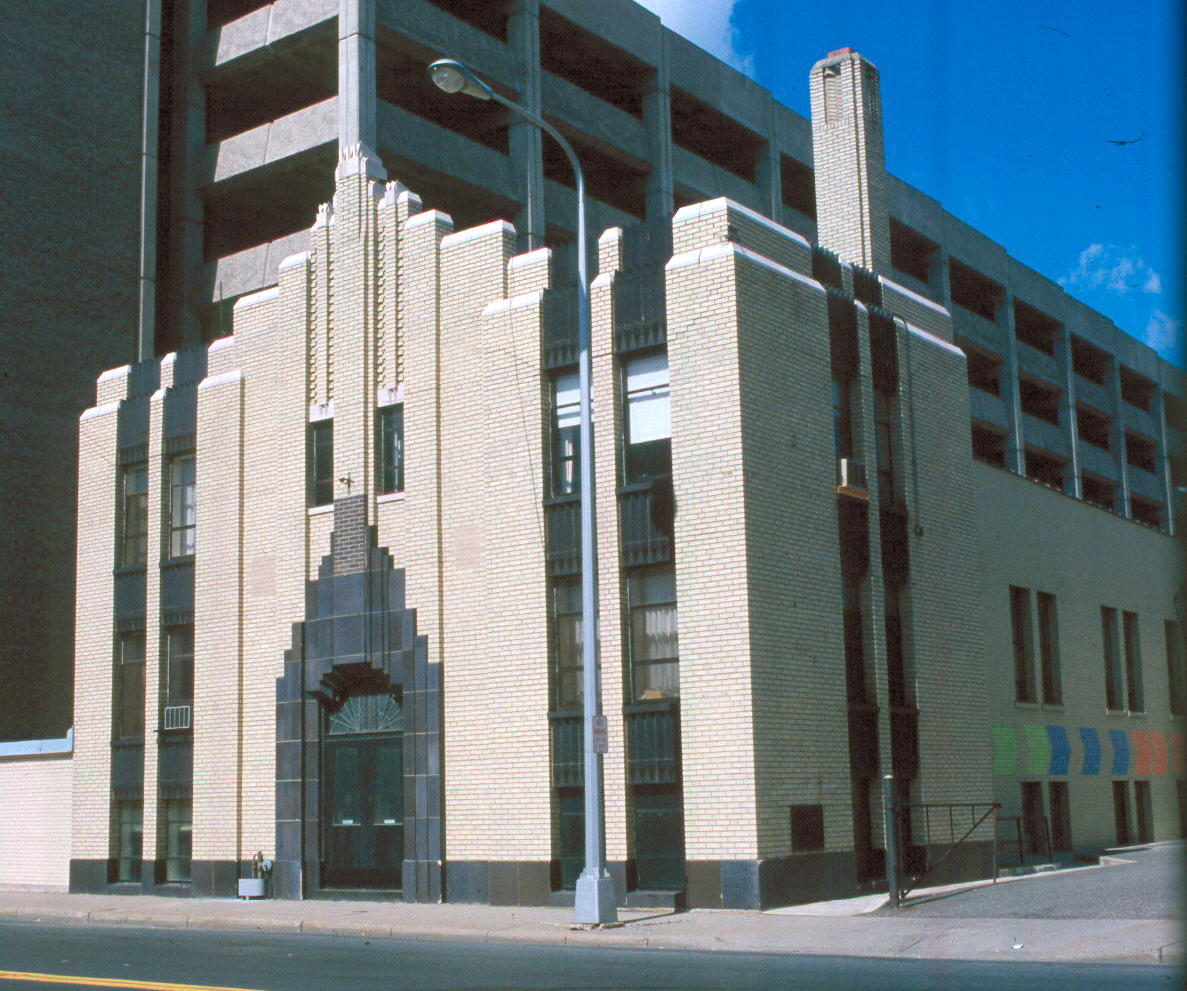
- Interactive map of the Salvation Army Headquarters area
- Alternative names: Seton Center

General information
- Location: 57 10th Street West, Saint Paul, Minnesota, USA
- Coordinates: 44°56′57″N 93°06′00″W
- Completed: 1931
- Demolished: January 1998
- Cost: $25,000
- Client: The Salvation Army
- Owner: HealthEast Care System

Design and construction
- Architect: Albert C. Fehlow

The Salvation Army Headquarters, later known as the Seton Center, was a historic structure in St. Paul, Minnesota. Deemed eligible for listing on the National Register of Historic Places (NRHP) in February 1983, owner opposition prevented it from being officially listed. Despite protests by preservationists, the building was demolished by its owner in January 1998.

== Structure ==
The Salvation Army Headquarters was a 2 1/2-story, three-bay structure in the Zigzag Moderne phase of Art Deco architecture. The symmetrical facade incorporated the clean lines, geometric patterns and decorative motifs that characterized that particular phase of the Art Deco style. These included setback and stepped patterning, contrasting light and dark colored building materials and an overall vertical orientation. The walls used a cream-colored pressed brick that contrasted with brownish-gray tiles. The vertically aligned windows were set in black metal window frames and divided by black metal spandrels. The dominant feature was the centrally located entrance, which was highlighted by extending the central bay up above the roofline and surrounding the entrance with tile in a step pattern that created a ziggurat effect typical with the style. At the top, the entire wall stepped back to enhance the geometric patterning of the design. A cornerstone on the east side of the facade read: "Erected to the Glory of God and Good of Humanity, A.D. 1931."

In addition to using the Zigzag Moderne style, the building's design was notable for its used of glazed architectural terra-cotta, a machine-made material developed in the late 1920s. Its construction was a part of a short building boom (1929–31) of Art Deco buildings in St. Paul, which included the Saint Paul City Hall and Ramsey County Courthouse, Saint Paul Women's City Club and others.

Over the years, the main facade of the building remained mostly intact. Only the original Salvation Army sign and flagpole holder were removed. An addition was added to the west side wall in 1962 to provide storage and connect the building to the adjacent hospital.

== History ==
The Salvation Army, an international religious and charitable organization, was founded in the United Kingdom in 1865 and established its first American office in 1876. The office in St. Paul was formed in 1887. The structure was commissioned by The Salvation Army in 1929 and designed by architect Albert C. Fehlow in the Zigzag Moderne style of Art Deco. Fehlow was employed by the Chicago headquarters of the Salvation Army and would go on to design four more buildings employing similar materials throughout the Midwest.

At the time the building was constructed, The Salvation Army was trying to establish itself as a modern organization and thus selected to employ a fashionable, progressive style for their headquarters. A few years previous, the organization's headquarters in New York City (1929) was also built in an Art Deco style. The style was considered ideal because it was new and had a futuristic look without any reference to traditional ecclesiastic or public architecture.

The Salvation Army Headquarters was completed in 1931 at a cost of $25,000. During the Great Depression, the organization was very active in providing services to the needy. It also served as a Sunday school for children. The building was sold in 1957 and the organization moved to a different headquarters in 1958. It was purchased by the neighboring St. Joseph's Hospital for use as a pre-natal clinic and offices. St. Joseph's Hospital is the oldest hospital in Minnesota. At the time, the building's name was changed to the Seton Center.

In April 1981, the Heritage Preservation Commission of the City of St. Paul nominated the Seton Center for official designation as a Heritage Preservation Site. The Ramsey County Historical Society and State Historic Preservation Office subsequently nominated the building for listing on the NRHP was made in October 1981. On February 24, 1983, the National Park Service determined that the Salvation Army Headquarters was eligible for the NRHP; however, because the building's owner, St. Joseph's Hospital, filed an objection to the listing, the building could not be listed.

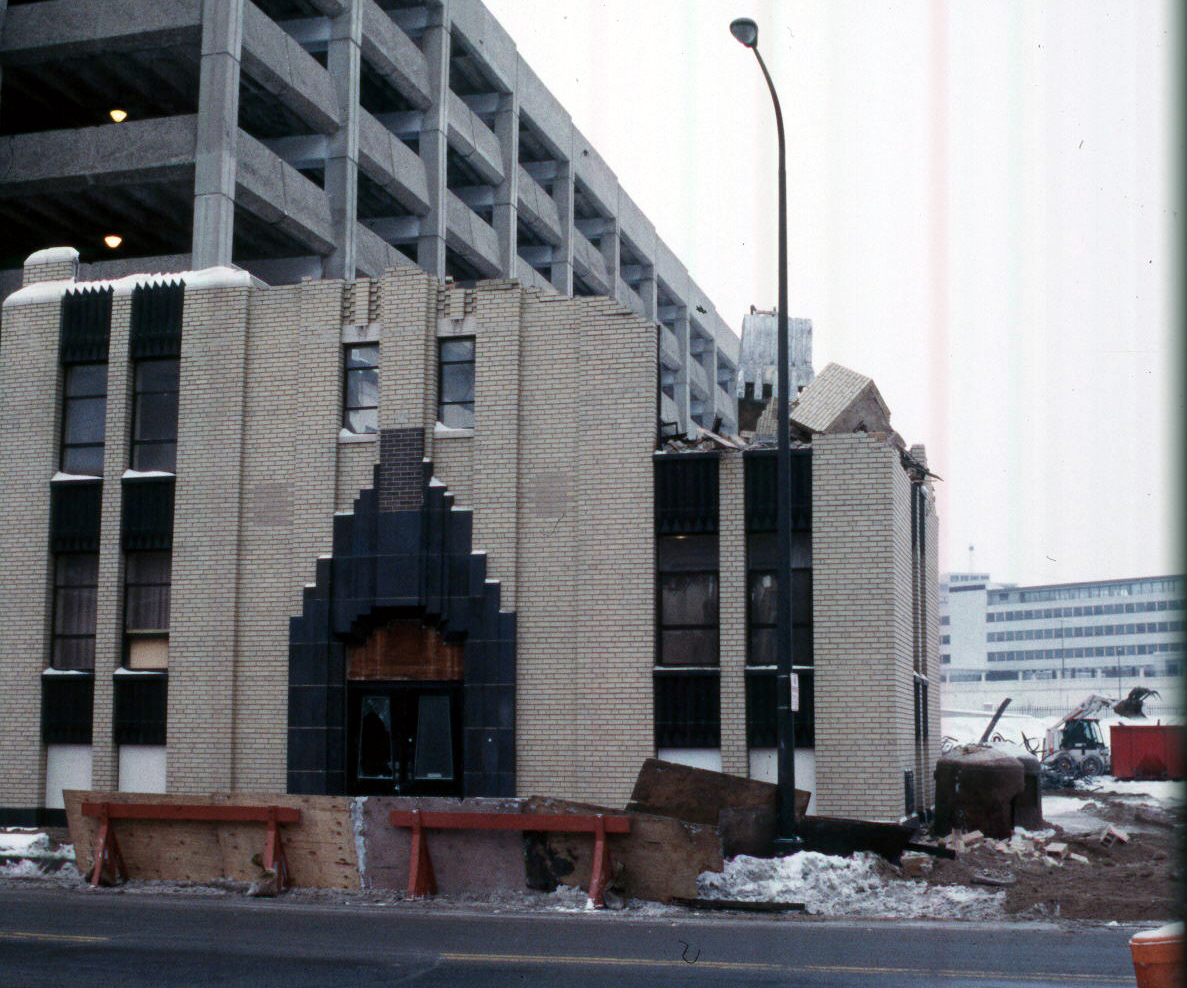
The building during its demolition in late January 1998

In 1988, the hospital, which was then owned by HealthEast Care System, announced plans for a new building on the site, however the plans fell through and the building was not demolished. However, in late 1996, HealthEast announced plans to demolish the structure because of its maintenance costs and a lack of suitable use. In November 1996, the company announced it would be willing to sell the building or its notable facade for $1 to anyone willing to assume the cost of dismantling and moving it. Because the company wished to retain ownership of the land for future development, the offer was only for the building itself and not the site. The St. Paul Heritage Preservation Commission opposed the demolition, but because it had no official local or national historic designation it had no legal authority to stop a demolition. At the time of the proposed demolition, HealthEast had plans to close the adjacent St. Joseph's Hospital and redevelop the area; the hospital still exists as of 2010. In March 1997, the Minnesota Historical Society sent a letter to HealthEast offered assistance in aiding in finding new uses for the structure and noted that moving a historic building often severely compromises its historic integrity. In addition, they noted that, if listed on the NRHP, the building could qualify for federal preservation tax benefits. HealthEast hired an architect in 1997 to look for reuse possibilities, but it was determined that such a restoration and adaptation would be too costly to be feasible for the hospital. By January 16, 1998, no one had taken up HealthEast's offer to buy and move the structure. The building was demolished later that month.
