= Grade I listed buildings in North Lincolnshire =

There are over 9,000 Grade I listed buildings in England. This page is a list of these buildings in the district of North Lincolnshire in Lincolnshire.

== North Lincolnshire ==
Name	Location	Type	Completed (Note: The date given is the date used by Historic England as significant for the initial building or that of an important part in the structure's description.)	Date designated	Grid ref. (Note: The grid reference is based on the British national grid reference system, sometimes known as OSGB36, used by the Ordnance Survey.) Geo-coordinates	Entry number (Note: The "List Entry Number" is a unique number assigned to each listed building and scheduled monument by Historic England.)	Image
Church of Saint John the Baptist	Alkborough	Church	Mid 11th century	6 November 1967	SE8820121891; 53°41′10″N 0°39′57″W	1241758	Church of Saint John the Baptist More images
Church of St Mary	Barnetby le Wold	Parish Church	C11-C12	6 November 1967	TA0615209074; 53°34′03″N 0°23′55″W	1103677	Church of St Mary More images
Barrow Hall	Barrow upon Humber	House	18th century	6 November 1967	TA0663420551; 53°40′14″N 0°23′15″W	1288451	Upload Photo
Church of Holy Trinity	Barrow upon Humber	Parish Church	13th century	6 November 1967	TA0721421433; 53°40′42″N 0°22′42″W	1346864	Church of Holy Trinity More images
Church of St Mary	Barton-upon-Humber	Church	Norman	21 September 1966	TA0334522021; 53°41′04″N 0°26′12″W	1346773	Church of St Mary More images
Church of St Peter	Barton-upon-Humber	Church	C9	21 September 1966	TA0347821949; 53°41′02″N 0°26′05″W	1083103	Church of St Peter More images
Church of All Saints	Church Town, Belton	Parish Church	C14-C15	1 March 1967	SE7829006336; 53°32′52″N 0°49′12″W	1083293	Church of All Saints More images
Church of St Peter Ad Vincula	Bottesford	Church	13th century	6 November 1967	SE8994507021; 53°33′08″N 0°38′38″W	1083014	Church of St Peter Ad Vincula More images
Grammar School (original Portion)	Brigg	Grammar School	1674	10 October 1952	TA0015707452; 53°33′15″N 0°29′23″W	1083127	Grammar School (original Portion) More images
Church of St Mary	Broughton	Church	1781	6 November 1967	SE9603608625; 53°33′56″N 0°33′05″W	1161801	Church of St Mary More images
Church of St Andrew	Burton upon Stather	Statue	1776	6 November 1967	SE8701617875; 53°39′01″N 0°41′06″W	1103747	Church of St Andrew More images
Normanby Hall	Normanby Park, Burton upon Stather	Country House	1825-1830	19 October 1951	SE8873016534; 53°38′16″N 0°39′34″W	1103752	Normanby Hall More images
Church of All Saints	Cadney	Parish Church	Mid 12th century	6 November 1967	TA0169503354; 53°31′01″N 0°28′04″W	1083706	Church of All Saints More images
Newstead Priory Farmhouse and Screen Wall Adjoining to Left	Cadney	Farmhouse	Early 19th century	19 October 1951	TA0000804457; 53°31′38″N 0°29′34″W	1346518	Upload Photo
Church of St Oswald	Crowle	Cross	Anglo-Scandinavian	1 March 1967	SE7715312985; 53°36′28″N 0°50′07″W	1346672	Church of St Oswald More images
Church of Saint Peter	East Halton	Parish Church	13th century	6 November 1967	TA1414618452; 53°39′00″N 0°16′28″W	1103729	Church of Saint Peter More images
Chest Tomb to Samuel Wesley Approximately 3 Metres South of Chancel of Church of St Andrew	Epworth	Grave Slab	1735	10 September 1987	SE7838604001; 53°31′37″N 0°49′08″W	1083273	Upload Photo
Church of St Andrew	Epworth	Manor House	Late C12-early 13th century	1 March 1967	SE7837804010; 53°31′37″N 0°49′09″W	1068692	Church of St Andrew More images
The Old Rectory	Epworth	House	1956-7	27 September 1951	SE7851503578; 53°31′23″N 0°49′02″W	1068805	The Old Rectory More images
Church of St Lawrence	Frodingham	Church	12th century	7 November 1966	SE8910910841; 53°35′12″N 0°39′19″W	1083610	Church of St Lawrence More images
Church of All Saints	Goxhill	Parish Church	13th century	6 November 1967	TA1022421236; 53°40′34″N 0°19′58″W	1288450	Church of All Saints More images
Medieval Hall Adjoining North East Corner of Goxhill Hall	Goxhill	House	Late C14-early 15th century	19 October 1951	TA1095220517; 53°40′10″N 0°19′20″W	1288428	Medieval Hall Adjoining North East Corner of Goxhill Hall More images
Church of St Nicholas	Haxey	Gate	1827	1 March 1967	SK7647199834; 53°29′23″N 0°50′56″W	1241103	Church of St Nicholas More images
Church of Saint Maurice	Horkstow	Parish Church	13th century	6 November 1967	SE9872118225; 53°39′04″N 0°30′28″W	1103736	Church of Saint Maurice More images
Church of St Oswald	Althorpe, Keadby with Althorpe	Parish Church	1483	1 March 1967	SE8347809625; 53°34′36″N 0°44′27″W	1083258	Church of St Oswald More images
Church of St Andrew	Kirton in Lindsey	Church	C11-C12	6 November 1967	SK9341598559; 53°28′32″N 0°35′38″W	1083025	Church of St Andrew More images
Church of Saint Denys	North Killingholme	Parish Church	12th century	6 November 1967	TA1448117357; 53°38′25″N 0°16′12″W	1103701	Church of Saint Denys More images
Church of St Martin	Owston Ferry	Bailey	Late 13th century	1 March 1967	SE8047800293; 53°29′36″N 0°47′18″W	1083261	Church of St Martin More images
Church of St Andrew	Redbourne	Parish Church	C14-C15	6 January 1987	SK9734099944; 53°29′14″N 0°32′04″W	1346524	Church of St Andrew More images
Church of St Mary	Roxby cum Risby	Church	C11-C12	6 November 1967	SE9206517019; 53°38′30″N 0°36′32″W	1260342	Church of St Mary More images
Scawby Hall	Scawby	Country House	c. 1603	6 November 1967	SE9688005718; 53°32′21″N 0°32′23″W	1083683	Scawby Hall More images
Abbot's Lodge	Thornton Curtis	Abbey/Farmhouse	17th century	6 November 1967	TA1178718854; 53°39′15″N 0°18′36″W	1103713	Abbot's Lodge More images
Church of Saint Lawrence	Thornton Curtis	Parish Church	Late C12-early 13th century	6 November 1967	TA0879617874; 53°38′46″N 0°21′20″W	1227786	Church of Saint Lawrence More images
Remains of Thornton Abbey Church and Adjoining Monastic Ranges	Thornton Curtis	Abbey	1148	6 November 1967	TA1180418932; 53°39′18″N 0°18′35″W	1215139	Remains of Thornton Abbey Church and Adjoining Monastic Ranges More images
Thornton Abbey Gatehouse and Wing Walls, Precinct Walls and Barbican	Thornton Curtis	Abbey	C15-C16	6 November 1967	TA1151018967; 53°39′19″N 0°18′51″W	1346859	Thornton Abbey Gatehouse and Wing Walls, Precinct Walls and Barbican More images
Church of Saint Nicholas	Ulceby	Parish Church	C13-C14	6 November 1967	TA1034014606; 53°36′59″N 0°20′00″W	1227927	Church of Saint Nicholas More images
Church of All Saints	Winteringham	Church	C11-12	6 November 1967	SE9248522458; 53°41′25″N 0°36′03″W	1117040	Church of All Saints More images
Church of All Saints	Winterton	Church	Mid 11th century	6 November 1967	SE9283118590; 53°39′20″N 0°35′49″W	1117004	Church of All Saints More images
Church of St Andrew	Wootton	Parish Church	13th century	6 November 1967	TA0890416172; 53°37′51″N 0°21′17″W	1204699	Church of St Andrew More images
Church of Saint Mary	Wrawby	Parish Church	Late C12-early 13th century	6 November 1967	TA0202808612; 53°33′51″N 0°27′40″W	1281035	Church of Saint Mary More images
Humber Bridge	Barton-upon-Humber	Suspension bridge	1981	12 July 2017	TA0241224487; 53°42′24″N 0°27′00″W	1447321	Humber Bridge More images
