= Grade II* listed buildings in North Lincolnshire =

There are over 20,000 Grade II* listed buildings in England. This page is a list of these buildings in the district of North Lincolnshire in Lincolnshire.

== North Lincolnshire ==
Name	Location	Type	Completed (Note: The date given is the date used by Historic England as significant for the initial building or that of an important part in the structure's description.)	Date designated	Grid ref. (Note: The grid reference is based on the British national grid reference system, sometimes known as OSGB36, used by the Ordnance Survey.) Geo-coordinates	Entry number (Note: The "List Entry Number" is a unique number assigned to each listed building and scheduled monument by Historic England.)	Image
Walcot Old Hall	Alkborough, North Lincolnshire	House	Mid 17th century	6 November 1967	SE8787221011; 53°40′41″N 0°40′16″W	1260341	Walcot Old Hall More images
Church of St Bartholomew	Appleby, North Lincolnshire	Parish Church	13th century	6 November 1967	SE9531215066; 53°37′24″N 0°33′37″W	1083728	Church of St Bartholomew More images
Bardney Hall	Barton-upon-Humber, North Lincolnshire	House	18th century	21 September 1966	TA0330321685; 53°40′53″N 0°26′15″W	1045845	Bardney Hall More images
Baysgarth House	Barton-upon-Humber, North Lincolnshire	House	c. 1731	21 September 1966	TA0322221575; 53°40′50″N 0°26′19″W	1083107	Baysgarth House More images
Gate Piers to Baysgarth and Garden Wall and Attached Lodges to North of the House	Barton-upon-Humber, North Lincolnshire	Gate Pier	19th century	17 September 1976	TA0324421620; 53°40′51″N 0°26′18″W	1346772	Gate Piers to Baysgarth and Garden Wall and Attached Lodges to North of the House
Former National School	Barton-upon-Humber, North Lincolnshire	School	1845	2 September 1992	TA0316822128; 53°41′08″N 0°26′22″W	1252199	Former National School More images
New Hall	Barton-upon-Humber, North Lincolnshire	House	Late 17th century or Early 18th century	21 September 1966	TA0314822289; 53°41′13″N 0°26′22″W	1040019	New Hall More images
Tyrwhitt Hall	Barton-upon-Humber, North Lincolnshire	House	17th century	21 September 1966	TA0353521969; 53°41′02″N 0°26′02″W	1083105	Tyrwhitt Hall More images
51 Fleetgate	Barton-upon-Humber, North Lincolnshire	House	Mid 18th century	17 September 1976	TA0283222309; 53°41′14″N 0°26′40″W	1346844	51 Fleetgate More images
Church of St Andrew	Bonby, North Lincolnshire	Parish Church	12th century	6 November 1967	TA0037215518; 53°37′36″N 0°29′02″W	1346882	Church of St Andrew More images
The Exchange Club	Brigg, North Lincolnshire	House	Mid 18th century	10 October 1952	TA0013207180; 53°33′06″N 0°29′24″W	1083154	The Exchange Club More images
Church of St John the Evangelist	Croxton, North Lincolnshire	Parish Church	13th century	6 November 1967	TA0945012268; 53°35′44″N 0°20′52″W	1204608	Church of St John the Evangelist More images
Church of All Saints	Elsham, North Lincolnshire	Parish Church	C11-C12	6 November 1967	TA0365112550; 53°35′57″N 0°26′07″W	1103684	Church of All Saints More images
Elsham Hall	Elsham, North Lincolnshire	Country House	Earlier than 17th century	6 November 1967	TA0310812014; 53°35′40″N 0°26′37″W	1281128	Elsham Hall More images
Goxhill Hall	Goxhill, North Lincolnshire	Farmhouse	1690-1705	6 November 1967	TA1093520511; 53°40′10″N 0°19′20″W	1346831	Goxhill Hall More images
Hibaldstow Mill and retaining walls to mill pond and wheel race	Hibaldstow, North Lincolnshire	Windmill	1802	6 January 1987	SE9819102765; 53°30′45″N 0°31′15″W	1083709	Hibaldstow Mill and retaining walls to mill pond and wheel race More images
Horkstow Hall	Horkstow, North Lincolnshire	Country House	1776	6 November 1967	SE9856019076; 53°39′32″N 0°30′36″W	1346851	Horkstow Hall More images
Horkstow Suspension Bridge	Horkstow, North Lincolnshire	Suspension Bridge	1834-5	25 September 1979	SE9735618998; 53°39′30″N 0°31′42″W	1214853	Horkstow Suspension Bridge More images
Church of St Helen	Kirmington, North Lincolnshire	Parish Church	13th century	6 November 1967	TA1052111331; 53°35′13″N 0°19′55″W	1204677	Church of St Helen More images
The Long Room	Kirton in Lindsey, North Lincolnshire	Meeting Hall	Mid 19th century	1 September 1989	SK9339998502; 53°28′30″N 0°35′39″W	1346836	Upload Photo
Church of the Holy Trinity	Messingham, North Lincolnshire	Church	13th century	6 November 1967	SE8903304805; 53°31′57″N 0°39′30″W	1346835	Church of the Holy Trinity More images
Manor Farmhouse	North Killingholme, North Lincolnshire	Farmhouse	17th century	19 October 1951	TA1440617669; 53°38′35″N 0°16′15″W	1346854	Manor Farmhouse More images
Flats 1 to 3 Inclusive, Redbourne Hall, Redbourne House	Redbourne, North Lincolnshire	Apartment	Early 18th century	19 October 1951	SK9779099625; 53°29′03″N 0°31′40″W	1083715	Upload Photo
Church of St Hybald	Scawby, North Lincolnshire	Parish Church	C13-C15	6 November 1967	SE9688205635; 53°32′18″N 0°32′23″W	1083718	Church of St Hybald More images
Church of Saint Nicholas	South Ferriby, North Lincolnshire	Parish Church	13th century or earlier	6 November 1967	SE9884520838; 53°40′29″N 0°30′19″W	1288277	Church of Saint Nicholas More images
Thornton Hall, Pavilion Wings and Flanking Screen Walls	Thornton Curtis, North Lincolnshire	Country House	1695-1700	19 October 1951	TA0943918080; 53°38′52″N 0°20′45″W	1103712	Thornton Hall, Pavilion Wings and Flanking Screen Walls More images
Church of St Etheldreda	West Halton, North Lincolnshire	Church	Medieval	6 November 1967	SE9051220838; 53°40′34″N 0°37′53″W	1260344	Church of St Etheldreda More images
Coleby Hall	Coleby, West Halton, North Lincolnshire	House	Mid 17th century	6 November 1967	SE8982419716; 53°39′58″N 0°38′31″W	1241771	Upload Photo
Church of at John	Whitton, North Lincolnshire	Church	C11-12	6 November 1967	SE9025324525; 53°42′34″N 0°38′03″W	1117354	Church of at John More images
The Hall	Winterton, North Lincolnshire	House	Late C18-Early 19th century	17 October 1985	SE9305918536; 53°39′18″N 0°35′36″W	1116900	Upload Photo
Wootton Hall and Adjoining Screen Wall to Right	Wootton, North Lincolnshire	Country House	Later than 1796	6 November 1967	TA0847916361; 53°37′57″N 0°21′39″W	1204691	Upload Photo
Church of Saint Clement	Worlaby, North Lincolnshire	Parish Church	11th century	6 November 1967	TA0153314020; 53°36′46″N 0°28′00″W	1281071	Church of Saint Clement More images
The Old Almshouses	Worlaby, North Lincolnshire	House	C20	19 October 1951	TA0175713982; 53°36′45″N 0°27′48″W	1204723	The Old Almshouses More images
Wrawby Post Mill	Wrawby, North Lincolnshire	Post Mill	Mid - late 18th century	19 October 1951	TA0260708753; 53°33′55″N 0°27′08″W	1083726	Wrawby Post Mill More images
Brumby Hall	North Lincolnshire	Country House	17th century	28 March 1985	SE8884910446; 53°34′59″N 0°39′34″W	1346550	Brumby Hall More images
Church of St John	Scunthorpe, North Lincolnshire	Church	1890	28 March 1985	SE9001211492; 53°35′32″N 0°38′30″W	1083612	Church of St John More images
United Reformed Church	Barton-upon-Humber	Church	1806	21 September 1966	TA0300522039; 53°41′05″N 0°26′31″W	1051598	United Reformed Church More images
