= George Uppleby =

English rower and barrister

George Charles Uppleby (2 May 1819 – 12 October 1891) was an English rower and barrister.

Uppleby was the only son of Rev. George Uppleby, of Bardney Hall, in Barton-upon-Humber, Lincolnshire and his wife Mary Fox. He was educated at Shrewsbury School and admitted to Magdalene College, Cambridge on 16 December 1835. At Cambridge, he rowed in the winning Cambridge boat in the Boat Race in 1840. In 1842 he rowed in the Cambridge Subscription Rooms eight which won the Grand Challenge Cup at Henley Royal Regatta.

Uppleby was admitted at Lincoln's Inn on 3 November 1840 and was called to the Bar in 1844. He lived at Barrow Hall, Barrow-upon-Humber, Lincolnshire and was a deputy lieutenant and justice of the peace for Lincolnshire. He was High Sheriff of Lincolnshire in 1863. He was also a major in the 1st Lincoln Rifle Volunteers in 1867.

Uppleby married firstly Emily Worsley, daughter of the Rev. William Worsley, of Braytoft, Lincolnshire on 23 April 1852 and had children. He married secondly in November 1872, Louisa Golding, third daughter of John Golding of Caenby Hall, Lincolnshire, and had further children. His daughter Laura Violet Uppleby married David George Hogarth.

== See also ==
- List of Cambridge University Boat Race crews

Honorary titles
Preceded by Thomas John Dixon	High Sheriff of Lincolnshire; 1863–1864	Succeeded by William Parker
