= Bardney Hall =

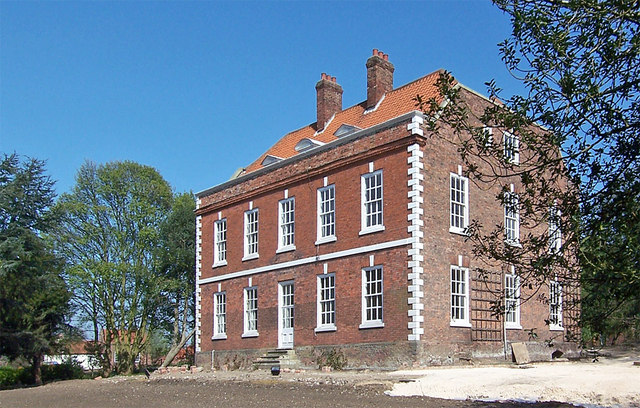

- Location in Lincolnshire
- 53.681306°N 0.43758899°W
- Location: Whitecross Street, Barton-upon-Humber, North Lincolnshire, DN18 5DF, United Kingdom
- OS grid reference: TA 03293 21672

History
- Built: early 18th century

Site notes
- Architectural style: Queen Anne style

Listed Building – Grade II*
- Designated: 21 September 1966
- Reference no.: 1045845

Bardney Hall is an 18th-century residence and a Grade II* Listed building in Barton-upon-Humber, North Lincolnshire. It was constructed as a private residence for William Gildas in the early 1700s and is now used as an events and wedding venue.

== History and residents ==
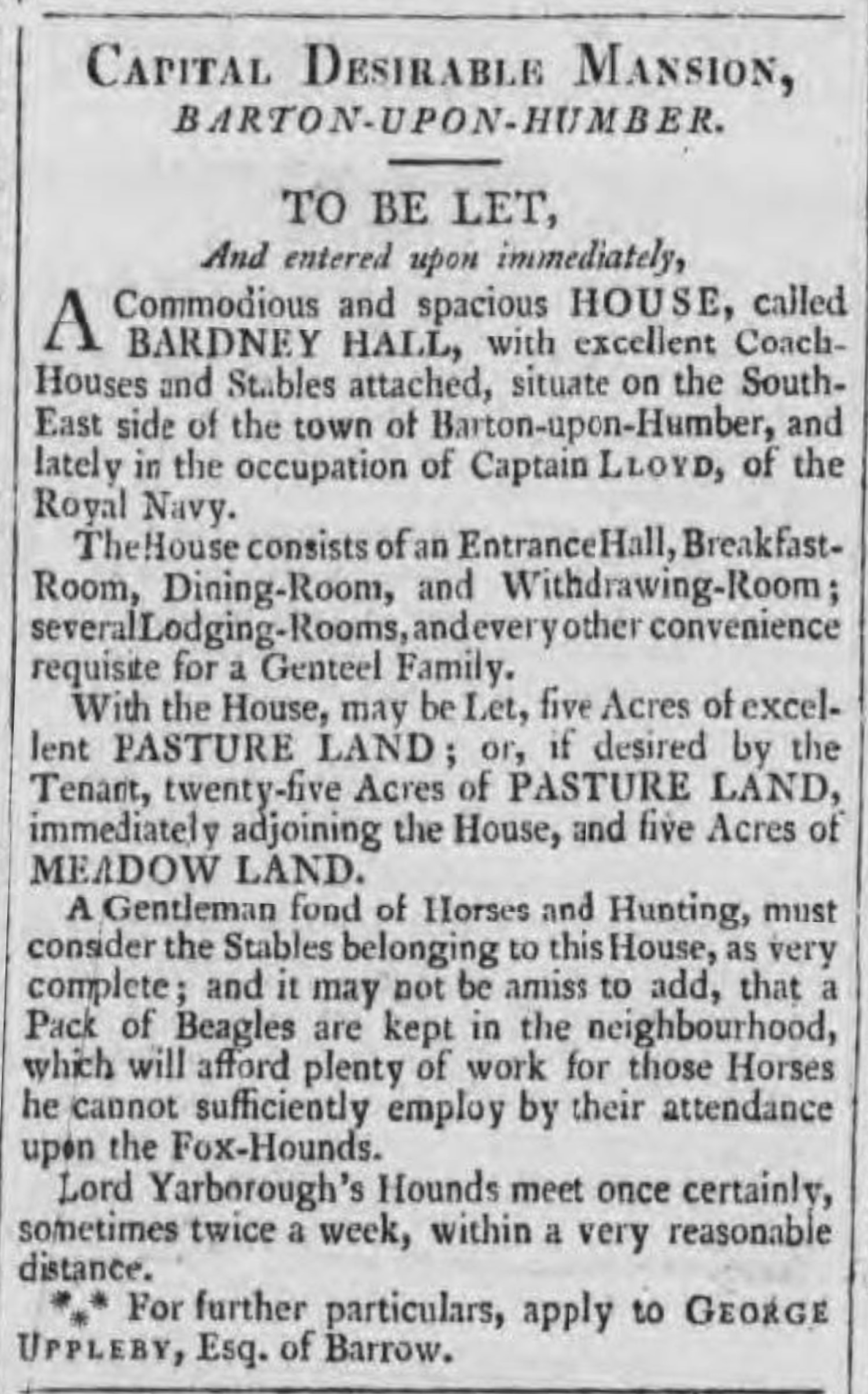
Rental notice for Bardney Hall in 1808

William Gildas (died 1724) lived in the hall with his wife Susannah (1683–1734); they left the property to their son William Gildas (1711–1780) who in 1763 was appointed as Sheriff. He and his wife Sarah had one surviving child, Bridget who, in 1756 married, Charles Robinson. Bridget and Charles had one child named Sarah Robinson (1758–1832) and it was to her that William Gildas left his property when he died in 1780. In 1778 she married George Uppleby (1751–1816) and Bardney Hall was passed to the Uppleby family.

The Uppleby family retained ownership of the property for many years. Their principle residence was Barrow Hall and for some time they rented the house to wealthy tenants. A rental notice for 1808 is shown. Sarah and George had two sons and the eldest Charles Uppleby (1780–1853) inherited Bardney Hall when his father died in 1816. However he did not move there but continued to live at Barrow Hall. Instead his younger brother Reverend George Uppleby (1789–1852) who was the vicar of Barton-upon-Humber lived there with is his wife Mary Fox (1796–1857).

Charles Uppleby did not marry and when he died in 1853 Bardney Hall was inherited by his nephew George Charles Uppleby (1819–1891) who was the son of Reverend George Uppleby. He moved to the Hall for several years with his mother Mary Fox but when she died in 1857 the house was rented out. However, by about 1860 Julia Abigail Holt (1828–1912) the sister of George Charles Uppelby came with her husband Rev George William Holt (1810–1891) to live at the Hall. She remained there for the next fifty years until her death in 1912. At this stage George Crowle Uppleby, the son of George Charles Uppleby (d. 1891) was the owner of the property and he rented it to wealthy tenants. The first tenants were William Wastell Whytehead (1848–1920) who was an attorney and his wife Jessie. They lived there until about 1920. In 1927 he sold it to the Catholic Church who used it as a convent school.
