= All Saints Church, Winterton =

Coordinates: 53.655590°N 0.596864°W

Church of All Saints, Winterton
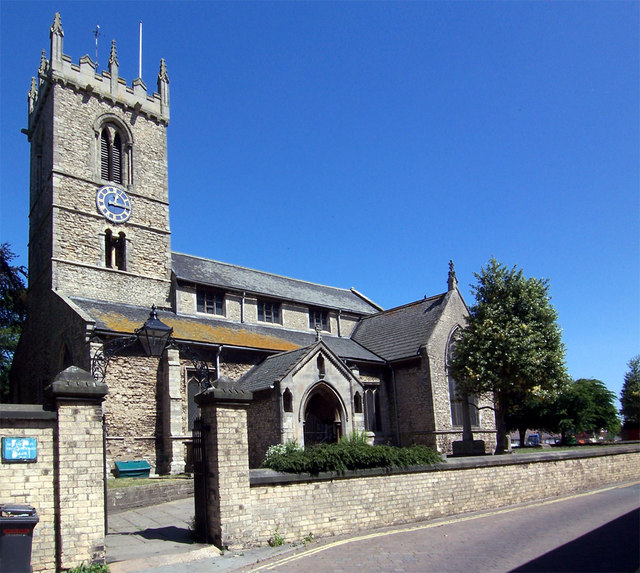
- The Church of All Saints, Winterton

- Location in Lincolnshire
- OS grid reference: SE 928 186
- Location: Winterton, Lincolnshire
- Country: England
- Denomination: Anglican
- Website: All Saints Church, Winterton

Architecture
- Functional status: Active
- Heritage designation: Grade I Heritage at Risk
- Designated: 6 November 1967
- Architectural type: Church

Specifications
- Materials: Ancaster Stone; Roofs slated

Administration
- Diocese: Lincoln

Clergy
- Bishop: The Rt Rev. Christopher Lowson
- Vicar: Rev. Alice Nunn

All Saints Church is an Anglican church in the town of Winterton, England. It is recorded in the National Heritage List for England as a designated Grade I listed building. The church stands close to the center of the town within a Conservation Area, 6 miles (10 km) north of Scunthorpe, to the west of the A15 road. The church is a constituent of the Historic England Heritage at Risk Register and has a priority category of C, signifying slow decay.

As of 2018, the church is an active place of worship and local social hub, serving a community of almost 5,000 people. In addition to twice weekly Anglican services, the church hosts a Roman Catholic service each Saturday.

== History ==
The church was built in around 1080, following the Norman conquest of England, over an earlier Anglo Saxon church, part of which remains in the west wall.

The lower section of the tower and nave are 11th century. Further additions were made to the tower in the Anglo-Norman period and 13th century. The tower reached its present height in 1903. Other additions and alterations have taken place throughout the buildings history including a new south door, a north porch and vestry.

Restoration work was undertaken in 1867 to plans by architect George Gilbert Scott. Reordering works were commenced in 1903 by C. Hodgson Fowler and included the 'addition of nave clerestory and tower parapet, rebuilding chancel gable and re-roofing and re-flooring throughout.' Further significant repairs date from the 1950s.

== Contemporary restoration ==
In 2008, a programme of reordering, extension and roof restoration was proposed by the Winterton Parochial Church Council. Following several years of discussion between stakeholders, proposals were drafted by conservation architect Brian Foxley in 2010 and presented at a public meeting the same year. A first stage application for Heritage Lottery Fund funding was made in 2011 and received approval a short time later. Full funding was secured in early 2013.

Following repairs to the slate roof of the nave, it was noted that limestone masonry had fallen from the tower walls onto the nave. In February 2015, as a safety precaution, the church yard was closed to the public and a condition survey was carried out by Historic England, resulting in an entry for the church on the Heritage at Risk register.

Urgent repair works were proposed, resulting in the suspension of the planned extension project. Further funding was secured from the Heritage Lottery Fund for the restorative work. A covered walkway was installed to allow the church to remain open for worship and community activities whilst repairs were carried out.

Work to repair and repoint the tower commenced in early 2018. Following raking out of decaying cementitious mortar, a bespoke formulation of lime mortar was utilised so as to allow the evaporation of moisture from the building fabric and to prevent further degradation of the limestone.

Additional works taking place over the same period included a replacement gable window tracery for the south transept, a replacement lead roof for the tower and renewal of the external rainwater drainage system.

== Architecture ==
Overall, the church consists of a west tower, inter-connected nave with arcade columns separating aisles to the north and south, which flank the tower and incorporate a choir vestry and meeting room to the western end. The church has transepts to both the north and south. A substantial chancel, complete with clergy vestry to the north, is located at the eastern end. The church organ is housed within the choir on the north side. There are porches to both the north and south, the primary entrance being to the south. The ground floor plan has been largely unaltered since the 13th century.

The church has a uniquely designed "Lincolnshire Romanesque Tower", one of only 60 such towers known to have been built.

Pevsner, Harris et al. describe the tower as follows: "C11 W tower (two stages divided by a chamfered string course) embraced by the later aisles. Bell-openings with mid-wall shafts as usual. Cushion capitals on the s face enriched with chequer pattern. Above the bell-openings a further chamfered string course and circular sound holes. Above the Saxo-Norman top an E.E. heightening. Tall twin bell-openings with shaft and nook-shafts. Finally, on top Perp-style battlements and eight pinnacles, of 1904";

== See also ==
- The Church of England
- Diocese of Lincoln
- Grade I listed buildings in North Lincolnshire
- Romanesque Architecture
- Nikolaus Pevsner
