= Church of Holy Trinity, Barrow upon Humber =

Church of Holy Trinity
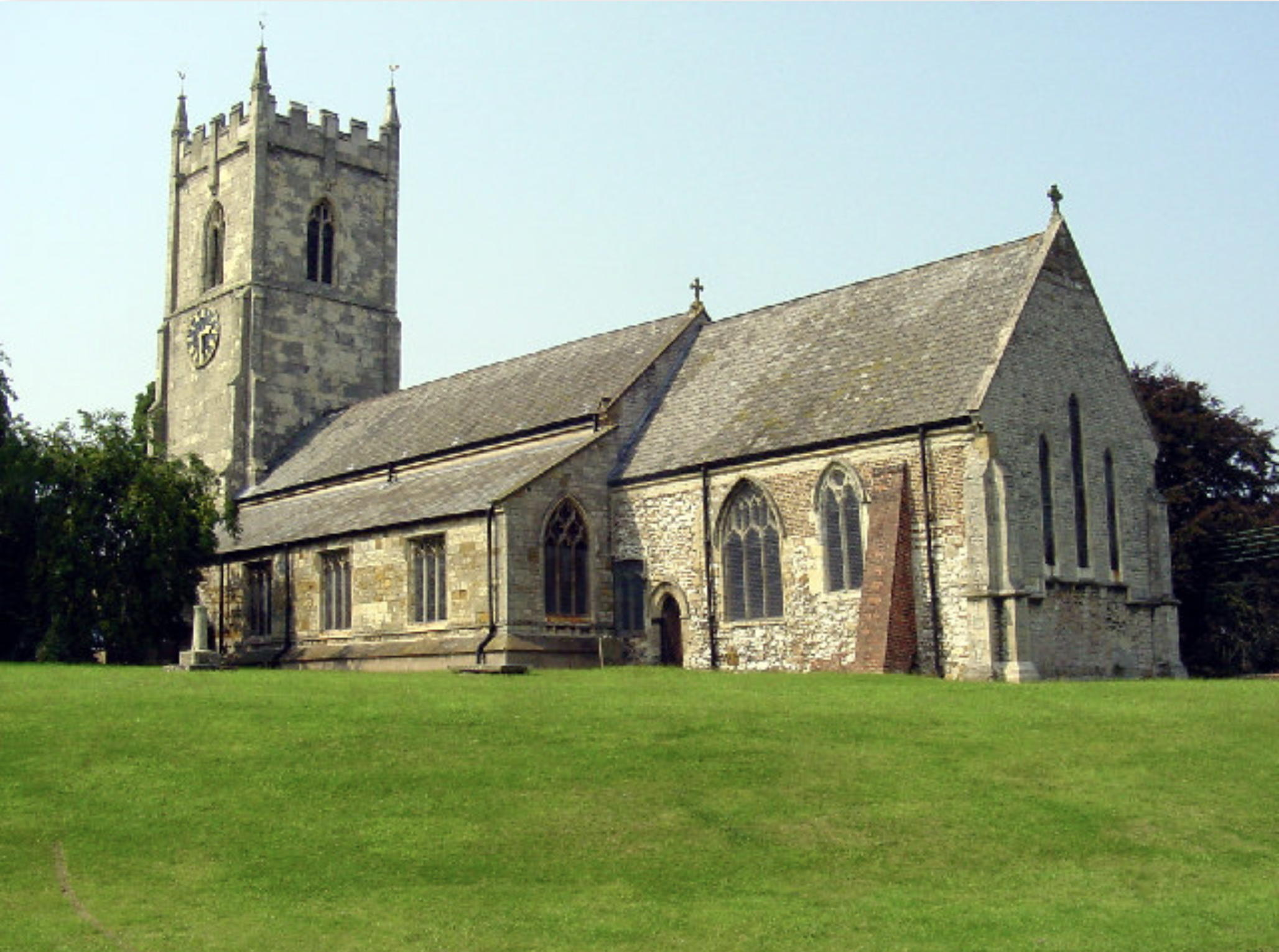
- Church of Holy Trinity
- 53.678372°N 0.37836179°W
- OS grid reference: TA 07214 21433
- Location: Holy Trinity, Thorngarth Lane, Barrow upon Humber, North Lincolnshire, DN19 7AN
- Country: England
- Denomination: Church of England

History
- Status: Church
- Founded: 13th century

Architecture
- Heritage designation: Grade I
- Designated: 6 November 1967

Church of Holy Trinity is an Anglican church and Grade I Listed building in Barrow upon Humber, North Lincolnshire, England.

== Architecture ==
The arcades and chancel date to the 13th century, the tower and aisle are 14th-15th century. The building was restored in the 19th century: in 1841, 1856, and 1868-69 (the latter of which by Kirk and Parry) which involved the rebuilding of the north aisle, the south porch, the roofs of the aisle and the chancel.

=== Monuments ===
Monuments in the chancel include a wall tablet to William Broxholme of 1684, a marble wall tablet to Roger Uppleby of 1780, and a marble wall tablet to George Uppleby of 1816.

== History ==
In the early 18th century, the choirmaster was John Harrison a carpenter and clockmaker who invented the marine chronometer, a long-sought-after device for solving the problem of calculating longitude while at sea.

== Organ ==
The Stamford Mercury of 23 August 1850 records a new organ presented to Barrow church by C. Uppleby Esq containing 14 stops. It contained the following inscription

1850. This organ is lent during the incumbency of the Rev. R.B.Machell to the parish church of Barrow by C. Uppleby, Esq. Thos.Kirke, churchwarden; John Moody, builder.

The fate of this instrument is unclear. In 1946 Henry Groves and Son installed a second-hand instrument from a church in Liverpool. This has 2 manuals and 19 speaking stops.

== Bells ==
The tower contains a ring of 12 bells. The tenor of over 16 cwt dates from 1713 by Edward Seller. The oldest bell is the eleventh, dating from 1636 by George Oldfield. The tenth bell dates from 1882 by John Warner and Sons. The ninth to fifth bells are from 1953 by John Taylor and Co. The third and fourth by Taylors, Eayre and Smith of 2007, and the treble and second by the same company from 2008.

== Gallery ==
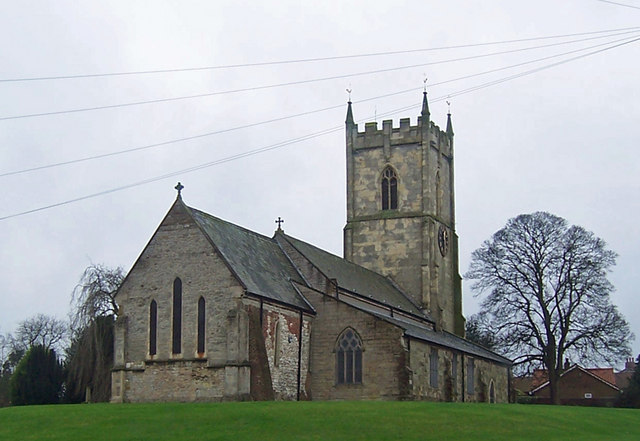

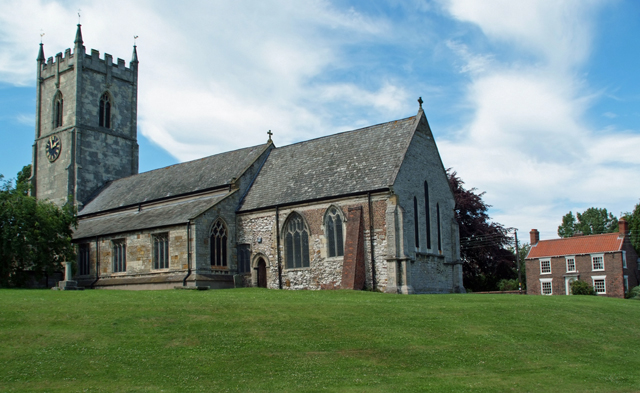

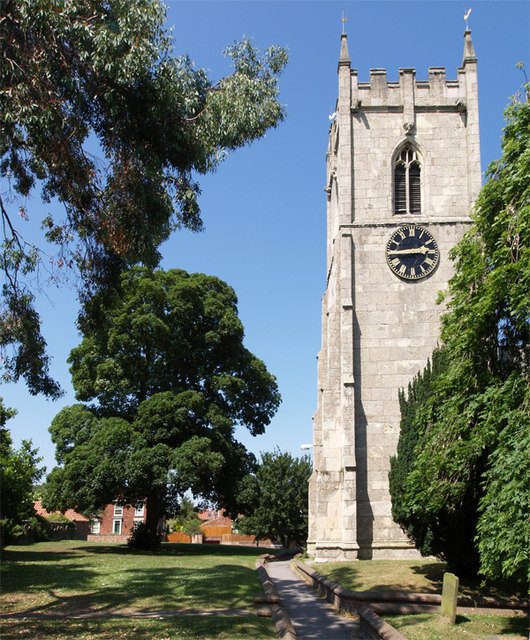

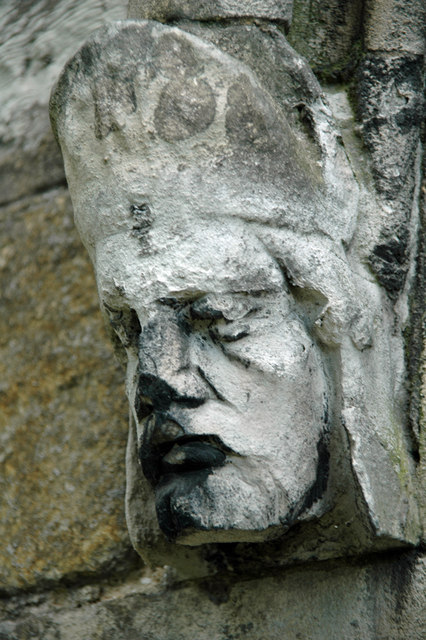

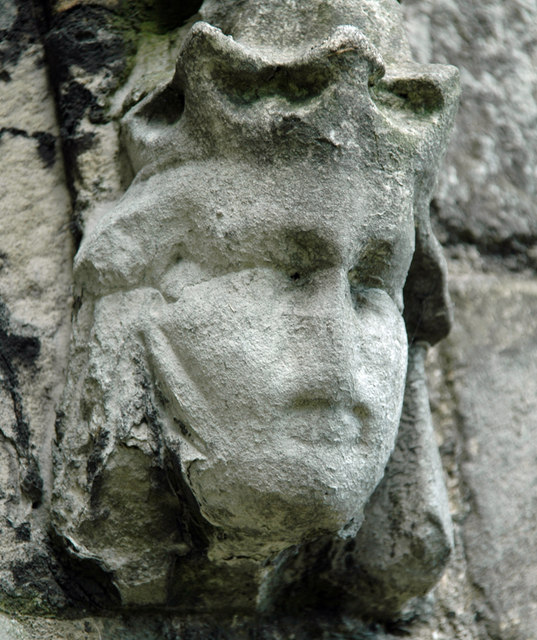
