= St Maurice's Church, Horkstow =

St Maurice's Church
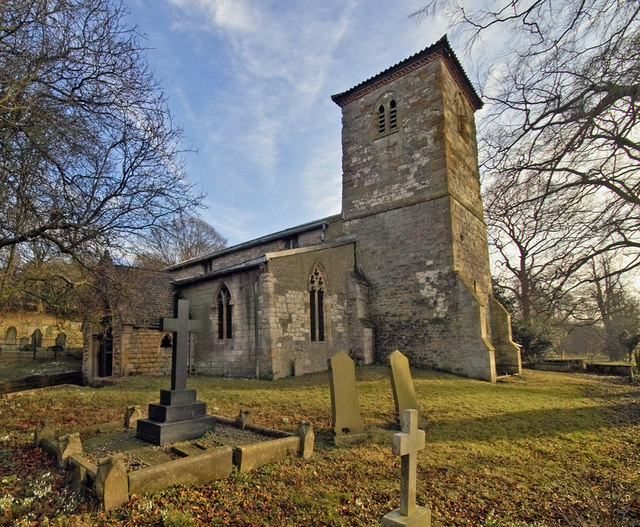
- St Maurice's Church
- 53.651199°N 0.50795004°W
- OS grid reference: SE 98721 18225
- Location: Main Street, Horkstow, North Lincolnshire
- Country: England
- Denomination: Church of England

History
- Status: Church
- Founded: 13th century

Architecture
- Heritage designation: Grade I
- Designated: 6 November 1967

St Maurice's Church is an Anglican church and Grade I Listed building in Horkstow, North Lincolnshire, England.

== History ==
The tower, nave, arcades, chancel, and north aisle of the parish church date to at least the 13th century. The south aisle and clerestory are later, dating to the 14th and 15th centuries. Various repairs and reconstructions were undertaken from the 17th to 19th centuries. An interior restoration of 1868 included a reseating of the church at a cost of £450. A restoration to the exterior was undertaken in 1895.

=== Monuments ===
Within the church is an oval, marble tablet to Catherine Ayers dating to 1759, and at the east end of the nave, one to Rear Admiral Thomas Shirley (leader of Shirley's Gold Coast expedition), dated to 1814, and one to Colonel John Tufnell, dated 1838.

== Gallery ==
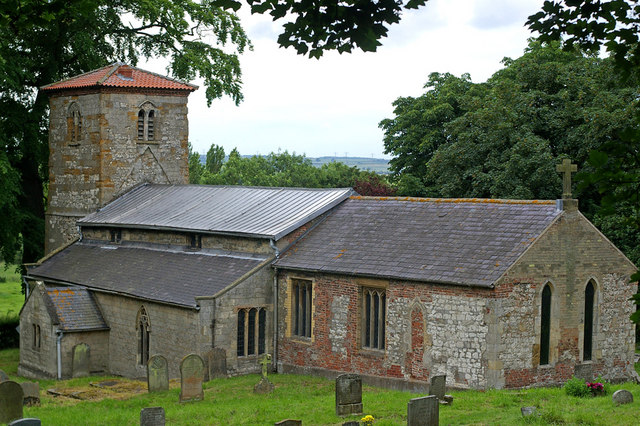

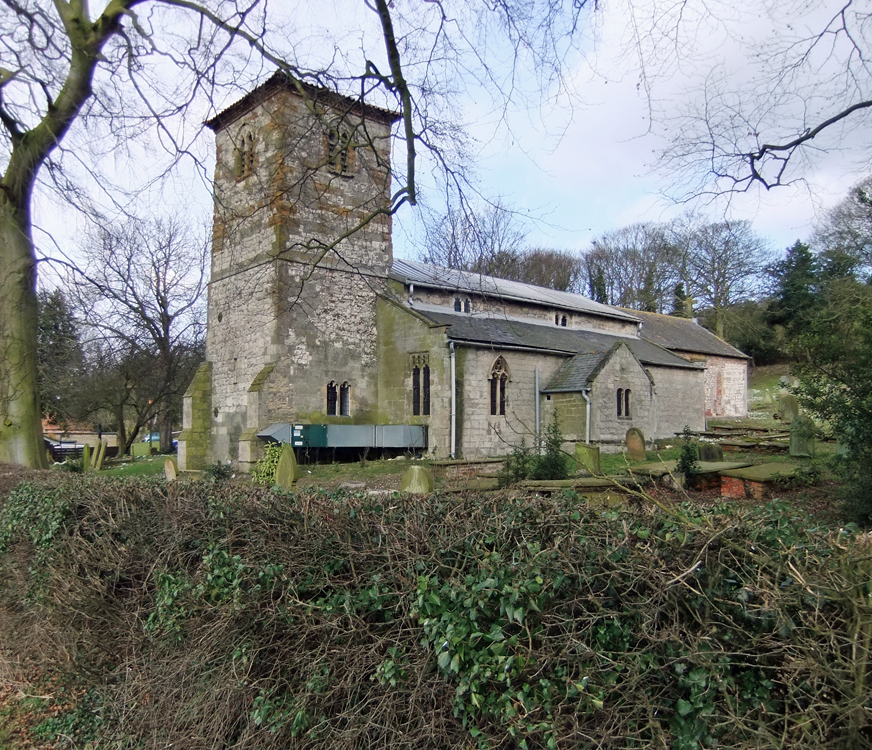

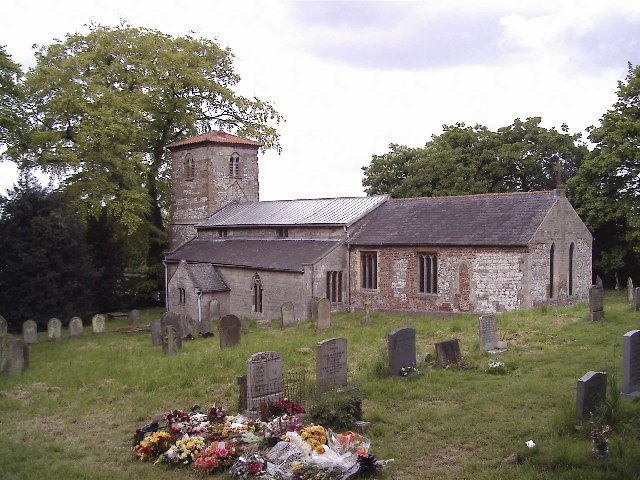

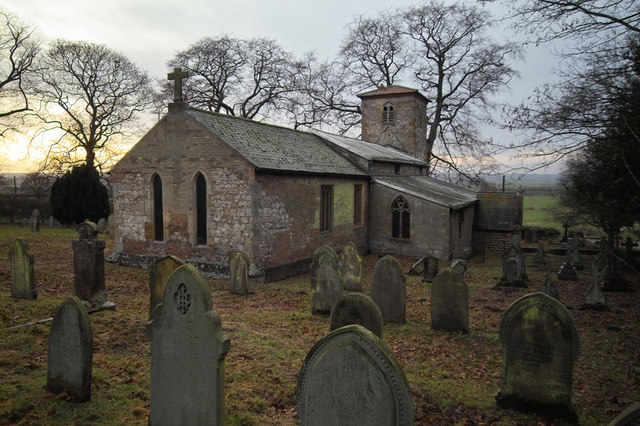

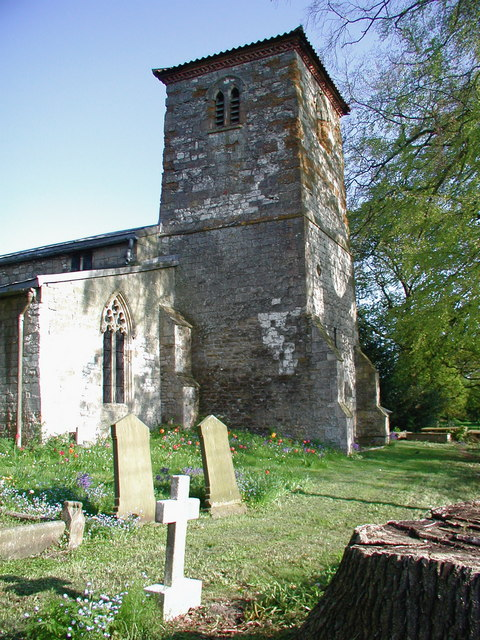
