= Wrawby Windmill =

Windmill in Lincolnshire, England

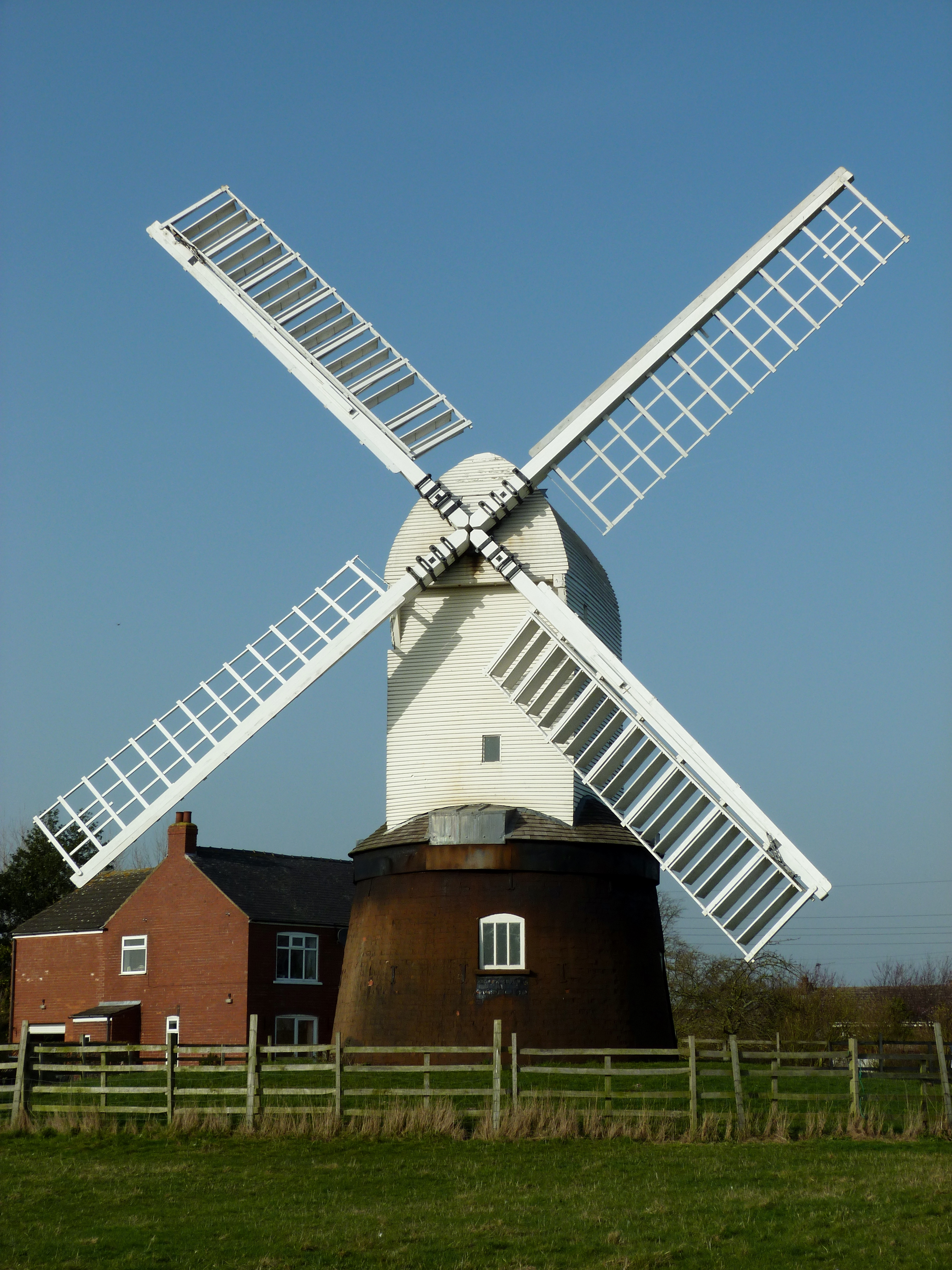
- Wrawby Windmill, March 2014
- Interactive map of Wrawby Windmill

Origin
- Coordinates: 53°33′55″N 0°27′08″W
- Year built: Late 18th century

Information
- Purpose: Corn mill
- Type: Midlands post mill
- Roundhouse storeys: Single storey roundhouse
- No. of sails: Four
- Type of sails: Two Common sails, two Spring sails (previously four Spring sails)
- Winding: Tailpole

Wrawby Postmill is a windmill at Wrawby near Brigg, in North Lincolnshire, England.

The mill is the last post mill in the north of England, and was built between 1760 and 1790 to serve the Elsham Hall estate. Originally it had four common sails, but through most of its working life had a more usual combination of two common and two spring sails, providing power with flexibility. It was working until the 1940s, when it had four spring sails, before becoming derelict. Following the possibility of its demolition, it was acquired and restored in 1962 by Wrawby Windmill Preservation Society. It was returned to working order in 1965 with new sails and a new set of stones. Maintenance work in 2008, which returned the mill to mixed sail types, was funded by the SPAB Mill Repairs Fund and local residents.

The mill is the last working post mill in Northern England, and is open to the public. The mill also contains a small museum of milling tools, and holds milling demonstrations. The windmill was Grade II* listed in 1951.
