= 51 Fleetgate =

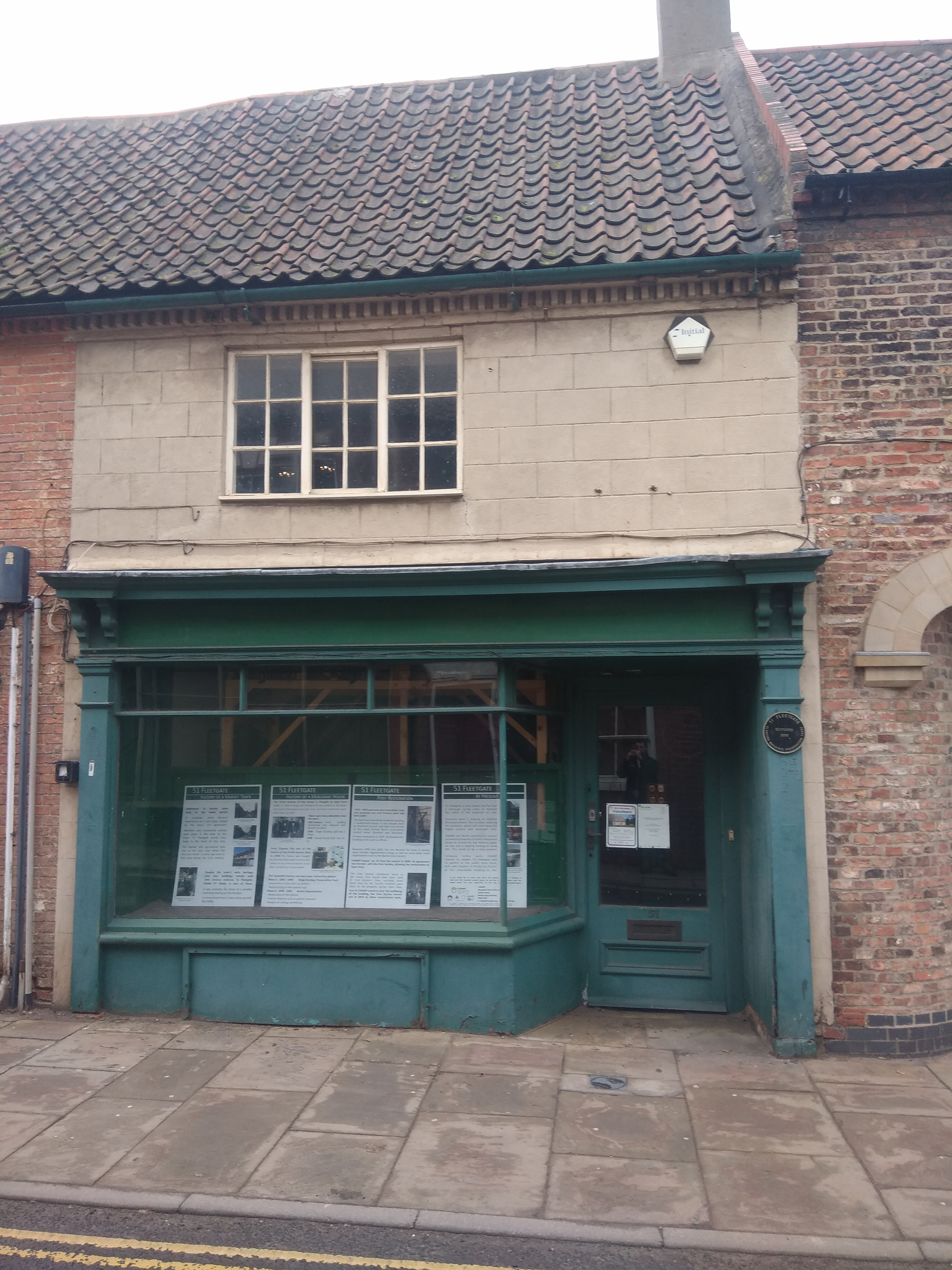

- Location in Lincolnshire
- 53.6876°N 0.444094°W
- Location: 51 Fleetgate, Barton-upon-Humber, North Lincolnshire, DN18 5QA, United Kingdom
- OS grid reference: TA 0285 2238

History
- Built: c.1325

Listed Building – Grade II*
- Designated: 17 September 1976
- Reference no.: 1346844

51 Fleetgate in Barton-upon-Humber is a Grade II* Listed building with parts dating back to the 14th century. It is considered to be the oldest surviving residential building in North Lincolnshire.

== History and use ==
The building is Medieval with multiple later alterations. The front range dates to the 14th Century, with 18th Century rebuilding included. This front range was originally continuous with the adjacent buildings (numbers 47 and 49 Fleetgate). A 19th century shopfront remains extant.

In 1900 the front was split into three shops; number 51 Fleetgate was owned by the Clipson family who used it as a barber shop and tobacconist.

The Clipson family owned the property until 1990 when it was purchased by Glanford Borough Council. The house was operated by the Brigg Heritage Preservation Trust who restructured the upstairs hall and restored other parts of the house. It was then bought back by the Council and subsequently transferred to North Lincolnshire Council in 1996. The restoration of the building is recorded on a plaque dating to 1996 on the building's exterior. The building was subsequently used as offices and by the Barton Civic Society until 2009 when it was leased to a local heritage group called CHAMP, who provided public access to the building as a heritage site.

=== Significance ===
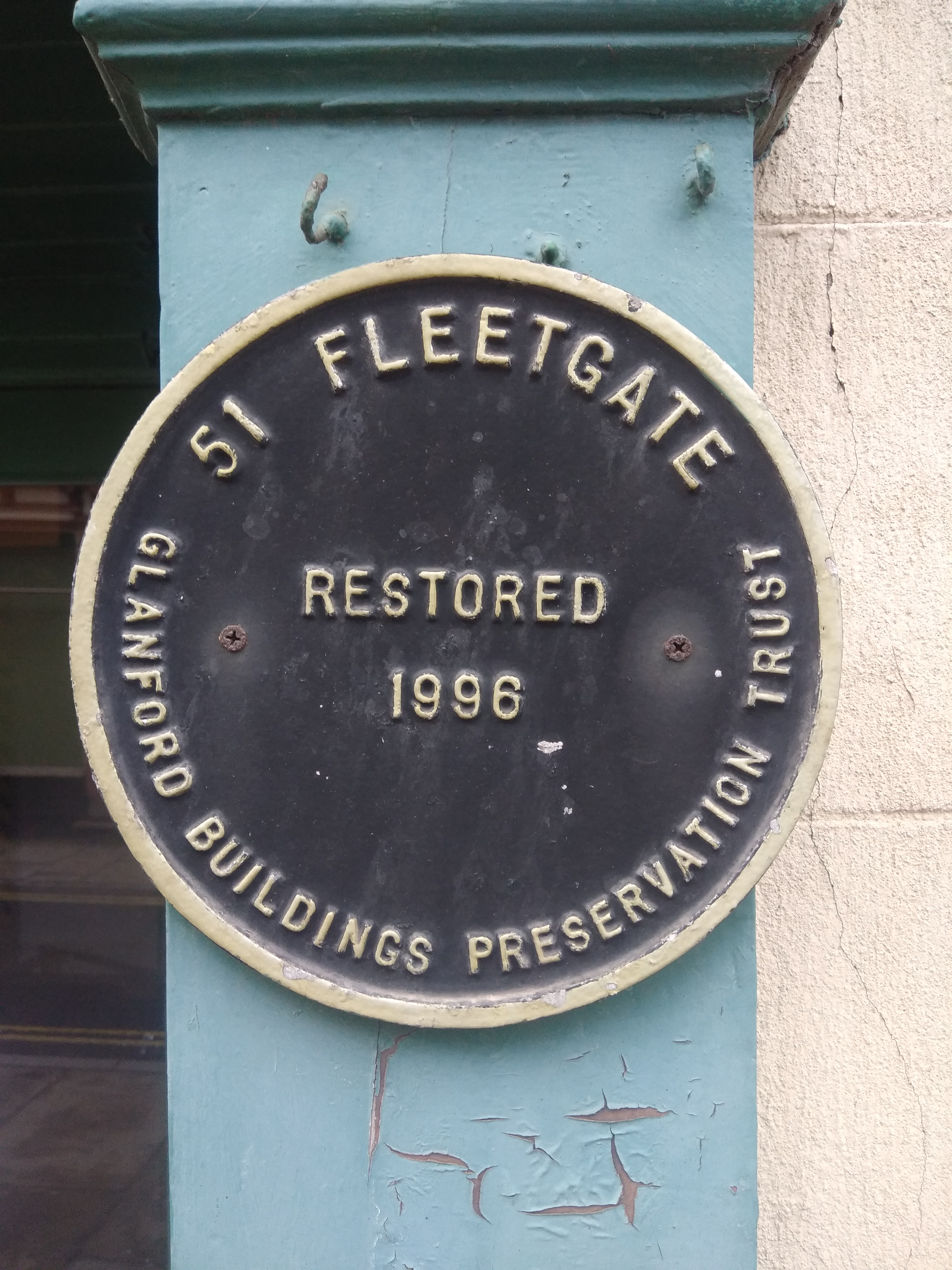
Plaque recording the restoration in 1996

51 Fleetgate is the most complete example of a medieval town house in the region and one of very few in Lincolnshire and the East Riding of Yorkshire outside of Lincoln and Beverley. The timber framing may be compared with (now demolished) examples recorded from Hull as well as extant buildings in York.
