= Brumby Hall =

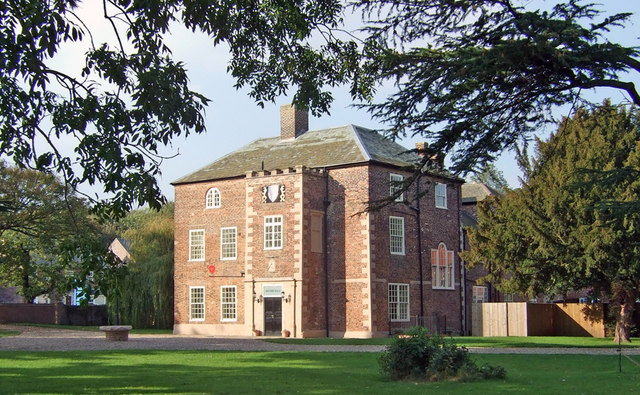

- Location in Lincolnshire
- 53.583086°N 0.65940207°W
- Location: Brumby Hall, Brumby Wood Lane, Scunthorpe, North Lincolnshire, United Kingdom
- OS grid reference: SE 88849 10446

History
- Built: 17th century

Listed Building – Grade II*
- Designated: 28 March 1985
- Reference no.: 1346550

Brumby Hall is a late 17th-century residence and a Grade II* Listed building in Scunthorpe, North Lincolnshire.

== History ==
The hall was constructed in the 17th century; a sundial dated to 1637 is present onsite. It was extended in the late 18th century by George Pycock for Thomas Pindar, and further altered and extended in the 19th and 20th centuries. In the early 17th century, the hall was home to Richard Bellingham (later Governor of the Massachusetts Bay Colony), and latterly to Nathaniel Fiennes.

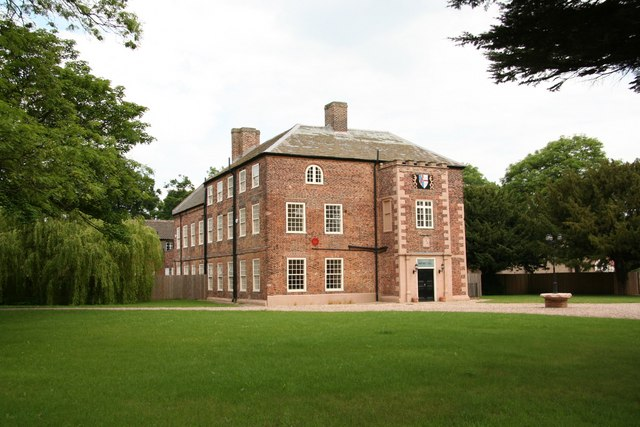
Brumby Hall

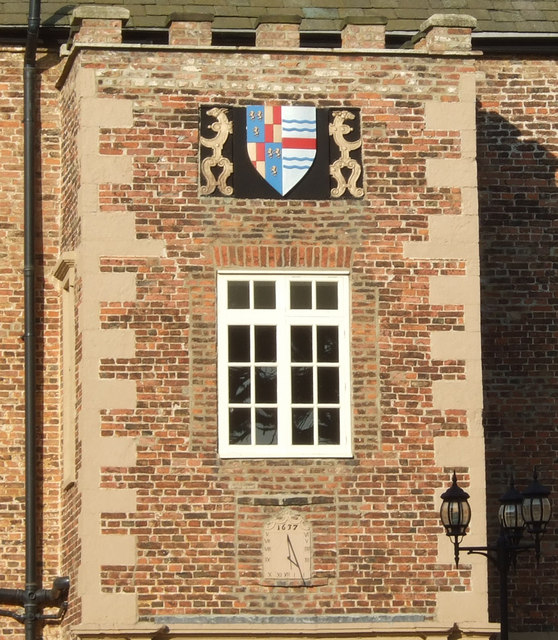
Crest and sundial

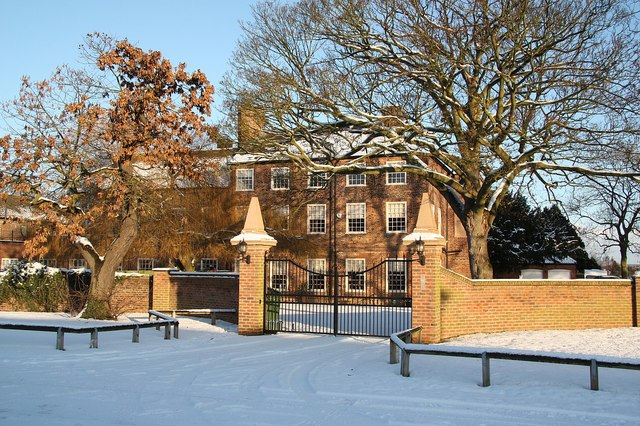
Gates
