= Goxhill Hall =

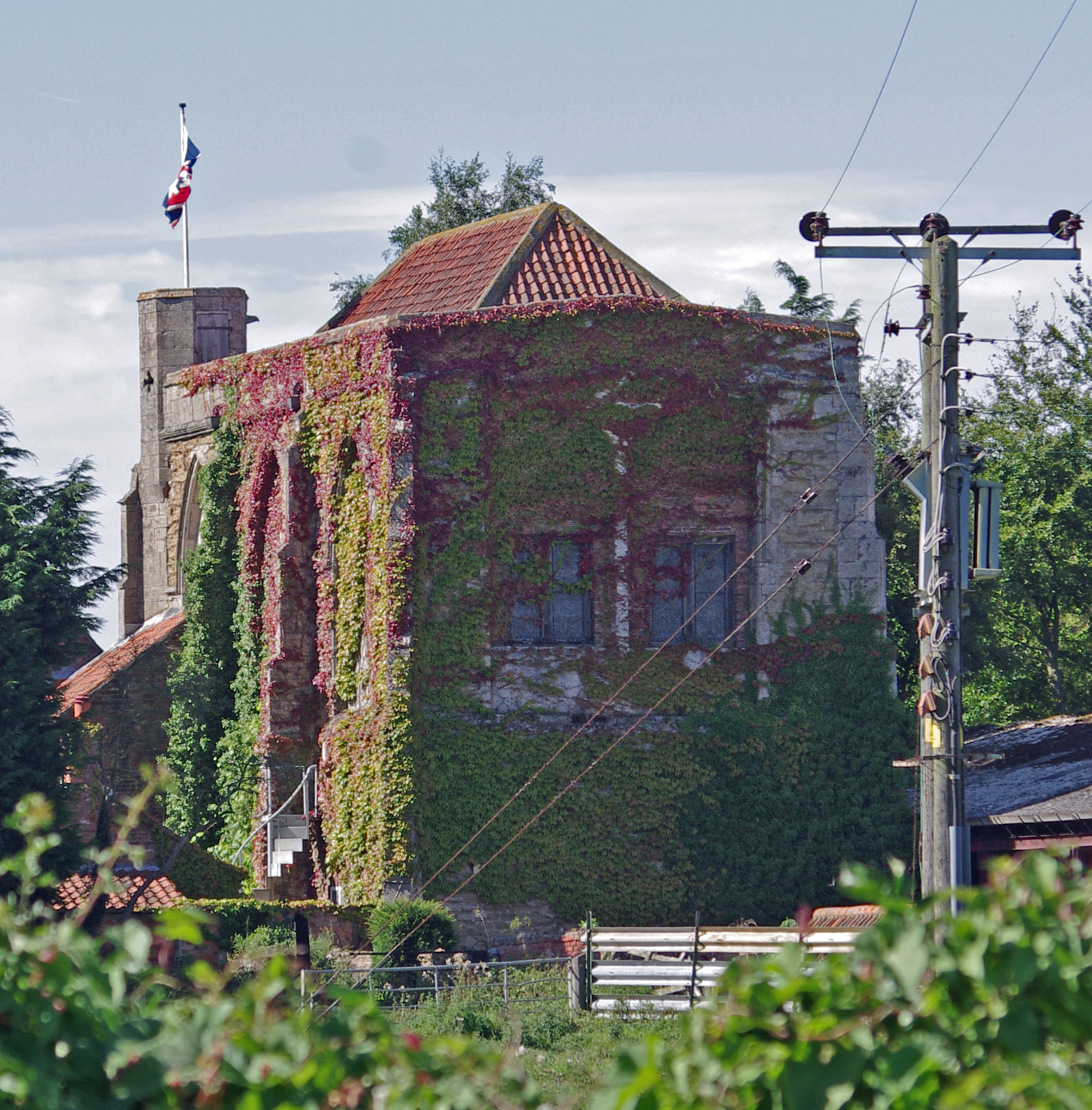
- The Medieval hall, adjoining the 17th Century Goxhill Hall

- Location in Lincolnshire
- 53.669313°N 0.32234972°W
- Location: South End, Goxhill, North Lincolnshire, DN18 5HL, United Kingdom
- OS grid reference: TA 10935 20511

History
- Built: 1690-1705
- Built for: Henry Hildyard

Listed Building – Grade II*
- Designated: 6 November 1967
- Reference no.: 1346831

Goxhill Hall is a late 17th-century residence and a Grade II* Listed building in Goxhill, North Lincolnshire. A 14th to 15th-century Medieval hall joins onto the north-east corner of Goxhill Hall. This earlier structure was part of a larger complex and is a Grade I Listed building.

== History and design ==
The hall was built between 1690 and 1705 for Henry Hildyard and was renovated in the late 20th century. It is constructed in two storeys of red brick with blue brick dressing with a pantile roof and a 5-bay frontage.
