= Wrawby =

Village in Lincolnshire, England

Coordinates: 53.564170°N 0.461705°W

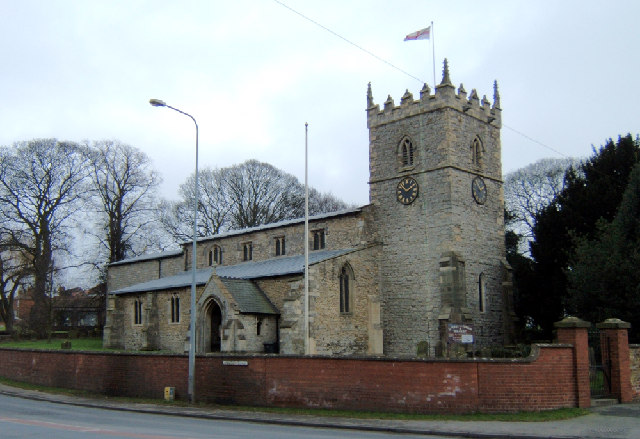
- St Mary the Virgin, Wrawby

- Location within Lincolnshire
- Population: 1,469 (2011)
- OS grid reference: TA019086
  - London: 145 mi (233 km) S
- Unitary authority: North Lincolnshire
- Ceremonial county: Lincolnshire
- Region: Yorkshire and the Humber
- Country: England
- Sovereign state: United Kingdom
- Post town: Brigg
- Postcode district: DN20
- Dialling code: 01652
- Police: Humberside
- Fire: Humberside
- Ambulance: East Midlands
- UK Parliament: Brigg and Immingham

Wrawby is a village in North Lincolnshire, England. It lies 2 miles (3 km) east of Brigg and close to Humberside Airport, on the A18. The 2001 Census recorded a village population of 1,293, in around 600 homes, which increased to 1,525 at the 2021 census. Wrawby is noted for its postmill.

== History ==
The village is shown as "Waregebi" in the Domesday Book, a name thought to derive from Old Danish, meaning "Wraghi's farmstead". Alternatively it may derive from the Norse warg, which means wolf, or be related to an old Swedish dialect word "vrage", meaning "mooring post". Domesday Book records that the village consisted of a church with a priest and farmland, meadow land and woodland.

The oldest surviving building is the Church of St Mary, which is probably Anglo-Saxon in origin. The current structure has a 13th-century tower and pillars. The font is 14th-century with a carved Jacobean cover. The advowson of the church was donated to Clare Hall, Cambridge by Elizabeth de Burgo in 1348. There is an altar tomb of the Tyrwhitt family, lords of the manor until the mid-17th century. (The role was then assumed by the Elwes family.) A tapestry of "Christ blessing little children" hangs in the church. Its manufacturer, Thomas Tapling of London, who was born in the village, donated it. He also endowed the Parish Reading Room (now demolished), hoping to provide the villagers the opportunity of an education.

The Tyrwhitts held the lordship from late medieval times, and in 1542 Robert Tyrwhitt is believed to have entertained Henry VIII lavishly at the manor house in nearby Kettleby. At the north-eastern boundary of Wrawby parish with Melton Ross is the site of an old gallows, reputedly placed there on the order of King James I as a warning to prevent bloodshed between the feuding Ross and Tyrwhitt families.

The parish of Wrawby was enclosed in 1800–1805, with the land being divided between 43 owners, including the Earl of Yarborough, Clare Hall, Cambridge (replacing the title of advowson), and the Elwes family. The greatest of the landowners, the Elwes family, held their estate in Wrawby until 1919.

It was described in 1870–1872 in John Marius Wilson's Imperial Gazetteer of England and Wales:

WRAWBY, a township and a parish in Glanford-Brigg district, Lincoln. The township lies 1½ mile NE of Brigg r. station; and contains W. village and Brigg work house. Real property, £5,258. Pop. in 1851, 931; in 1861, 1,257,-of whom 143 were in the workhouse . Houses, 257.—The parish includes Brigg township, which has a head post-office. Acres, 5,070. Pop. in 1851, 3,132; in 1861, 2,961. Houses, 616. The manor belongs to V. D. H. Cary-Elves, Esq. The living is a vicarage, with Brigg chapelry, in the diocese of Lincoln. Value, £240.* Patron, Clare College, Cambridge. There are-besides the places of worship and the schools in Brigg-Independent and Wesleyan chapels and a national school.

Although education had been provided for some of the Wrawby boys from the foundation of an old grammar school (now within the town of Brigg) in the Tudor period, education for all the children of the village was not readily available until the building of the National School in 1842, at a cost of £433. It was enlarged to accommodate the greater population of the village in 1895. The population had risen from 283 in 1801 to around 1400 in 1891. The school and master's house (now a private house) along with several other houses of the 18th century built of distinctive local brick remain. The local brick kilns on the outskirts of the village were finally demolished in the 1960s.

The graveyard surrounding the church was closed in 1857 when a new cemetery was opened on a larger site on the outskirts of Brigg. The original vicarage house was burnt down in 1713, when all the parish records were lost. The oldest register in existence dates from 1675. A new vicarage was built in 1839; this was demolished in the 1960s.

Wrawby church also served the township of Brigg until a new church was built there in 1872. Wrawby also had an independent chapel (built in 1802), a Wesleyan chapel (built in 1827) and a temperance hall (built in 1849). A Methodist church was built in Chapel Lane and served as a place of worship from 1885 until 2005, when it became a private house.

The village was struck by an F1/T2 tornado on 23 November 1981, as part of the record-breaking nationwide tornado outbreak on that day.

=== Wrawby post mill ===
Wrawby post mill stands on a small hill and can be seen on the approach to Brigg from the A18. The earliest record of a mill in Wrawby is 1585; in the 19th century there are known to have been two. The remaining one was restored to working condition in the 1960s. The mill, high on the Lincolnshire Wolds, is the last surviving post mill in Lincolnshire and indeed in the north of England. It was built around 1760 on the site of an earlier mill, and part of the Elwes estate until 1910, when it was sold. It continued in operation until 1940, when the loss of a sail brought it to a standstill. By 1961 the mill was ready to collapse, but it was saved by a locally formed preservation society. The restored mill reopened in 1965, when it ground its first bag of corn in 25 years. The mill has since been refurbished, the first new sail being added on 1 June 2007 and a second subsequently. There is an intention to replace all four sails.

== Community ==
The village has a church, a primary school, a repair garage, warden-assisted flats for over 50s, a care home for the elderly, and a village hall that opened in the late 1990s to accommodate functions and community activities. The post office, petrol station shop, and fish and chip shop have closed. The one remaining retailer is a farm shop on the main road set up in 1967 to sell local produce.

In recent years some community buildings have been sold for conversion into housing, such as the chapel and the parish rooms. Some farmland has also been sold for housing developments. One such development is Applefields Road.

The village has a junior football team called the Wrawby Rovers. There is a monthly news pamphlet of community activities, Wrawby News, distributed to residents free of charge.

== Notable people ==
In chronological order of birth:

- Michael Wigglesworth (1631–1705), a New England clergyman who wrote the 1662 poem The Day of Doom, was born in Wrawby.
- Rev. Richard William Enraght (1837–1898), religious controversialist, was curate of St Mary's Church, Wrawby, in 1866–1867.
- Joseph Shield Nicholson (1850–1927), economist, was born in Wrawby.
- Carmel McCourt (born 1958), singer, was born in Wrawby.
