= All Saints Church, Goxhill =

All Saints' Church
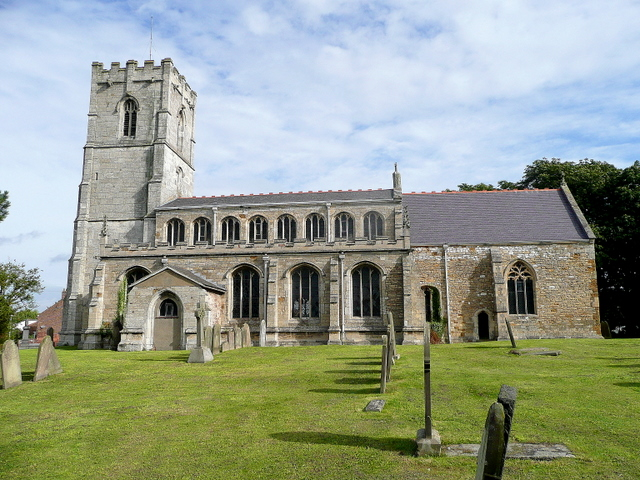
- All Saints' Church
- 53.675977°N 0.33284933°W
- OS grid reference: TA 10224 21236
- Location: All Saints' Church, Church Street, Goxhill, North Lincolnshire, DN19 7HX
- Country: England
- Denomination: Church of England

History
- Status: Church
- Founded: 13th century

Architecture
- Heritage designation: Grade I
- Designated: 6 November 1967

All Saints' Church is an Anglican church and Grade I Listed building in Goxhill, North Lincolnshire, England.

== Architecture ==
The chancel dates to the 13th century AD, and the nave, aisles and tower to the 14th-15th centuries. The floor and plaster was restored in c. 1857 and the aisle, chancel and tower in 18783.

== Gallery ==
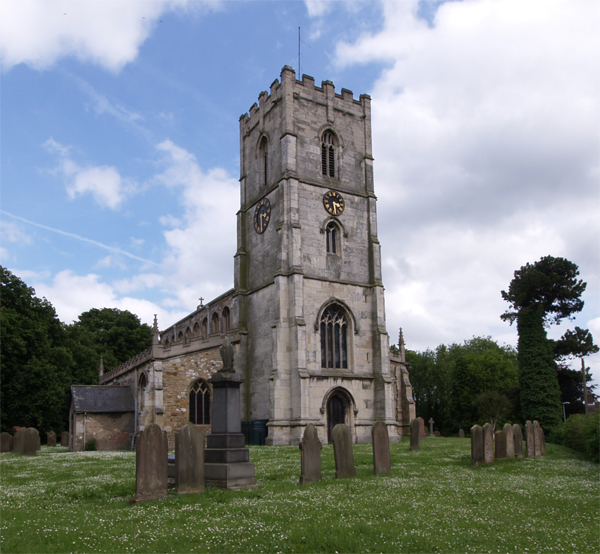

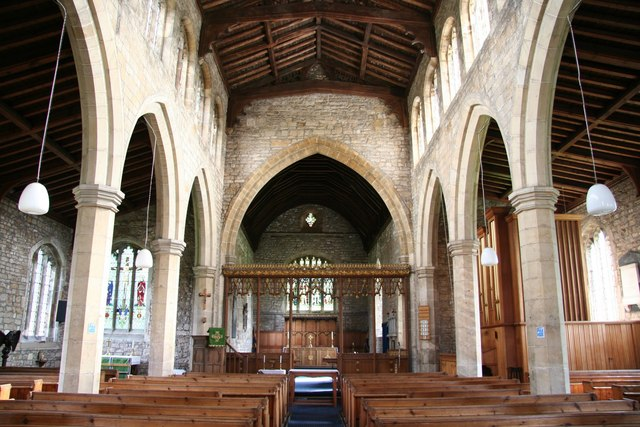

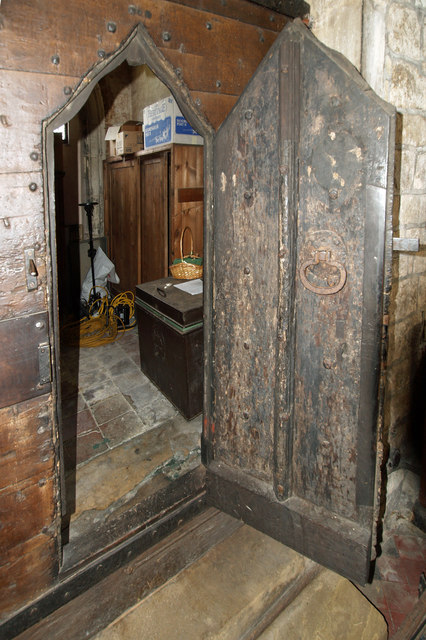

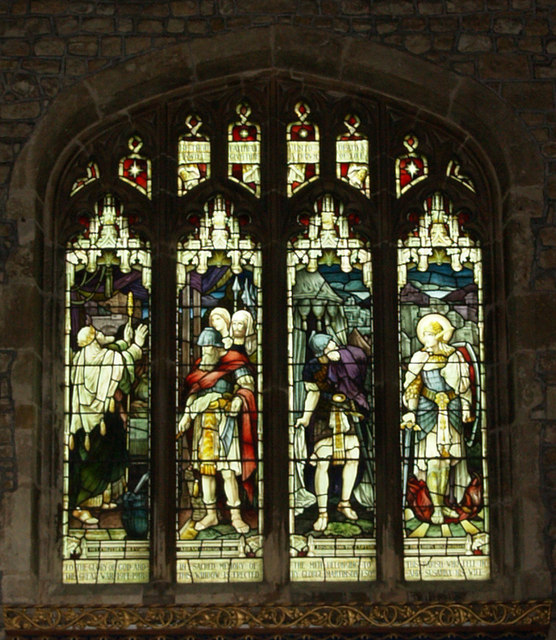
