= Goxhill =

Village in Lincolnshire, England

Coordinates: 53°40′41″N 0°19′58″W

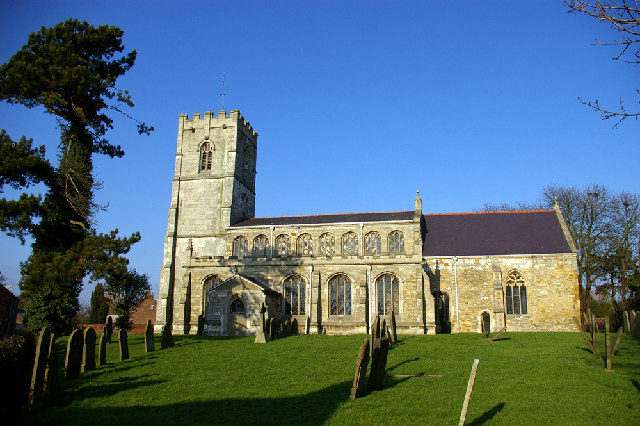
- Church of All Saints, Goxhill

- Location within Lincolnshire
- Population: 2,290 (2011 census)
- OS grid reference: TA102214
  - London: 150 mi (240 km) S
- Civil parish: Goxhill
- Unitary authority: North Lincolnshire
- Ceremonial county: Lincolnshire
- Region: Yorkshire and the Humber
- Country: England
- Sovereign state: United Kingdom
- Post town: Barrow-upon-Humber
- Postcode district: DN19
- Police: Humberside
- Fire: Humberside
- Ambulance: East Midlands

Goxhill is a village and civil parish in North Lincolnshire, England. The population of the civil parish taken at the 2011 census was 2,290. It is situated 5 miles (8 km) east from Barton-upon-Humber and 10 miles (16 km) north-west from Immingham.

Goxhill was part of the former Glanford district, part of the county of Humberside, between 1974 and 1996.

The village is served by Goxhill railway station, which runs from the town of Barton to the seaside resort of Cleethorpes. The area has been an important centre for clay pantile production since the 18th century and the industry is still represented in the village.

RAF Goxhill was used in the Second World War by RAF and the USAAF. The 78th Fighter Group arrived at the station, known officially as 8th Air Force Station No. F-345 on 1 December 1942. The American Units referred to it unofficially as "RAF Goat Hill". In 1943 Robert S. Johnson, a US ace pilot of the Second World War, was stationed here.

== Goxhill Hall ==
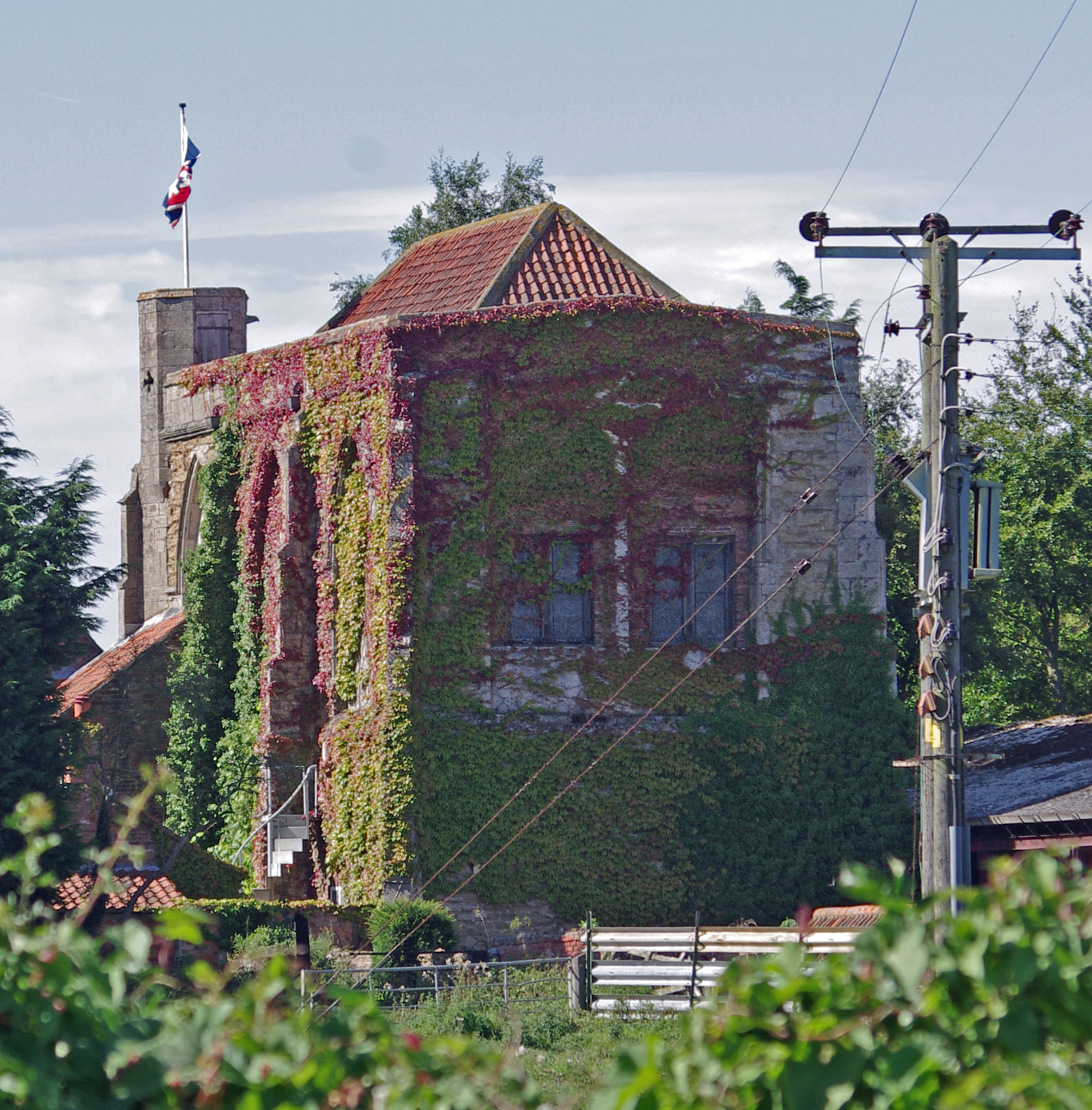
The mediaeval hall

Goxhill Hall is a Grade II* listed 18th-century house which stands adjacent to a Grade I listed mediaeval hall known as the Priory. The hall was built between 1690 and 1705 for Henry Hildyard and has been recently renovated. It is constructed in two storeys of red brick with blue brick dressing with a pantile roof and a 5-bay frontage.

The mediaeval hall, originally part of a larger complex, dates from the late 14th and early 15th century and is built in two storeys of limestone rubble with ashlar dressings and a late 18th-century pantile roof. It has an undercroft and a single room 1st-floor hall.

The present architect owners of the properties are carrying out a programme of renovation, including excavation of the moat.

== See also ==
- Humber Gas Tunnel
- P-38 Lightning
