= Barrow Hall, Lincolnshire =

Building in Barrow upon Humber, Lincolnshire, England

Coordinates: 53.6706°N 0.3875°W

Barrow Hall is an 18th-century residential building and a Grade I listed building in Barrow-upon-Humber, North Lincolnshire, England.

== History ==
The Hall was built in 1789 for George Uppleby, a barrister. The original building was built in red bricks in Flemish bond with a Welsh slate roof. The site is currently used as a care home.
