= Redbourne =

Village and civil parish in the North Lincolnshire district of Lincolnshire, England

Coordinates: 53.488666°N 0.535293°W

- Location within Lincolnshire
- Population: 400 (2011)
- OS grid reference: SE972001
  - London: 140 mi (230 km) S
- Unitary authority: North Lincolnshire
- Ceremonial county: Lincolnshire
- Region: Yorkshire and the Humber
- Country: England
- Sovereign state: United Kingdom
- Post town: Gainsborough
- Postcode district: DN21
- Police: Humberside
- Fire: Humberside
- Ambulance: East Midlands
- UK Parliament: Scunthorpe

Redbourne is a village and civil parish in the North Lincolnshire district of Lincolnshire, England. The village is situated near the A15 road, and 5 miles (8 km) south from Brigg. According to the 2001 Census Redbourne had a population of 386, rising slightly to 400 at the 2011 census.

== History ==
The name Redbourne is derived from the Old English Name "Hredburna" meaning "reedy burn", a reference to a stream running through the village.

Redbourne church

The parish church of St Andrew was made redundant from the Church of England in 1978 and is now maintained by The Churches Conservation Trust. It is a Grade I listed building. Although the church has 14th- and 15th-century origins, the bulk of the existing building is 18th-century and represents a Georgian Gothic style, using a mixture of squared and coursed rubble limestone with ashlar dressings. Its square tower is approximately 90 feet (27 m) high. The alterations of 1772–4 in the gothic style were by the Lincoln architects Thomas and Henry Lumby and the chapel on the south side of the chancel served as a mausoleum for the family of the Dukes of St Albans.

== Geography ==
The Red Lion Hotel coaching inn on the village green dates from the 17th century.

A conservation area was designated in August 1985 by the old Humberside County Council and covers the historic village core but excludes the more recent residential developments on the periphery.

Construction of the Brigg and Redbourne bypass started on Monday 31 October 1988, which cost £5.5m. It would take 21 months, being built by Alfred McAlpine. It was opened by Humberside County Council chairman David Spooner on Wednesday 20 December 1989, being six months early.

Redbourne village

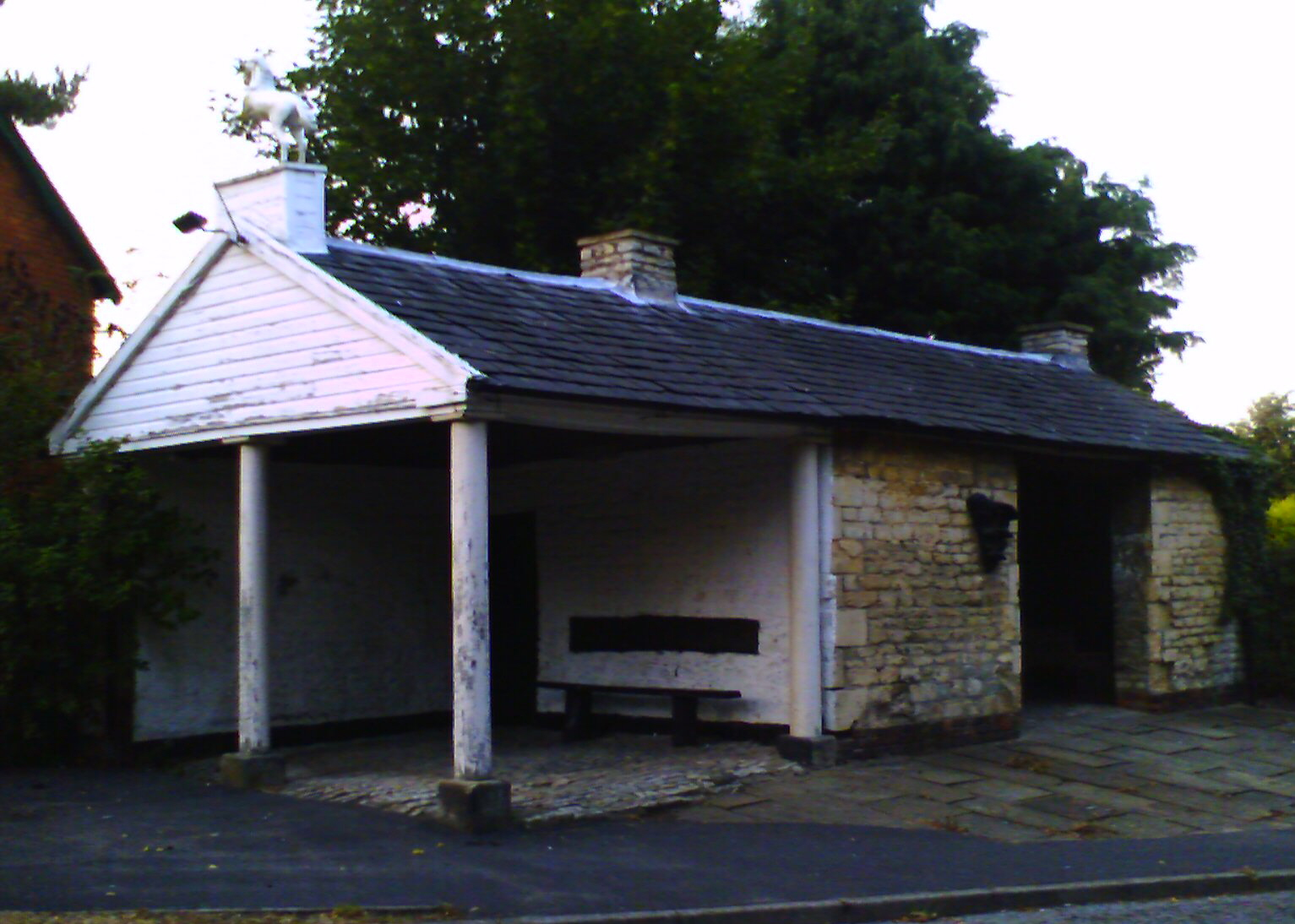
Old Smithy, Redbourne

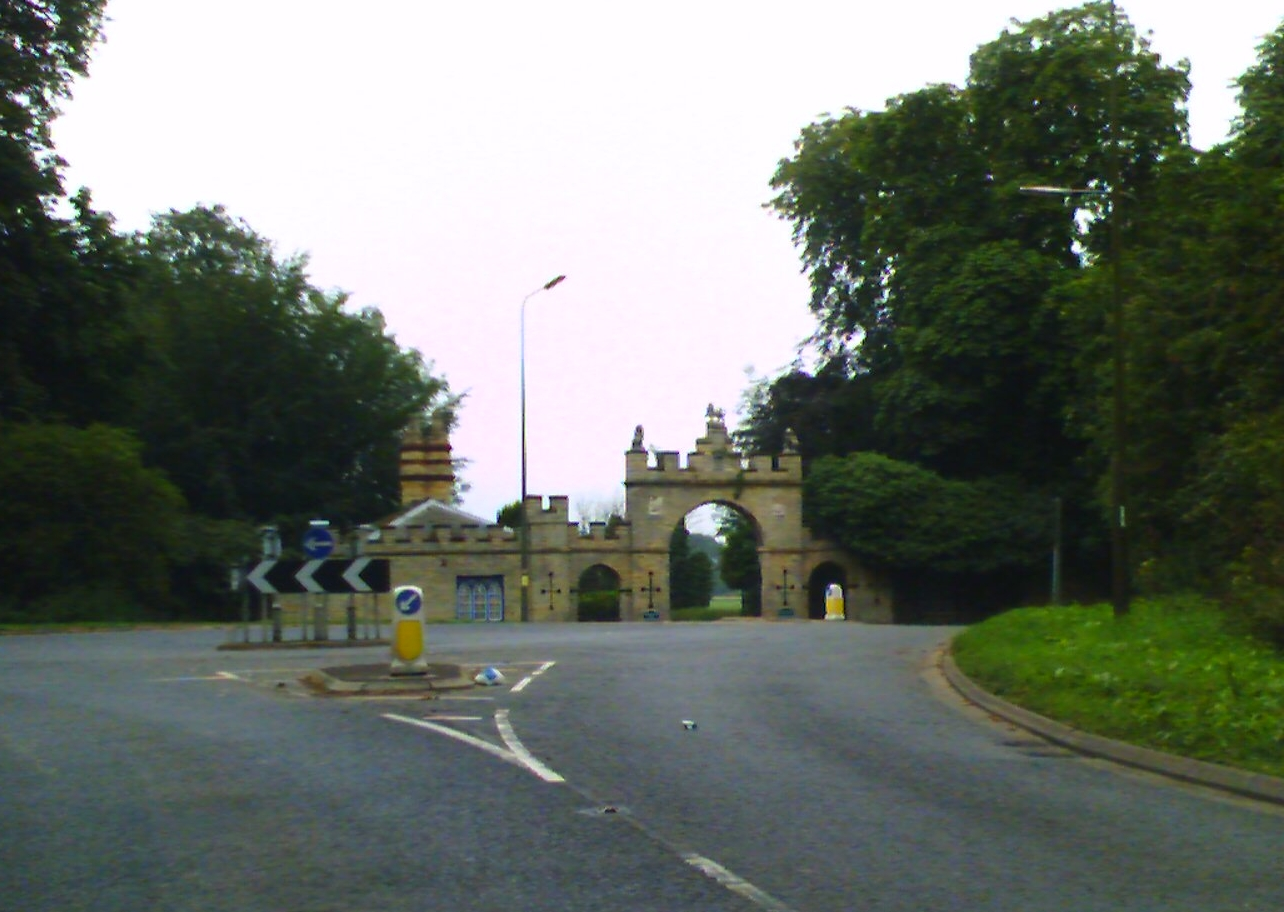
Redbourne Hall

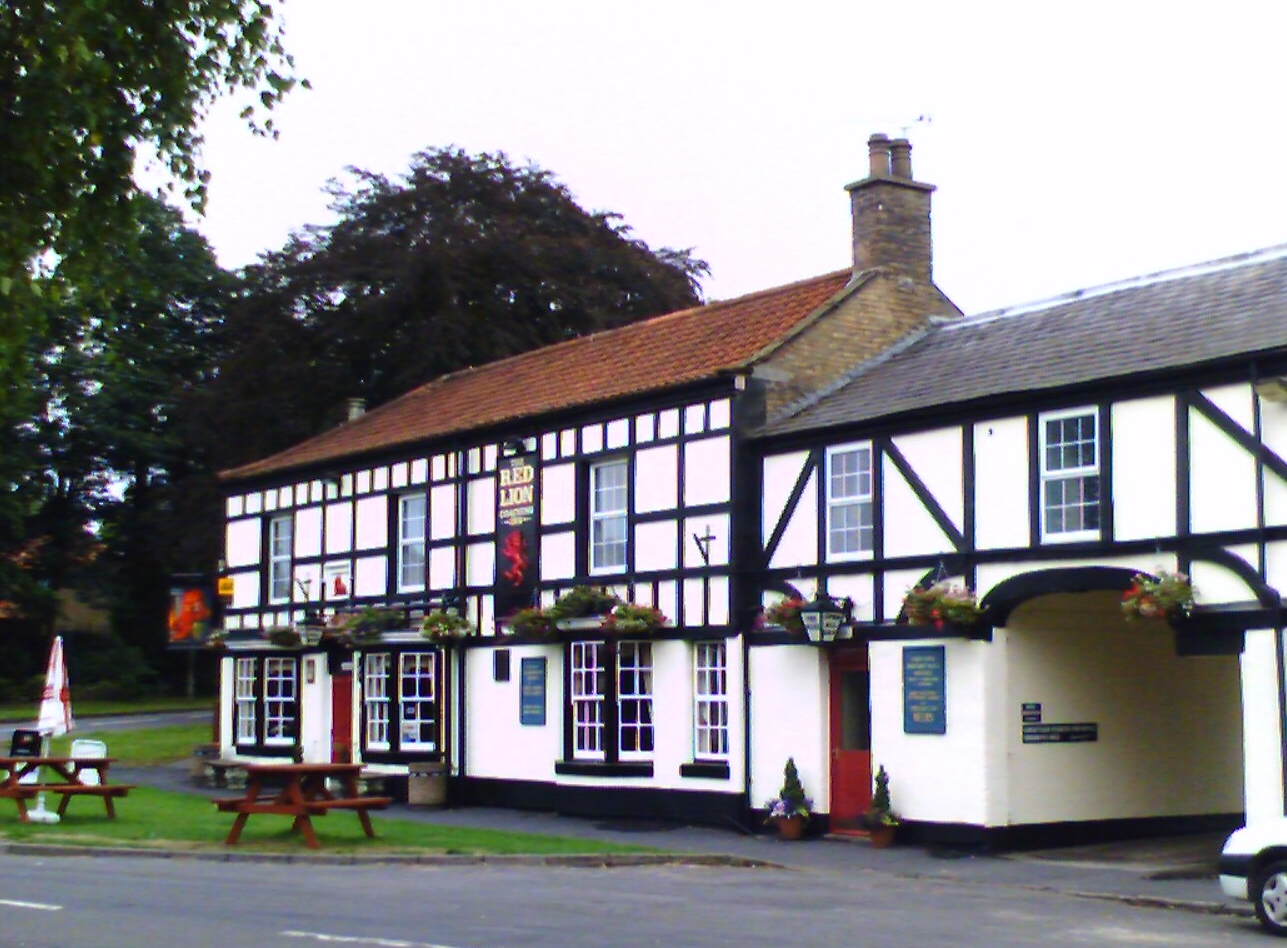
The Red Lion Hotel

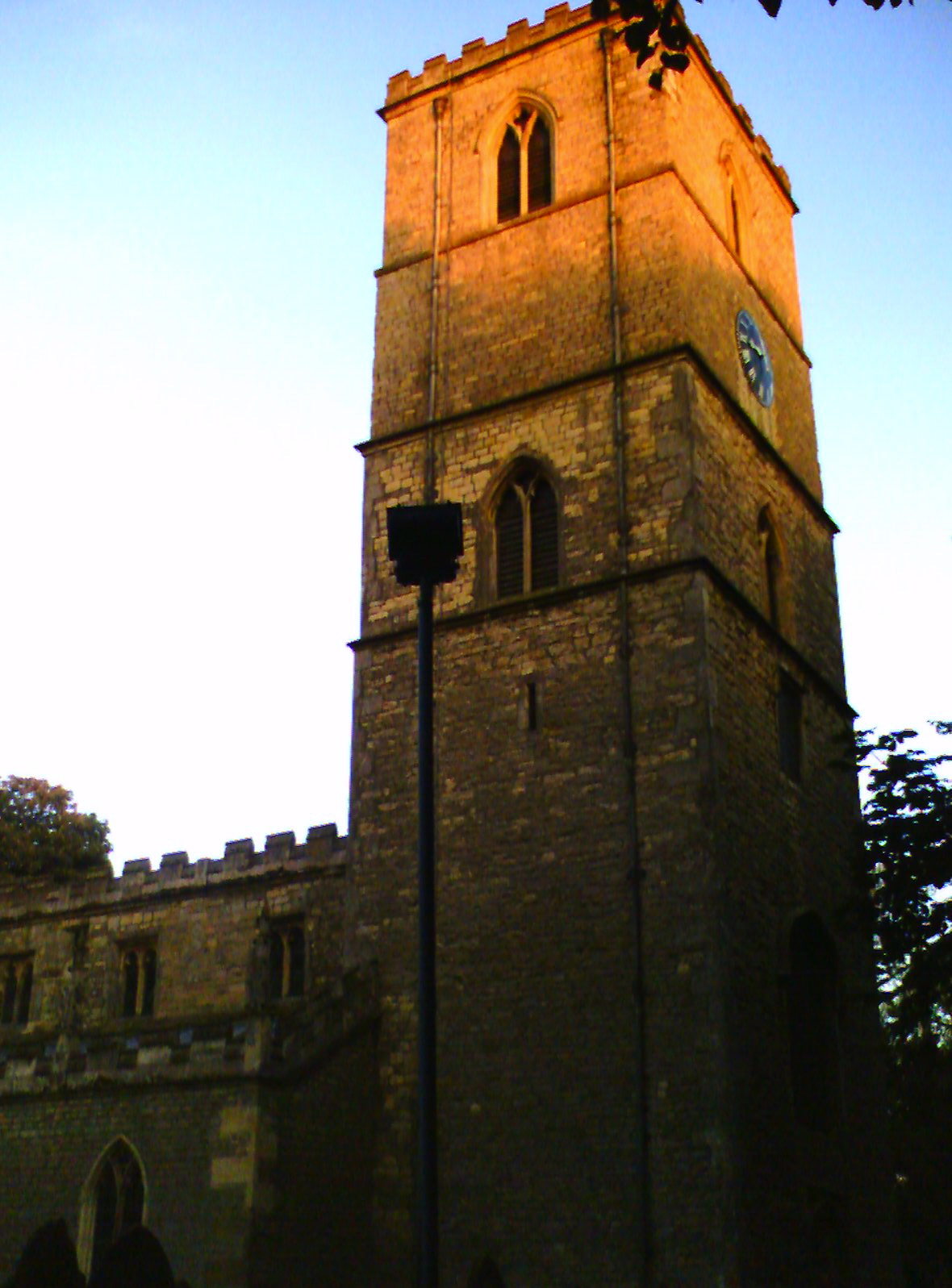
St Andrew's Church, Redbourne
