= Scunthorpe railway station =

Railway station in North Lincolnshire, England

Scunthorpe
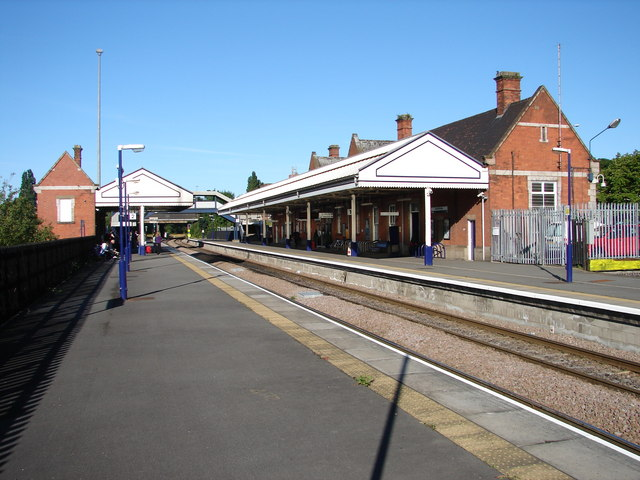
- Scunthorpe railway station in July 2007

General information
- Location: Scunthorpe, North Lincolnshire; England
- Coordinates: 53.58618°N 0.65100°W
- Grid reference: SE893108
- Manager: TransPennine Express
- Platforms: 2

Other information
- Station code: SCU
- Classification: DfT category D

Key dates
- 11 March 1928: Opened as Scunthorpe & Frodingham
- 16 November 1963: Renamed Scunthorpe

Passengers
- 2020/21: ▼90,570
- 2021/22: ▲279,906
- 2022/23: ▼253,186
- 2023/24: ▲325,412
- 2024/25: ▲379,072
Location
Notes
- Passenger statistics from the Office of Rail and Road

Scunthorpe railway station serves the town of Scunthorpe in North Lincolnshire, England. The station is located a short walk from the town centre, on Station Road.

As one approaches the station by road, there is a pay-and-display car park with approximately 50 spaces, including two designated disabled spaces. From the car park, it is a short walk to the Ticket Office.

The station has two platforms. Platform 1 serves mainly eastbound trains toward Grimsby/Cleethorpes, though some Northern Trains local services toward Doncaster use this platform through the day, as it is signalled for use in both directions. All westbound TransPennine Express (TPE) services, and most Northern services use Platform 2. This platform is accessible via a footbridge over the tracks. Lifts became available at this station in spring 2019 for wheelchair users and mobility-impaired passengers.

The station has limited seating on both platforms and three waiting rooms. There are toilets available on Platform 1.

This is not the original Scunthorpe station. The original station was known as Frodingham and located over half a mile to the east near the Brigg Road bridge (then a level crossing). It opened in 1864; it was replaced by a second station just 200 yd west of the first in 1887. This one was closed when the present station was opened on 11 March 1928. For over 40 years, the original station was known as "Scunthorpe & Frodingham".

From 1906, the town had another station serving the North Lindsey Light Railway, a line which ran from Dawes Lane, about half a mile to the east, to (originally) West Halton.

== Layout ==
Side platform
⇒	Platform 1	TP towards Cleethorpes
⇐	Platform 2	TP/Northern towards Liverpool Lime Street
Side platform
	Siding	towards Scunthorpe Steel Works	⇒
	Siding	towards Scunthorpe Steel Works	⇒

== Services ==
Services at Scunthorpe are operated by Northern Trains and TransPennine Express.

The typical off-peak service in trains per hour is:

- 1 tph to Liverpool Lime Street via Sheffield (semi-fast)
- 1 tp2h to Doncaster (all stations)
- 1 tph to Cleethorpes (semi-fast)

On Sundays, the stopping service to Doncaster does not operate. The service between Cleethorpes and Liverpool runs hourly from mid-morning.

A programme of major engineering work on the route between Thorne Junction and Scunthorpe in the summer of 2009 closed the line for 10 weeks to allow embankment reconstruction work to take place.

In February 2013 the line northeast of Hatfield and Stainforth station towards Thorne was blocked by the Hatfield Colliery landslip, with all services over the section halted. The line reopened in July 2013. During the closure a modified timetable was in operation with Cleethorpes trains starting/terminating here.

Preceding station	National Rail	Following station
Doncaster	TransPennine Express: South Humberside Main Line; (South TransPennine)	Barnetby
Althorpe Limited Service	TransPennine Express: South Humberside Main Line; (South TransPennine)	Barnetby
Althorpe	Northern Trains South Humberside Main Line Monday-Saturday only	Terminus
	Disused railways	
Gunhouse Wharf	Trent, Ancholme and Grimsby Railway	Appleby
Gunness and Burringham	Trent, Ancholme and Grimsby Railway	Appleby
