= Winteringham railway station =

Former railway station in England

Winteringham

General information
- Location: Winteringham, North Lincolnshire; England
- Coordinates: 53.69059°N 0.58852°W
- Grid reference: SE933225
- Platforms: 2

Other information
- Status: Disused

History
- Original company: North Lindsey Light Railway
- Pre-grouping: Great Central Railway
- Post-grouping: London and North Eastern Railway

Key dates
- 15 July 1907: Station opened
- 13 July 1925: Station closed
Location

Winteringham railway station was built by the North Lindsey Light Railway in Winteringham, Lincolnshire, England and opened for public service on 15 July 1907 although the first train, a village sports club special, had run two days previously.

Just north of the station the line divided in two; the "main line" ran to Whitton, and a "branch line" to a wharf at Winteringham Haven on the Humber where the company had installed two shutes for handling coal and slag. A weekly ferry service operated from the Haven to Hull, outward on Monday and returning on Wednesday.

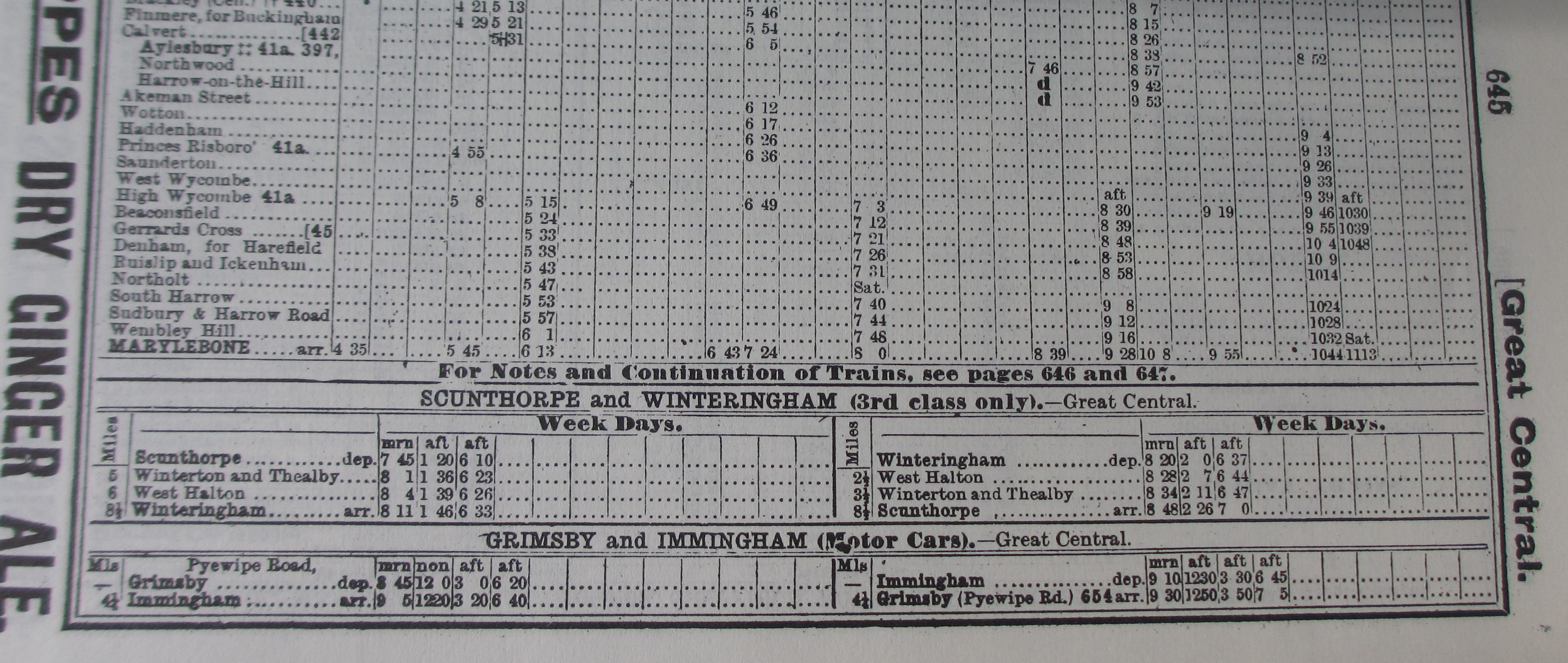
Part of Page 645 of April 1910 British public railway timetable, aka Bradshaw's Guide

The station closed to passengers on Monday 13 July 1925, though in all probability the last train ran on Saturday 11 July. It remained open for goods traffic until 1 October 1951, with local farmers objecting strongly to its closure, citing particularly the station's use for onward transportation of their sugar beet to the Brigg sugar factory.

Preceding station	Disused railways	Following station
West Halton	North Lindsey Light Railway	Whitton
West Halton	North Lindsey Light Railway	Winteringham Haven
