= West Halton railway station =

Former railway station in England

West Halton
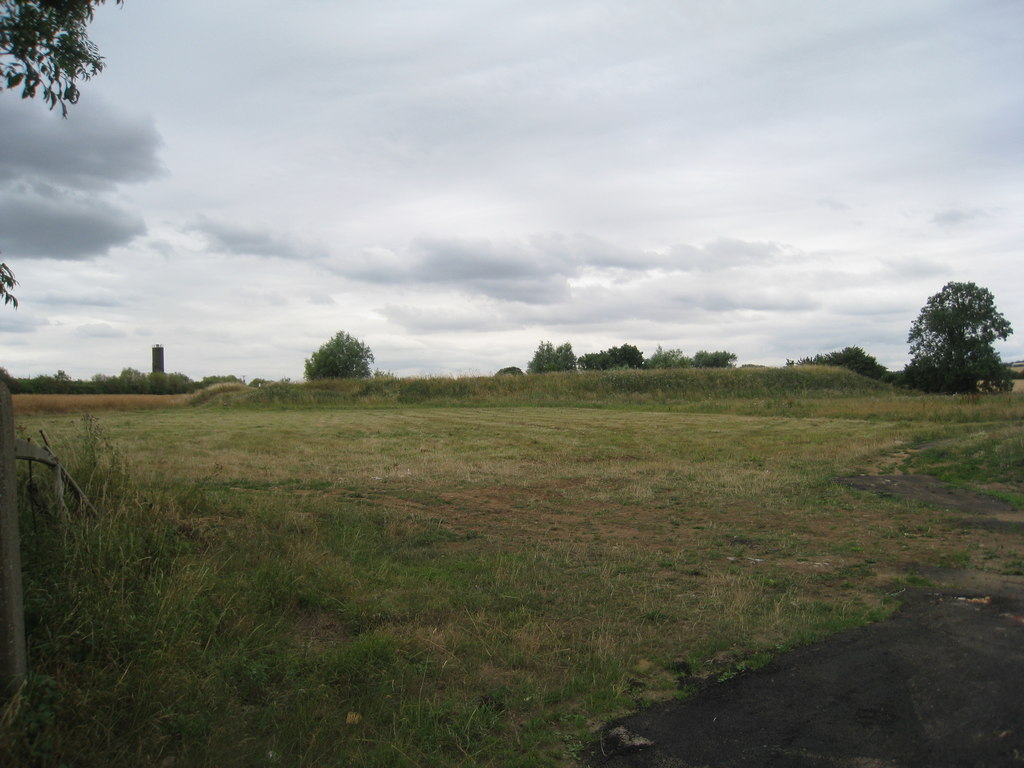

General information
- Location: West Halton, North Lincolnshire; England
- Coordinates: 53.6706°N 0.6216°W
- Grid reference: SE911202

Other information
- Status: Disused

History
- Original company: North Lindsey Light Railway
- Pre-grouping: Great Central Railway
- Post-grouping: London and North Eastern Railway

Key dates
- 3 September 1906: Station opened as terminus
- 15 July 1907: Line extended
- 13 July 1925: Station closed
Location

West Halton railway station was a station in West Halton, Lincolnshire. The station was built by the North Lindsey Light Railway on its line from Scunthorpe (Dawes Lane) railway station to Whitton in north Lincolnshire. The station was opened with the first section of the line (between Scunthorpe, where there was a junction with the Great Central Railway, and West Halton) on 3 September 1906; the line was extended from West Halton to Winteringham Haven on 15 July 1907. Following this extension, the passenger service along the line consisted of three trains each way between Scunthorpe (Dawes Lane) and Winteringham, which called at Winterton and Thealby and West Halton. The station closed on 13 July 1925.

Preceding station	Disused railways	Following station
Winterton	North Lindsey Light Railway	Winteringham

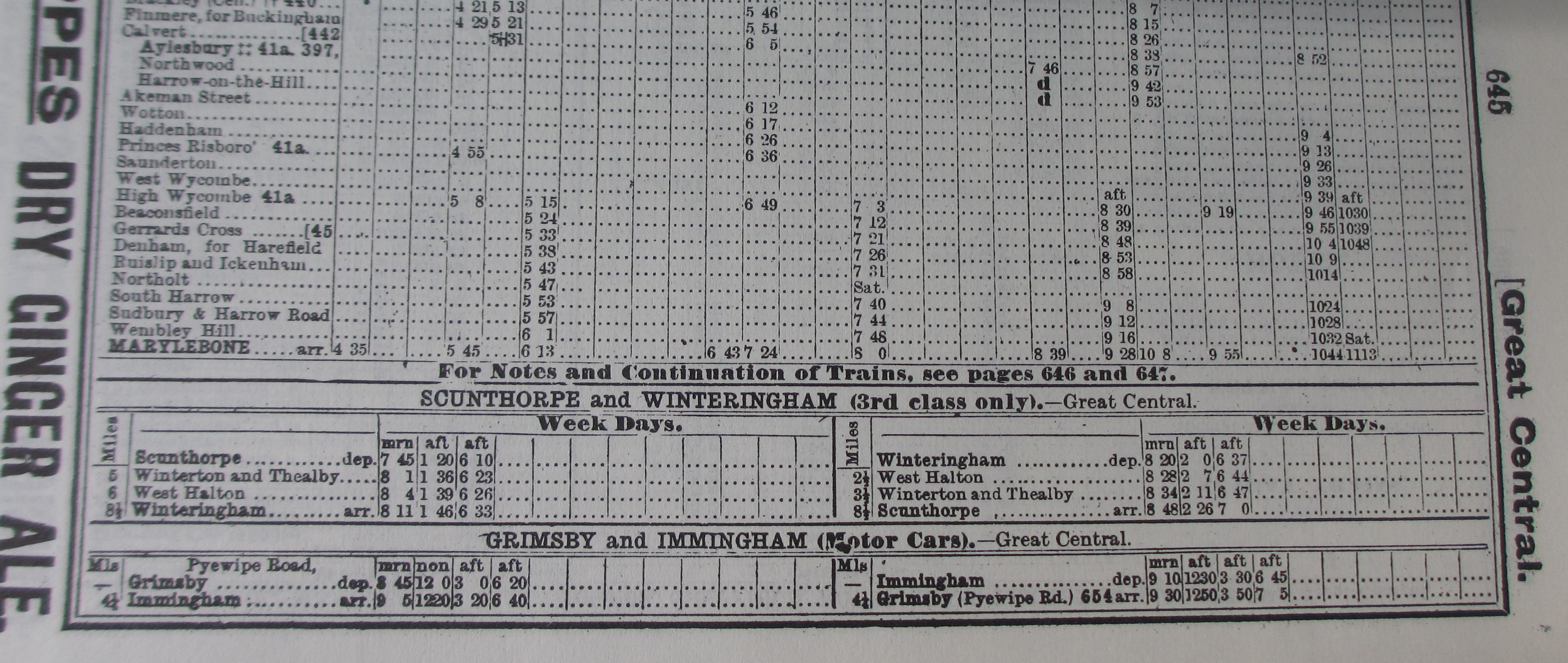
Part of Page 645 of April 1910 British public railway timetable, aka Bradshaw's Guide
