= Whitton railway station (Lincolnshire) =

Former railway station in England

Coordinates: 53.7099°N 0.6365°W

Whitton railway station was a railway station, built by the North Lindsey Light Railway in Whitton, Lincolnshire. It was the northern terminus of the line from Scunthorpe (Dawes Lane) railway station. It opened in 1907 and closed for passengers in 1925 and goods in 1951.

The railway company built a pier on the Humber estuary which gave the Gainsborough–Hull packet steamer an additional calling point, utilised three times weekly.

| Preceding station | Disused railways | Following station |
|---|---|---|
| Winteringham; Line and station closed | Great Central Railway; North Lindsey Light Railway | Terminus |
