= Frodingham =

Frodingham may refer to:

- Appleby Frodingham F.C., football club based in Scunthorpe, Lincolnshire, England
- Appleby Frodingham Railway Preservation Society, based at Scunthorpe in Lincolnshire
- Appleby-Frodingham Steel Company, formed in 1912 by a take over of the Appleby Ironworks by the Frodingham Ironworks
- Frodingham, Lincolnshire, a former hamlet, area of Scunthorpe
- Frodingham railway station, railway station in Scunthorpe, Lincolnshire
- North Frodingham, village and civil parish in the East Riding of Yorkshire, England
- North Frodingham railway station, was to have been a station on the proposed North Holderness Light Railway
