= West Halton =

Village and civil parish in North Lincolnshire, England

Coordinates: 53.677777°N 0.631234°W

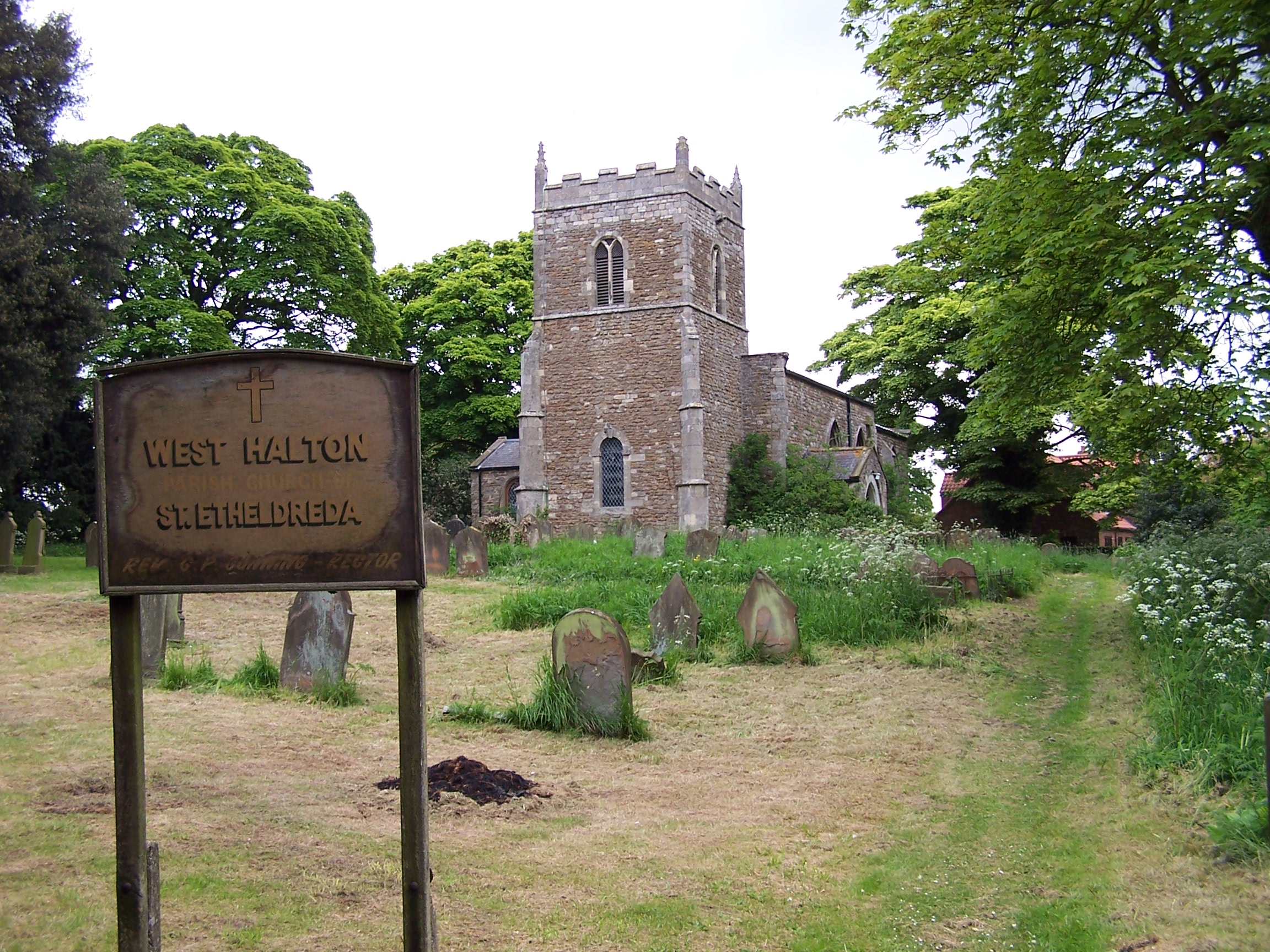
- The parish church of St Etheldreda, West Halton

- Location within Lincolnshire
- Population: 340 (2011 Census)
- OS grid reference: SE905210
  - London: 155 mi (249 km) S
- Civil parish: West Halton and Coleby
- Unitary authority: North Lincolnshire
- Ceremonial county: Lincolnshire
- Region: Yorkshire and the Humber
- Country: England
- Sovereign state: United Kingdom
- Post town: SCUNTHORPE
- Postcode district: DN15
- Dialling code: 01724
- Police: Humberside
- Fire: Humberside
- Ambulance: East Midlands

West Halton is a village and civil parish in North Lincolnshire, England. It is situated 2.5 miles (4 km) north-west from Winterton, approximately 7 miles (11 km) north from Scunthorpe, and 2 miles (3 km) south from the Humber Estuary. The parish contains part of Coleby, a hamlet south of the village.

In the 2001 Census the parish had a population of 331, increasing slightly to 340 at the 2011 census.

The settlement at West Halton has existed since at least the Anglo Saxon period when it was traditionally thought to have been founded as a monastery or minster by St Æthelthryth. Excavations by the University of Sheffield confirmed the presence of a 7th-century settlement. West Halton is listed in the 1086 Domesday Book as "Haltone". The name has been translated as "farmstead in a nook or corner of land".

West Halton has a central village green. There is a public house, the Butchers Arms, and a village hall which has served as a part-time post office since the village post office closed. There are no shops in the village. The church is dedicated to St Etheldreda; it was built in 1695 as a replacement for an earlier building destroyed by fire in 1692.

A public transport bus service is provided by Hornsby Travel, subsidised by North Lincolnshire Council. The now closed West Halton railway station was situated near the village. It was built in 1906 by the North Lindsey Light Railway.

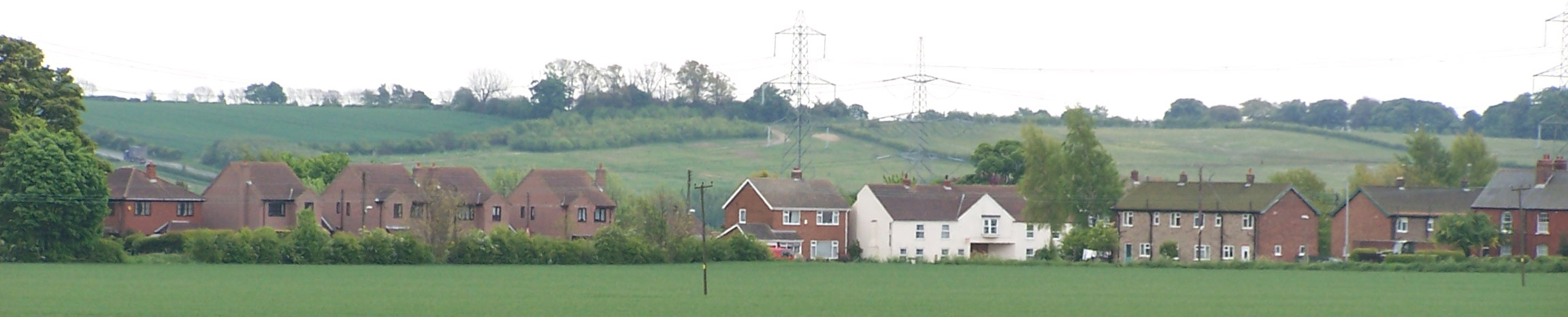
West Halton, North Lincolnshire
