= Listed buildings in Broomfleet =

Broomfleet is a civil parish in the county of the East Riding of Yorkshire, England. It contains three listed buildings that are recorded in the National Heritage List for England. All the listed buildings are designated at Grade II, the lowest of the three grades, which is applied to "buildings of national importance and special interest". The parish contains the village of Broomfleet and the surrounding countryside. The listed buildings consist of a church, its former vicarage, and a canal lock.

== Buildings ==
Name and location	Photograph	Date	Notes
Weighton Lock; 53.71986°N 0.67644°W		1773	The lock and sluice control the entrance of the Market Weighton Canal into the Humber. The lock is about 3 metres (9.8 ft) in width and about 30 metres (98 ft) in length, with two pairs of gates. The sluice is to the west, and to the east is a humpbacked bridge.
St Mary's Church; 53.73403°N 0.66503°W		1860–61	The church, designed by John L. Pearson, is in limestone with a Welsh slate roof. It consists of a nave, a chancel, and a north tower containing a porch with a pointed doorway. The bell openings have two lights, above these are blind quatrefoils, and a pyramidal roof. Most of the windows are lancets.
Broomfleet Grange; 53.73419°N 0.66453°W		1861	A vicarage, later a private house, it was designed by John L. Pearson. It is in yellow brick with detailing in grey brick, and has a Welsh slate roof with a half-hipped gable, and decorative ridge tiles. There are two storeys and an L-shaped plan, with a main range of four bays, and a single-bay cross-wing. On the main range is a projecting porch, and on the cross-wing is a doorway with a pointed head. The windows are casements, and there is a two-light transomed stair window.
