= Winterton Roman villa =

Coordinates: 53.650513°N 0.62532485°W

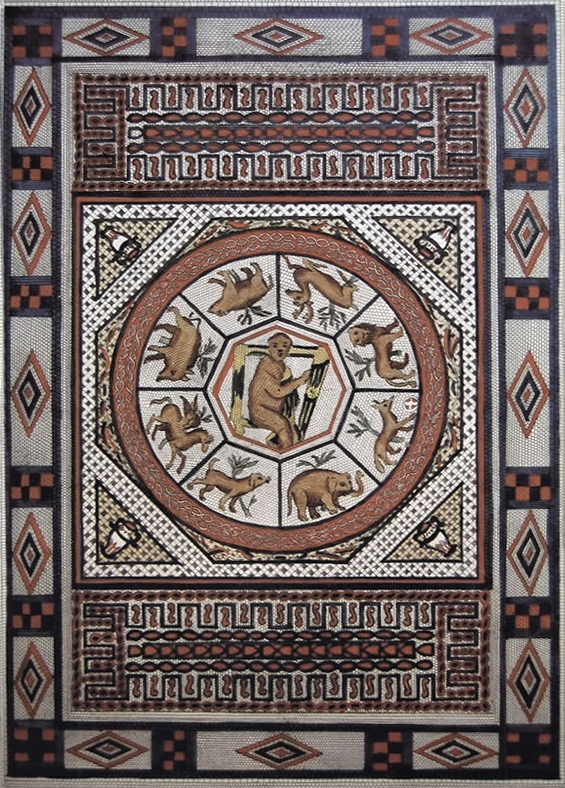
- The Orpheus mosaic from Winterton villa

- Location within Lincolnshire

General information
- Architectural style: Romano-British Villa
- Location: Winterton, North Lincolnshire grid reference SE98491914, United Kingdom
- Construction started: c.2nd century

Winterton Roman villa is a Roman villa in Winterton, North Lincolnshire. It was discovered in 1747.

== Villa ==
The villa was built in the 2nd century AD and reconstructed in the 4th century. It was partially excavated several times. Between 1958 and 1967 Ian Stead led a series of excavations at the site culminating in the 1976 volume Excavations at Winterton Roman Villa and Other Roman Sites in North Lincolnshire. Following these excavations Winterton was one of the most (archaeologically) completely known villa sites in England.

The villa comprises several buildings surrounding a courtyard measuring 300 feet (91 m) in width, including domestic spaces, agricultural buildings, and three bath-houses. Five large mosaics have been found at the site. The Orpheus mosaic is one of thirteen examples of this subject from Roman Britain and is one of the two most northerly examples; the other being at the nearby Horkstow Roman villa. A mosaic depicting Fortuna is in the North Lincolnshire Museum along with a collection of pottery, coins, and glass.

== See also ==
- Winterton Lady
