= Whitton Island =

Island in the Humber Estuary, England

Coordinates: 53.714°N 0.670°W

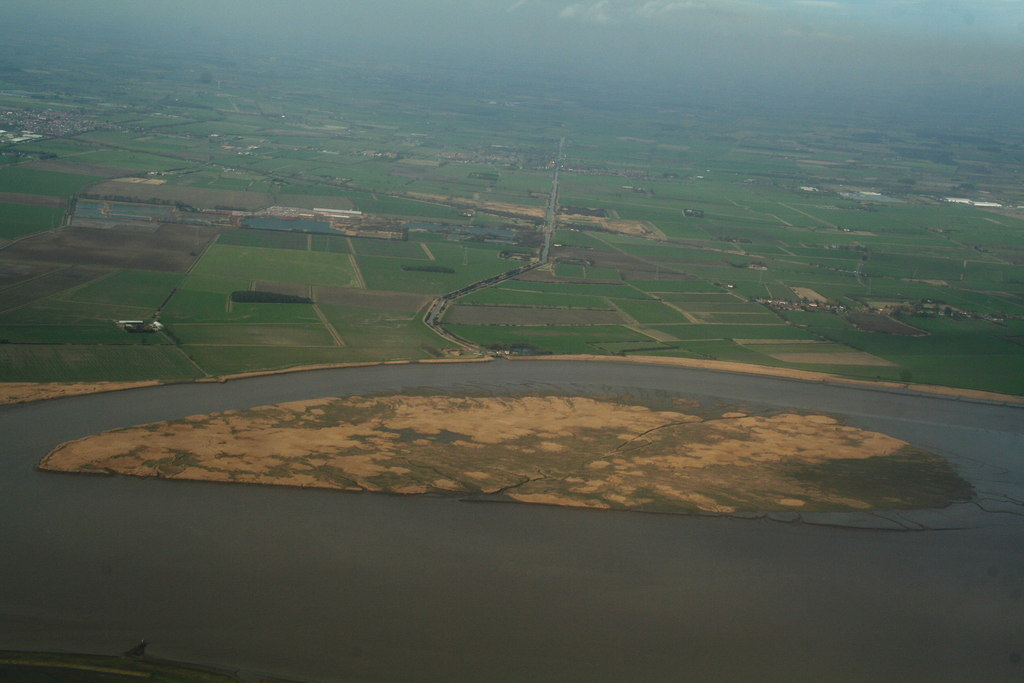
- Aerial view of Whitton Island
- Interactive map of Whitton Island

Geography
- Area: 1.2 km^{2} (0.46 sq mi)

Administration
- England
- County: East Riding of Yorkshire; Lincolnshire
- Civil Parishes: Broomfleet, Blacktoft, Alkborough, Whitton

Demographics
- Population: 0 (2014)

Whitton Island
- Location within the East Riding of Yorkshire
- OS grid reference: SE878250
- Shire county: East Riding of Yorkshire
- Region: Yorkshire and the Humber
- Country: England
- Sovereign state: United Kingdom
- Police: Humberside
- Fire: Humberside
- Ambulance: Yorkshire

Whitton Island is an island situated at the western end of the Humber Estuary in northern England.

The almond-shaped island straddles the county boundary between the counties of East Riding of Yorkshire to the north and North Lincolnshire which otherwise runs over tidal water roughly along the centre line of the estuary. Parts of the island fall within the boundaries of four civil parishes. Despite being named after the Lincolnshire parish of Whitton, the largest part of the island is in the Yorkshire parish of Blacktoft and much of the remainder is in the neighbouring parish of Broomfleet. Much smaller parts of the southeast coast of the island fall within the Lincolnshire parishes of Alkborough and Whitton.

Whitton Island is an ait (or eyot), formed by the deposit of sands and gravels washed down by the river, which accumulate over a period of time, and become consolidated by the vegetation that colonises them. Only in recent years has the island emerged sufficiently from the mud and sand bank known as Whitton Sand to be mapped by the Ordnance Survey as a new feature.

== Nature conservation ==
Whitton Sand forms a part of the Humber Wildfowl Refuge.

Whitton Island is owned by Associated British Ports, who began discussion with the RSPB during 2014 over its future management. In March 2017 the RSPB signed a 50-year lease on the then 120 hectare island to manage it as a Nature Reserve. To improve the island as a habitat for wetland birds, the RSPB dug a lagoon and several ponds. This has resulted in the arrival of increased numbers of birds, some of which had not previously ventured so high up the estuary. The island now provides a safe nesting habitat for the avocet, and also good feeding and roosting areas for pink-footed geese, teal, wigeon, dunlin, spoonbills, curlew, turnstone and ringed plover. The reserve is not open to the public because of its Wildfowl Refuge status.
