= Coleby, North Lincolnshire =

Hamlet in the civil parish of West Halton in North Lincolnshire, England

Coordinates: 53.666°N 0.640°W

Coleby
- Location within Lincolnshire
- Population: 331 (2001 census)
- OS grid reference: SE898197
  - London: 150 mi (240 km) S
- Civil parish: West Halton
- Unitary authority: North Lincolnshire
- Ceremonial county: Lincolnshire
- Region: Yorkshire and the Humber
- Country: England
- Sovereign state: United Kingdom
- Post town: SCUNTHORPE
- Postcode district: DN15
- Dialling code: 01724
- Police: Humberside
- Fire: Humberside
- Ambulance: East Midlands

Coleby is a hamlet in the civil parish of West Halton in North Lincolnshire, England. It is situated approximately 7 miles (11 km) north from Scunthorpe, and 3 miles (5 km) south from the Humber estuary.

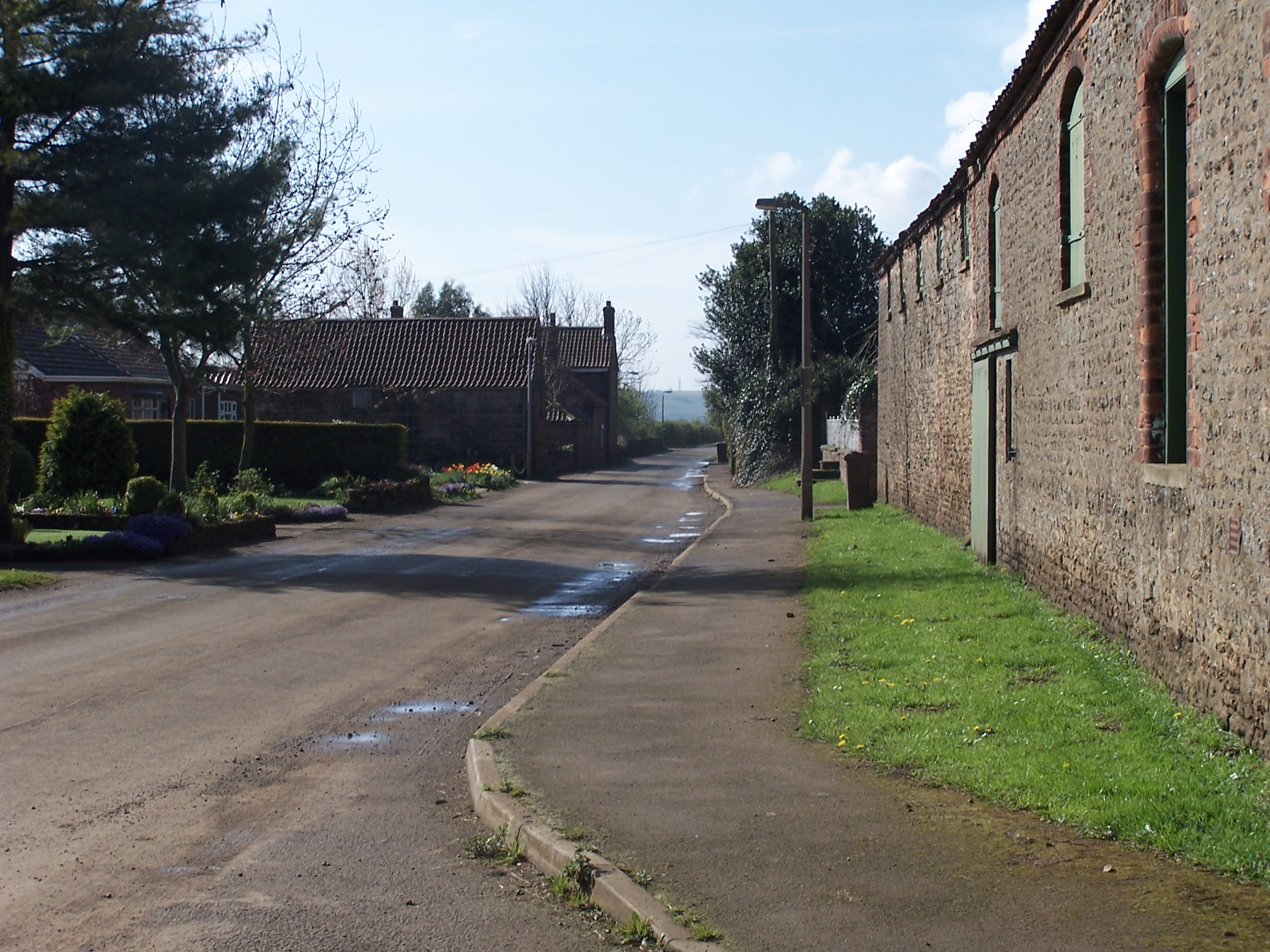
A view of Coleby from the bus shelter.

Coleby pre-dates the Norman Conquest, its name derived from Old Norse meaning the "farmstead of a man named Koli". It was described in the Domesday Book.

Coleby has 28 dwellings including 3 farms: Eastdale Farm, Hall Farm and Manor Farm. The village has allotments, but no shops or public houses, and its telephone box was removed in 2008. Public Transport is provided by Stagecoach Lincolnshire and subsidised by North Lincolnshire Council.

Internet is delivered by ADSL through underground, waxed-paper insulated copper wires that were laid by the GPO in 1955. FTTC is not yet available because the cabinet is too far away. As of July 2018, FTTP/Ultrafast broadband is now available in the village with a speed guarantee of at least 100Mb with ULTRAFAST FIBRE 2 PLUS Average speed 300Mb from BT.
