= Frodingham, Lincolnshire =

Former hamlet, now a suburb of Scunthorpe, Lincolnshire, England

Coordinates: 53.594500°N 0.6526°W

Frodingham
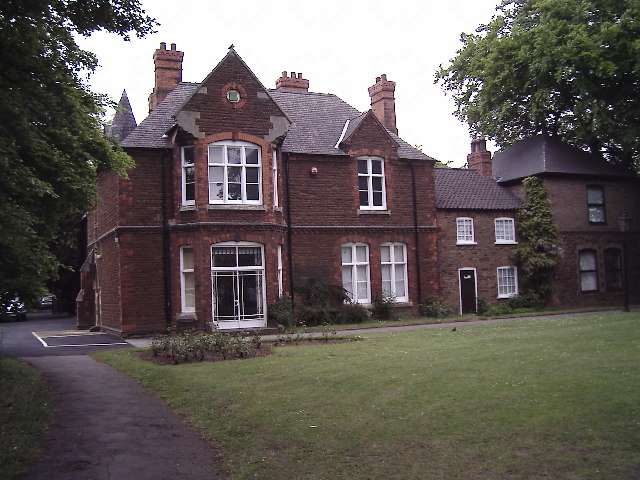
- North Lincolnshire Museum

- Location within Lincolnshire
- OS grid reference: SE892117
  - London: 145 mi (233 km) S
- Unitary authority: North Lincolnshire
- Ceremonial county: Lincolnshire
- Region: Yorkshire and the Humber
- Country: England
- Sovereign state: United Kingdom
- Post town: Scunthorpe
- Postcode district: DN15
- Police: Humberside
- Fire: Humberside
- Ambulance: East Midlands
- UK Parliament: Scunthorpe

Frodingham is a suburban area of Scunthorpe in the borough of North Lincolnshire, in Lincolnshire, England and the name of a ward for elections to North Lincolnshire Council. The original settlement of Frodingham lay directly to the south of Scunthorpe town centre, although the name Frodingham is now often used to refer to the area immediately to the north of the town centre along Frodingham Road.

== History ==
Frodingham parish originally included the townships of Frodingham, Scunthorpe, Brumby, Crosby (part) and Gunness (part). The townships became civil parishes in 1866. In 1894 Brumby & Frodingham Urban District Council (UDC) was formed, separate from neighbouring Scunthorpe UDC. In 1911 at the last national census before the parish was abolished, the civil parish had a population of 1,734. On 1 October 1919 the parish was abolished to form "Scunthorpe and Frodingham" and Brumby Rural. Brumby & Frodingham UDC was amalgamated with Scunthorpe in 1919.

Frodingham township and civil parish, sandwiched between Scunthorpe to the north and Brumby to the south, was 5 miles long and 1/4 mile wide. It ran from the Trent in the west, across the Lincoln Cliff, through the hamlet itself and across to Bottesford Beck in the east. It was here in the east end of the township that large deposits of ironstone began to be exploited in the mid 19th century: the Frodingham, North Lincolnshire and Redbourn Hill ironworks were established, and workers' cottages were built either side of Rowland Road, in an area then known as New Frodingham. In 1885 Kelly's Directory reported a large temperance hall, built in 1871, that also housed a library and newspaper reading room. Chief crops grown in the area were wheat, barley and potatoes.

In modern times, the name Frodingham is now used to refer to the area around Frodingham Road in Crosby, and some online maps reflect this usage.

The Trent, Ancholme and Grimsby Railway ran through the township, and the railway station was next to the Frodingham ironworks. The first Frodingham railway station was opened in 1866; the second station was opened in 1886, and closed in 1926.

In 1912, the Frodingham Ironworks was taken over by the Appleby Ironworks to form the Appleby-Frodingham Steel Company.

The North Lincolnshire Museum is in the former village vicarage, built in 1874 on the site of Frodingham Hall.

== Church of St Lawrence ==
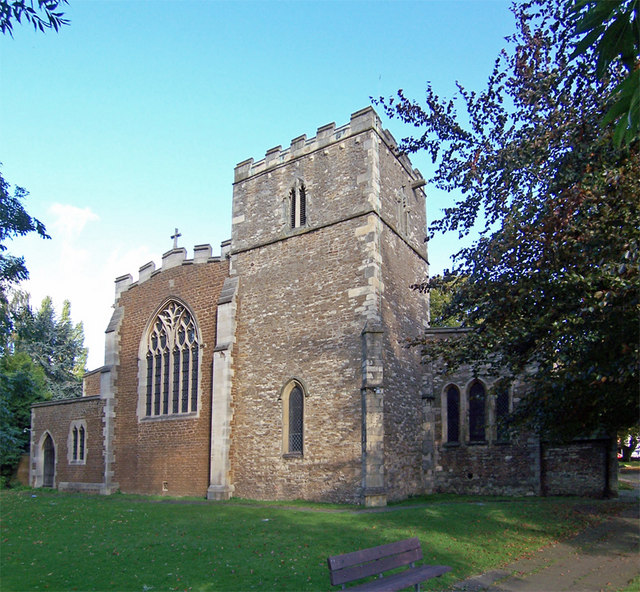
St Lawrence's Church

St Lawrence's church was the centre of the original hamlet of Frodingham. The church is a Grade I listed Anglican church dedicated to St Lawrence. Originating from the 12th century, it was rebuilt in 1841 except for the Early English-style tower. In 1916 Cox recorded a Carolean altar table, dated 1635. It contains memorials to the Healy family who added several windows within the church.

The vicar of Frodingham from 1655 to 1660 was John Ryther (c1638-1681). At the Restoration he was deprived of his living here and moved to Brough and was deprived again in 1662. After setting up Kipping Chapel near Bradford and some time in prison, he moved to London and began one of the first missions amongst seamen at Wapping in 1669. Due to his emotional preaching style, he was often known as 'Crying Jeremy.'

== See also ==
- Brumby Hall
