= Gunness and Burringham railway station =

Former railway station in Lincolnshire, England

Coordinates: 53.5858°N 0.7281°W

Gunness railway station, later suffixed "and Burringham", is a former railway station in Gunness, Lincolnshire. Today trains call at the nearby Althorpe.

The station was opened by the Trent, Ancholme and Grimsby Railway and was situated on a short branch from the main line.

Preceding station	Disused railways	Following station
Terminus	Trent, Ancholme & Grimsby	Frodingham; Line and station closed
