= Ian Stead =

British archaeologist

Ian Mathieson Stead FSA FBA (born 1936) is a British archaeologist and curator, specialising in the British Iron Age.

Stead was an Inspector of Ancient Monuments for the UK Government. Along with Geoffrey Wainwright and Brian Davison, Stead was part of the 'Government digging team' working under the Chief Inspector of Ancient Monuments. With the Inspectorate he undertook excavations at Winterton Roman villa, Baldock, and Verulamium amongst many others. He subsequently worked as the deputy keeper of the Department of Prehistoric and Romano-British Antiquities of the British Museum.

He was elected as a Fellow of the Society of Antiquaries of London (FSA) on 3 March 1966, and as a Fellow of the British Academy (FBA) in 1991. In 1995 he was presented with a festschrift by former colleagues at the British Museum titled Sites and Sights of the Iron Age: Essays on Fieldwork and Museum Research Presented to Ian Mathieson Stead.

== Select publications ==
- Stead, I. M. 1976. Excavations at Winterton Roman villa and other Roman sites in north Lincolnshire 1958-1967. London, HMSO.
- Stead, I. M. 1979. The Arras Culture, York, Yorkshire Philosophical Society.
- Stead, I.M. 1985. The Battersea Shield. London, British Museum.
- Stead, I. M. and Rigby, V. 1986. Baldock: the excavation of a Roman and pre-Roman settlement, 1968-72. Society for the Promotion of Roman Studies.
- Stead, I. M. 1989. Verulamium: the King Harry Lane site.
- Stead, I. M. 2000. The Salisbury hoard. Tempus.
