= Elsham railway station =

Former railway station in Lincolnshire, England

Coordinates: 53.5811°N 0.4620°W

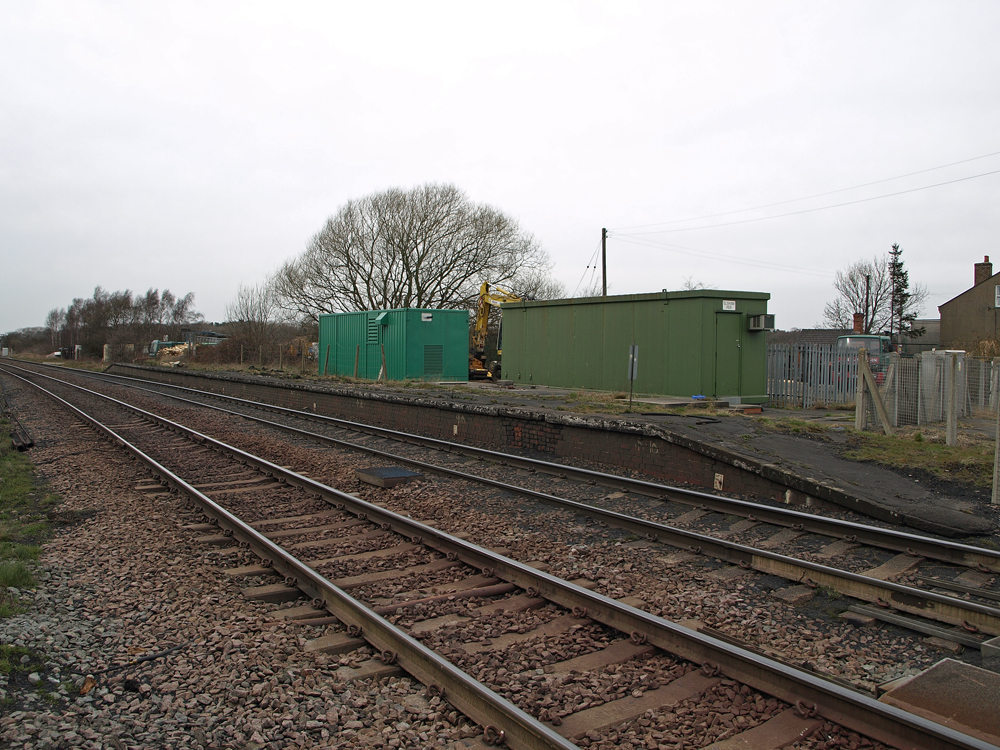
Derelict platform of Elsham railway station

Elsham railway station is a former railway station in Elsham, Lincolnshire, England. The station was opened by the Trent, Ancholme and Grimsby Railway on 1 October 1866 and like other T. A. & G. stations had staggered platforms. The station was the most easterly of the T. A. & G. stations the line, situated just a few miles from Wrawby Junction, Barnetby where it joined the M. S. & L. R. towards Grimsby. It was formally closed by British Rail on 3 October 1993.

Preceding station	Historical railways	Following station
Appleby; Line open, station closed	Great Central Railway; Trent, Ancholme & Grimsby	Barnetby; Line and station open

The final station master was Mr Robert Christopher Swinton, retired in 1966. Joint SM with Appleby Lincolnshire.
