= Winterton Lady =

Skeleton of a woman from Roman Lincolnshire

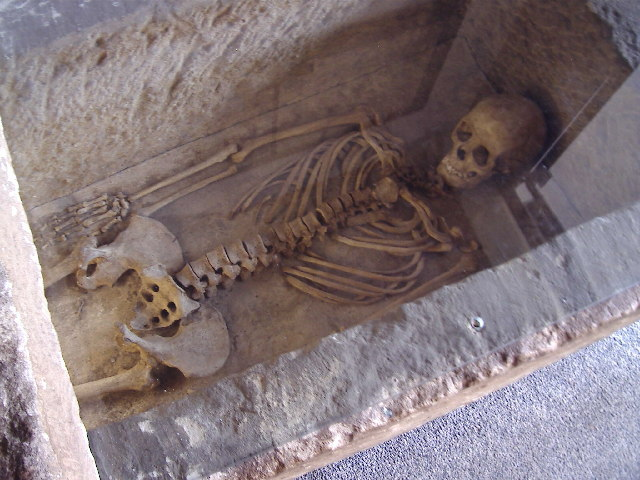
- The skeleton of the "Winterton Lady" on display in the North Lincolnshire Museum.
- Period/culture: Roman
- Discovered: 1968; Winterton, North Lincolnshire, England.
- Present location: North Lincolnshire Museum

The Winterton Lady is the skeleton of a Romano-British woman discovered in Winterton, North Lincolnshire, England. She was buried in a limestone sarcophagus, which was discovered during a road-widening scheme in 1968. She was aged between 20–25 years old when she died and originally stood at 5 feet 3 inches (1.60 m) tall.

Her skeleton and the sarcophagus, along with a model of her facial reconstruction, are on display in North Lincolnshire Museum.

== See also ==
- Winterton Roman villa
