= St Mary's Church, Broomfleet =

Church in Broomfleet, East Riding of Yorkshire, England

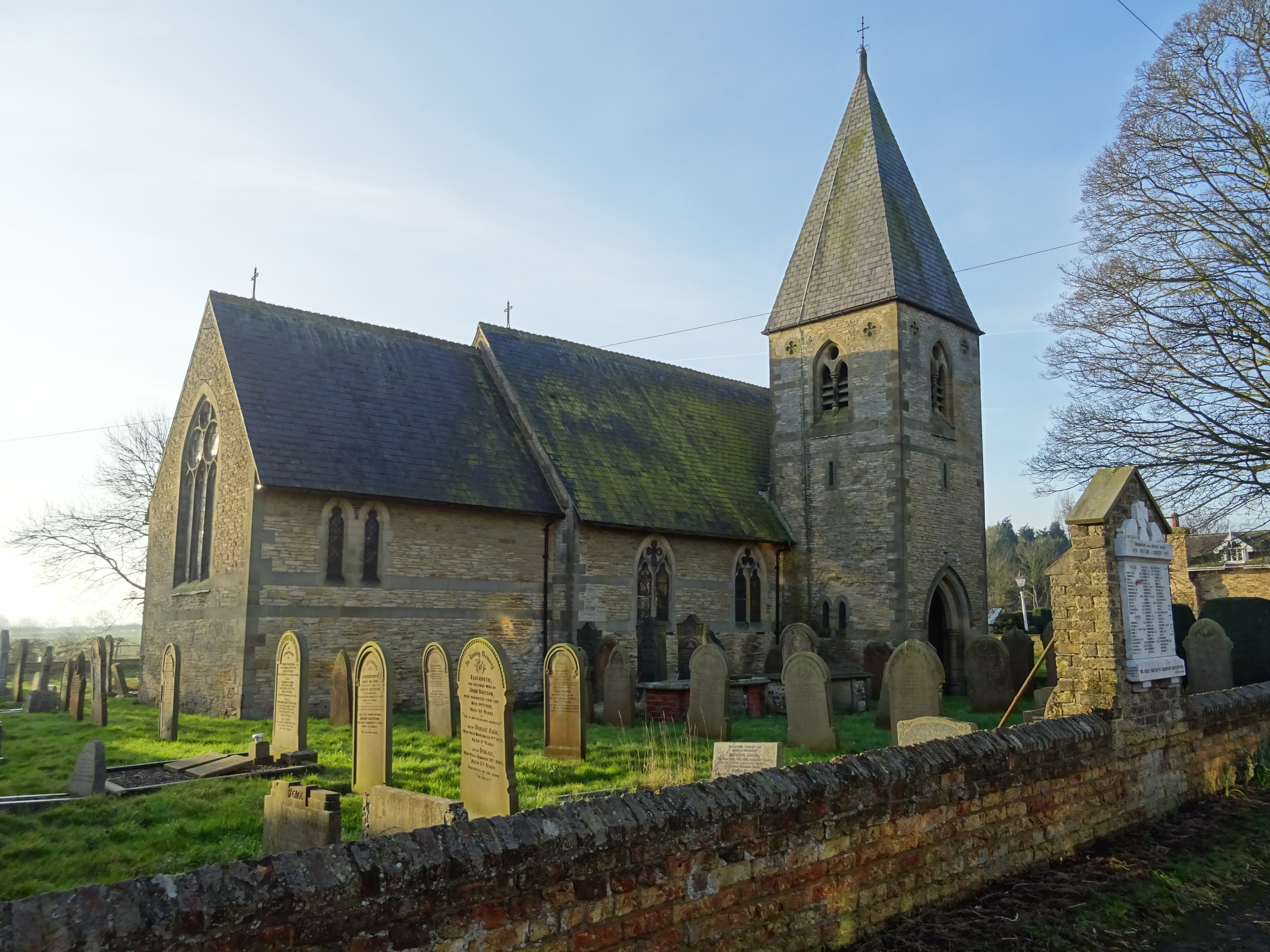
The church, in 2019

St Mary's Church is the parish church of Broomfleet, a village in the East Riding of Yorkshire, in England.

Broomfleet long lay in the parish of All Saints' Church, South Cave. A church was built in the village between 1860 and 1861, with funding from Elizabeth Barnard. The church was designed by John Loughborough Pearson in the Geometric Gothic revival style. Pearson also designed the vicarage, now known as Broomfleet Grange. The church was grade II listed in 1987.

The church is built of limestone with a Welsh slate roof. It consists of a nave, a chancel, and a north tower containing a porch with a pointed doorway. The bell openings have two lights, above these are blind quatrefoils, and a pyramidal roof. Most of the windows are lancets. The east window has mid-19th century stained glass.

== See also ==
- Listed buildings in Broomfleet
