= Horkstow Roman villa =

Coordinates: 53.659484°N 0.51107872°W

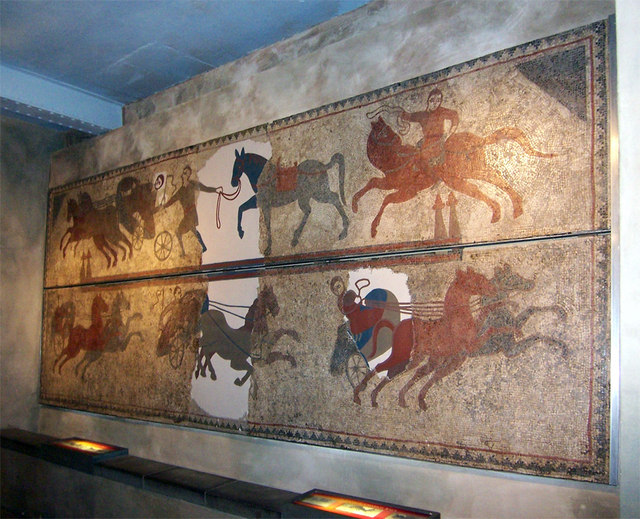
- The 'chariot race' mosaic from Horkstow villa

- Location within Lincolnshire

General information
- Architectural style: Romano-British Villa
- Location: Horkstow, North Lincolnshire grid reference SE98491914, United Kingdom
- Construction started: c.4th century

Horkstow Roman villa is a Roman villa and scheduled monument in Horkstow, North Lincolnshire. It was discovered in 1797 when labourers found a large floor mosaic. A geophysical survey of the site in 1987 identified structural features between the site of the mosaic and the nearby Horkstow Hall, though the full layout of the villa has not yet been discovered.

== Mosaic ==
The mosaics were retained in situ until 1927 when they were moved to the British Museum. They were transferred to Hull and East Riding Museum in 1976. The mosaic consists of three panels. The first depicts Orpheus, the second is known as the 'painted ceiling' and includes several scenes from classical mythology, and the third depicts a chariot race. The Orpheus mosaic is one of thirteen examples of this subject from Roman Britain and is one of the two most northerly examples; the other being at the nearby Winterton Roman villa.
