= Crosby, Lincolnshire =

Area of Scunthorpe, Lincolnshire, England

Coordinates: 53.595°N 0.685°W

Crosby
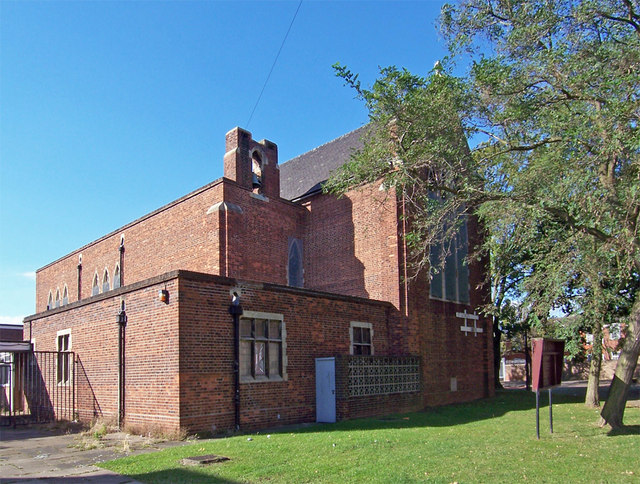
- St George's Church

- Location within Lincolnshire
- Unitary authority: North Lincolnshire
- Ceremonial county: Lincolnshire
- Region: Yorkshire and the Humber
- Country: England
- Sovereign state: United Kingdom
- Post town: SCUNTHORPE
- Postcode district: DN15
- Dialling code: 01724

Crosby was a small hamlet which has grown into a suburb in the north of Scunthorpe, in the North Lincolnshire district of Lincolnshire, England. Remnants of the old hamlet can be found in Old Crosby.

The Anglican Parish Church is St George's Church, Crosby. Located on the corner of Digby Street and Frodingham Road, it was designed by the architect H.C. Corlette. Construction of the church began in 1924 and the building was consecrated in 1926. Its former clergy includes (John Harvard) Christopher Laurence who was Archdeacon Of Lindsey from 1985 to 1994.

The Crosby Angel War Memorial is located on the corner of Frodingham Road and Sheffield Street West in the grounds of the former Crosby Primary School. It is inscribed with the names of 60 men from the area who died in World War One.

The actress Liz Smith was born in Crosby in 1921.

== History ==
Crosby was formerly a township in the parishes of Flixborough and Frodingham, in 1866 Crosby became a separate civil parish, on 1 October 1919 the parish was abolished to form "Scunthorpe and Frodingham", part also went to Flixborough. In 1911 the parish had a population of 3339. From 1889 to 1974 it was in the administrative county of the Parts of Lindsey. From 1974 to 1996 it was in the county of Humberside. Until 1996 it was in Scunthorpe district.
