= Winteringham Haven railway station =

Former railway station in Lincolnshire, England

Coordinates: 53.6949°N 0.5869°W

Winteringham Haven railway station was a port facility on the south bank of the Humber Estuary, Lincolnshire, England. It was constructed by the North Lindsey Light Railway at the end of a 1/2 mile branch line from Winteringham. The railway company provided two chutes to load ships, one for coal the other for slag, a by-product of the iron and steel making process. It was opened on 15 July 1907.

== Route ==
| Preceding station | Disused railways | Following station |
|---|---|---|
| Winteringham | North Lindsey Light Railway | Terminus |
