= Winterton and Thealby railway station =

Former railway station in England

Coordinates: 53.6551°N 0.6281°W

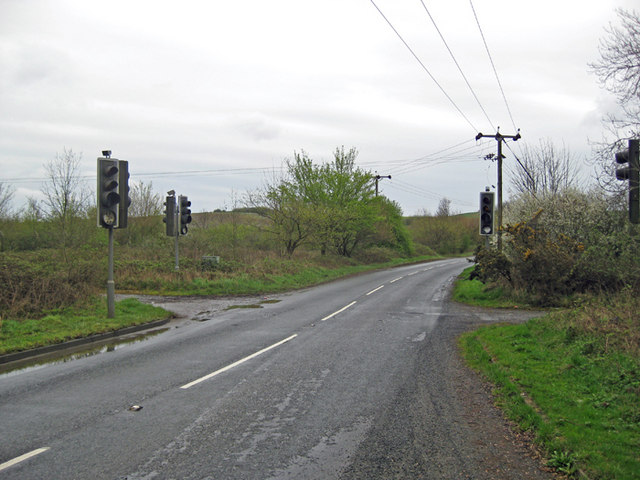
Approximate location of the station

Winterton and Thealby railway station was a station built by the North Lindsey Light Railway in Winterton, Lincolnshire, on their line from Scunthorpe to Winteringham. The station was opened on 3 September 1906 and closed to passengers in 1925. The line closed entirely in 1964.

The first train on the line operated from Dawes Lane as far as this station.

Preceding station	Disused railways	Following station
Normanby Park (Goods)	North Lindsey Light Railway	West Halton

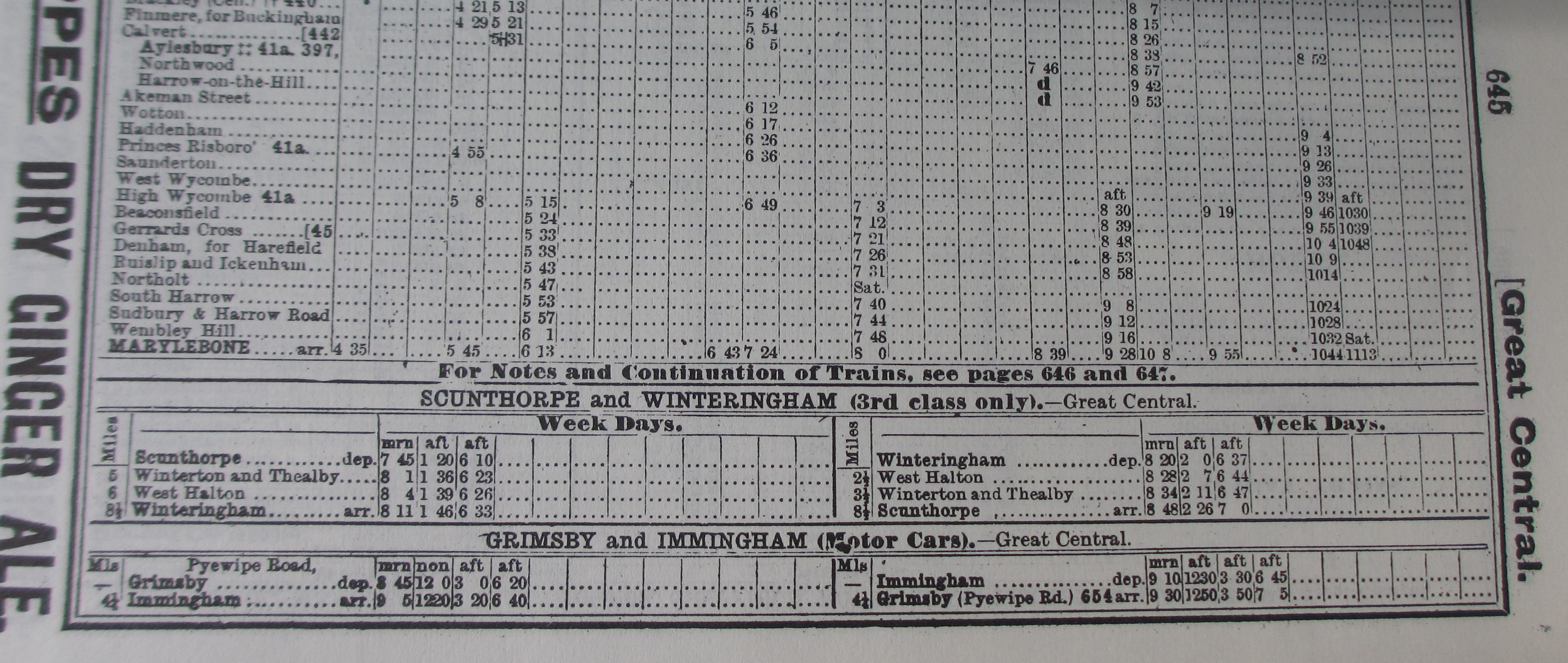
Part of Page 645 of April 1910 British public railway timetable, aka Bradshaw's Guide
