= Normanby Park railway station =

Railway station in Lincolnshire, England

Coordinates: 53.6165°N 0.6392°W

Normanby Park railway station was a goods station, built by the North Lindsey Light Railway, in Normanby, Lincolnshire, England. Situated some 1 7/8 miles from Scunthorpe it opened on 1 August 1912, the increase in traffic on the line being due to the commissioning of new blast furnaces at the nearby works of John Lysaght & Company.

Preceding station	Disused railways	Following station
Dawes Lane	Great Central	Winterton
