= Gunhouse Wharf railway station =

Former railway station in Lincolnshire, England

Coordinates: 53.5876°N 0.7304°W

Gunhouse Wharf railway station was a goods station in Gunness, Lincolnshire. It was built by the Trent, Ancholme and Grimsby Railway to serve a small wharf on the River Trent. It left the main line at Gunhouse Junction, the main line making an end-on junction with the South Yorkshire Railway's line to Doncaster which had been extended over the River Trent by means of Keadby Swing Bridge.

Former Services

Preceding station	Disused railways	Following station
Terminus	Trent, Ancholme & Grimsby	Frodingham
