= Appleby railway station (Lincolnshire) =

Former railway station in Lincolnshire, England

Coordinates: 53.60382°N 0.56071°W

Appleby
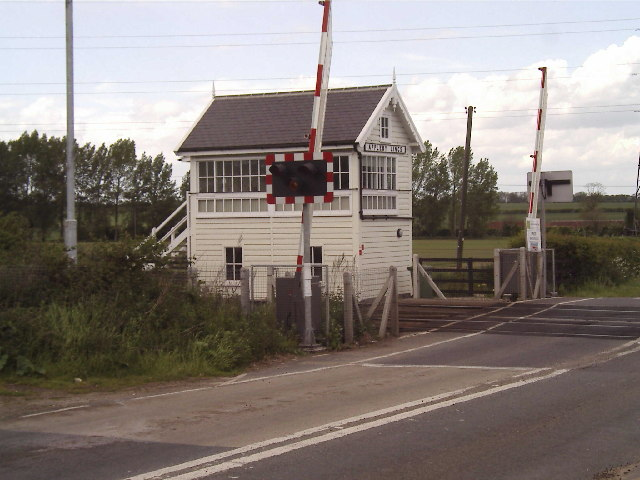
- Signal box and level crossing at the site of Appleby railway station

General information
- Location: Appleby, Lincolnshire; England
- Platforms: 2

Other information
- Status: Disused

History
- Original company: Trent, Ancholme and Grimsby Railway
- Pre-grouping: Great Central Railway
- Post-grouping: London and North Eastern Railway

Key dates
- 1 October 1866: Station opens
- 1 July 1923: Station renamed Appleby (Lincolnshire)
- 5 June 1967: Station closes
Location

Appleby railway station is a former railway station in Appleby, Lincolnshire, England.

Former Services

Preceding station	Disused railways	Following station
Scunthorpe	Trent, Ancholme and Grimsby Railway	Elsham

== History ==
The station was opened by the Trent, Ancholme and Grimsby Railway on its 14 mile long line from Gunness, on the east bank of the Trent where it made an end-on junction with the South Yorkshire Railway's line from Doncaster, and Wrawby Junction, near Barnetby, where it met the main line of the Manchester, Sheffield and Lincolnshire Railway from Retford to Grimsby. The station was, like others on the line, staggered over a level crossing. The line was absorbed by the M. S. & L. R., later becoming the Great Central Railway, becoming part of the London and North Eastern Railway during the Grouping of 1923. The station then passed on to the Eastern Region of British Railways on nationalisation in 1948.

It was then closed by the British Railways Board in June 1967.

== The site today ==
Trains using the South TransPennine line still pass the site of the station.
