= Broomfleet =

Village and civil parish in the East Riding of Yorkshire, England

Coordinates: 53.734688°N 0.664574°W

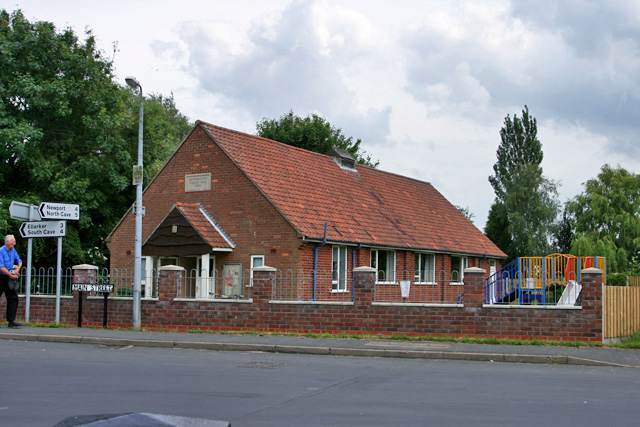
- Broomfleet village hall

- Location within the East Riding of Yorkshire
- Population: 302 (2011 census)
- OS grid reference: SE881273
  - London: 155 mi (249 km) S
- Civil parish: Broomfleet
- Unitary authority: East Riding of Yorkshire
- Ceremonial county: East Riding of Yorkshire
- Region: Yorkshire and the Humber
- Country: England
- Sovereign state: United Kingdom
- Post town: BROUGH
- Postcode district: HU15
- Dialling code: 01430
- Police: Humberside
- Fire: Humberside
- Ambulance: Yorkshire
- UK Parliament: Goole and Pocklington

Broomfleet is a village and civil parish in the East Riding of Yorkshire, England. It is situated on the Humber Estuary approximately 4 miles (6 km) west of Brough. According to the 2011 UK census, Broomfleet parish had a population of 302, an increase on the 2001 UK census figure of 293.

The name Broomfleet derives from the Old English Brungarflēot meaning 'Brungar's estuary or creek'.

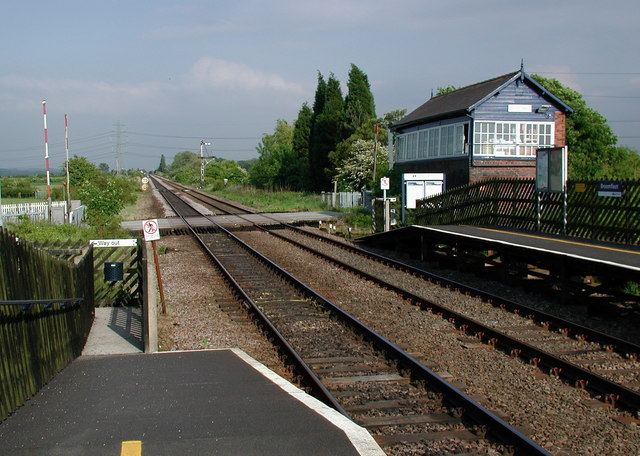
Broomfleet Railway station

The village is served by Broomfleet railway station on the Selby Line.

St Mary's Church, Broomfleet is the local parish church and is designated Grade II listed.

Whitton Island in the Humber Estuary falls partly within the parish. The island was formed from a mud and sandbank at the turn of the 21st century. Broomfleet Island is an area of low-lying land adjacent to the Humber Estuary, which was historically detached from the mainland by the tidal channel of Broomfleet Hope.
