= Winteringham =

Village in Lincolnshire, England

Coordinates: 53.687518°N 0.590724°W

- Village
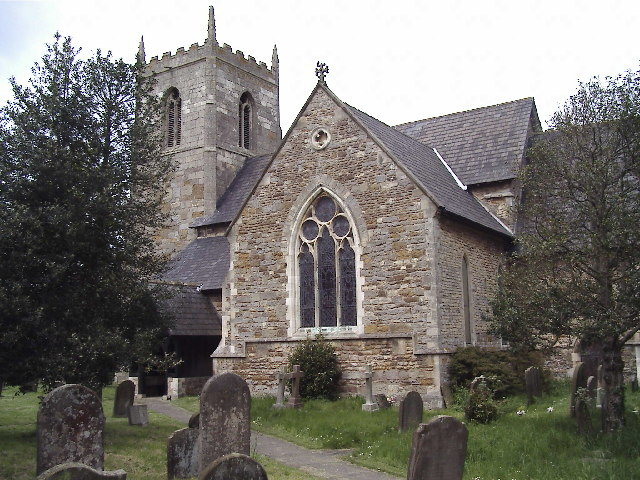
- All Saints' Church, Winteringham

- Location within Lincolnshire
- Population: 1,012 (2021 Census)
- OS grid reference: SE931221
  - London: 155 mi (249 km) SSE
- Unitary authority: North Lincolnshire
- Ceremonial county: Lincolnshire
- Region: Yorkshire and the Humber
- Country: England
- Sovereign state: United Kingdom
- Post town: Scunthorpe
- Postcode district: DN15
- Police: Humberside
- Fire: Humberside
- Ambulance: East Midlands
- UK Parliament: Scunthorpe

Winteringham is a village in North Lincolnshire, England, on the south bank of the Humber Estuary.

== History ==
=== Roman Britain ===
The Romans founded a settlement probably called Ad Abum in this area. It was where Ermine Street, the major Roman road between Londinium (London) and Lincoln, terminated on the south bank of the Humber. Travellers then crossed the river by way of a ferry or low-tide ford to Petuaria (Brough) on the north bank where Cade's Road continued on to Eboracum (York) and Hadrian's Wall. A pre-Roman ridgeway, called Yarlesgate or Earlsgate, may have also resumed here on its route south and south-west towards the Midlands and South West England.

=== Post-Roman ===
The village, and its neighbour Winterton to the south, were possibly named after Wintra – the first King of Lindsey.

=== Norman ===
The Domesday Book of 1086 describes the locale as a prosperous place with three mills, a fishery and a ferry. It became the seat of a branch of the Marmion family.

=== Modern ===
In the 19th century there were two maltkilns, a mill, boatyard, brewery, brickyards and by 1907, the North Lindsey Light Railway.

The Michelin Star Winteringham Fields restaurant is situated near the centre of the village. There is one public house, the Bay Horse at West End. In High Burgage is a corner shop and a post office. In Low Burgage is the local Methodist Chapel, on a road which leads to Winteringham Haven. On Market Hill, off High Burgage, is the local primary school (Winteringham Primary School), on School Road.

Winteringham is also approximately 5 miles (8.0 km) from a wildfowl refuge on the River Humber while also being approximately 1 mile (1.6 km) from the Winteringham Haven Wildlife Reserve.

Henry Kirke White, the Nottingham poet to whom are attributed the words of the hymn "Oft in danger Oft in woe", was educated at the rectory in 1804–05.

== Demographics ==
Its population in the 2001 census was 989. This total had increased to 1,000 at the 2011 census.

== Bibliography ==
- Russell, Rex C.; A History of a Village – Winteringham 1761–1871, Winteringham Local History Group (1980); updated and revised 1999 by Richard Clarke
- Winteringham 1650–1760, Winteringham WEA Branch (1984), edited by David Neave
- A Browse Around Winteringham, Winteringham WEA Branch (1990). ISBN 0-9516809-0-0
- Winteringham a Further Browse, Winteringham WEA Branch (1991)
