= Whitton, Lincolnshire =

Village and civil parish in North Lincolnshire, England

Coordinates: 53.708°N 0.634°W

Whitton
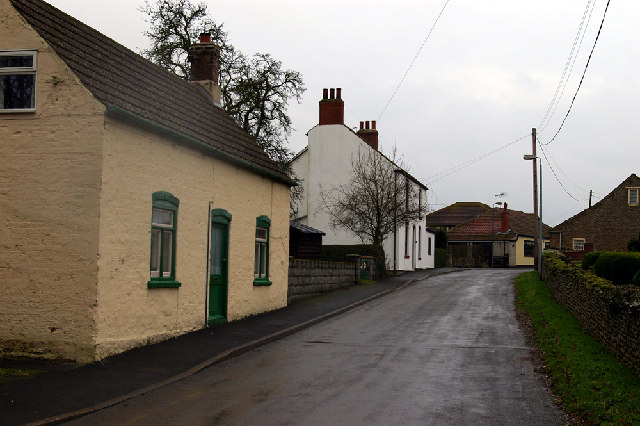
- Chapel Lane, Whitton

- Location within Lincolnshire
- Population: 212 (2011 Census)
- OS grid reference: SE903244
  - London: 155 mi (249 km) SSE
- Unitary authority: North Lincolnshire
- Ceremonial county: Lincolnshire
- Region: Yorkshire and the Humber
- Country: England
- Sovereign state: United Kingdom
- Post town: Scunthorpe
- Postcode district: DN15
- Dialling code: 01724
- Police: Humberside
- Fire: Humberside
- Ambulance: East Midlands
- UK Parliament: Scunthorpe
- Website: Whitton:notes on the history of a village.

Whitton is a village and civil parish in North Lincolnshire, England. The 2011 census found 212 inhabitants, in 92 households. It is situated at the northern termination of the Lincoln Cliff range of hills, on the south shore of the Humber about 3 miles (4.8 km) below Trent Falls, and 9 miles (14 km) west of Barton-upon-Humber. The parish is bounded on the west by Alkborough, on the east by Winteringham (which also includes the Winteringham Haven Wildlife Reserve) and, to the south, by West Halton.

== Toponymy ==
Cameron and Mills have suggested that the place name is an Old English masculine personal name (genitive -n) + Anglian ēg, hence 'Hwita's island of land', but Ekwall thought the name meant ‘White Island’ perhaps assuming wrongly that the ground was chalky. Gelling pointed out that the settlement is situated on an obvious ēg, i.e. an 'island' of dry land, projecting into the Humber Estuary, and surrounded on east and west by former marshy ground.

== History ==
Whitton may have originated at the time the Romans crossed the Humber northward in 71 AD; first as a military camp and then later as a Roman villa, overlooking the river, with its temple a few yards to the east, where the Church now stands. It is possible that Whitton was a landing stage on the south bank for the Roman fort and civitas of Petuaria Parisorum at Brough across the river. Roman Coins of Claudius Gothicus (268–270 AD) and Constantine I (the Great) (309–337 AD) have been found in the fields. Pevsner states that the Church tower "re-uses massive blocks of Roman stone", but these blocks of millstone grit which are to be found in several local churches (such as neighbouring Winteringham) may have been transported down the Ouse and the Humber from York where Roman buildings were being dismantled, or may even have come from some sort of triumphal arch or structure (perhaps like the Arch of Constantine), which might have stood at the end of Ermine Street.

Whitton is mentioned in the 1086 Domesday Book as "Witenai". Before the Conquest lordship was held by Siward Barn, and after by Saswalo of Ettington, with Henry de Ferrers becoming Tenant-in-chief. Listed are 300 acres (1.2 km^{2}) of meadow, land for eight ploughs, two plough teams belonging to the lord, five men's plough teams, ten villans (villagers) four bordars (smallholders) and ten freemen. The land was valued at seven pounds.

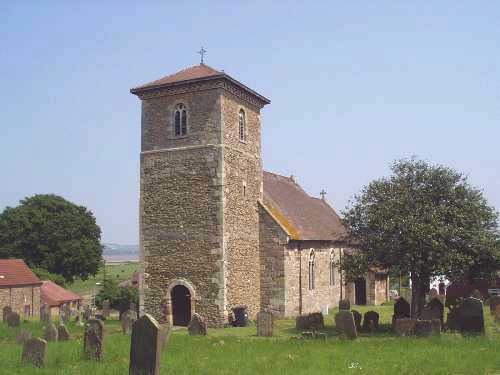
The church of St John the Baptist, Whitton with the Humber Estuary in the background.

The church is not mentioned in the Domesday survey. St. John the Baptist is a building of stone overlooking the Humber, consisting of a west tower, a small nave (22 feet (6.7 m) wide and 37 feet (11.3 m) long) with a chancel and a south vestry attached. The partly Romanesque (or Norman) tower contains three, now untolled, bells; the third bell is said to have been brought from the village of Welton, across the river in Yorkshire. The base of the tower forms a porch and the large tower arch, leading into the nave, is thought to be Romanesque. The font is also ancient and may be from the same period. The church seems to have been almost completely rebuilt in about 1797-8 when the elaborate crocketted pinnacles were removed from the top of the tower. A drawing, by Nattes, of 1794 shows a dilapidated structure with a south aisle and a south porch.

The church was reseated in 1865 at the expense of Lady Strickland, and between about 1892 and 1897 the nave, chancel and roof were entirely rebuilt from the designs of W. & C. A. Bassett-Smith, architects, of London. On the north side of the chancel are two stained-glass windows, erected in 1918 to the memory of Henry Spilman who was killed in the First World War. In 1952–53 cracks in the tower were repaired under the direction of A.R Haynes, architect of Brigg.

A small part of the relatively new island of Whitton Island in the Humber Estuary falls within the parish.

=== Census ===
Census table showing the relative stability of the population:

| Year | Population | Year | Population |
|---|---|---|---|
| 1801 | 207 | 1901 | 173 |
| 1811 | 187 | 1911 | 167 |
| 1821 | 212 | 1921 | 183 |
| 1831 | 245 | 1931 | 196 |
| 1841 | 217 | 1941 | N/A |
| 1851 | 190 | 1951 | 173 |
| 1861 | 215 | 1961 | 180 |
| 1871 | 214 | 1971 | 136 |
| 1881 | 201 | 1981 | 178 |
| 1891 | 204 | 1991 | 173 |
