= Winterton, Lincolnshire =

Market town in North Lincolnshire, England

Coordinates: 53°39′18″N 0°35′52″W

Winterton
- Town
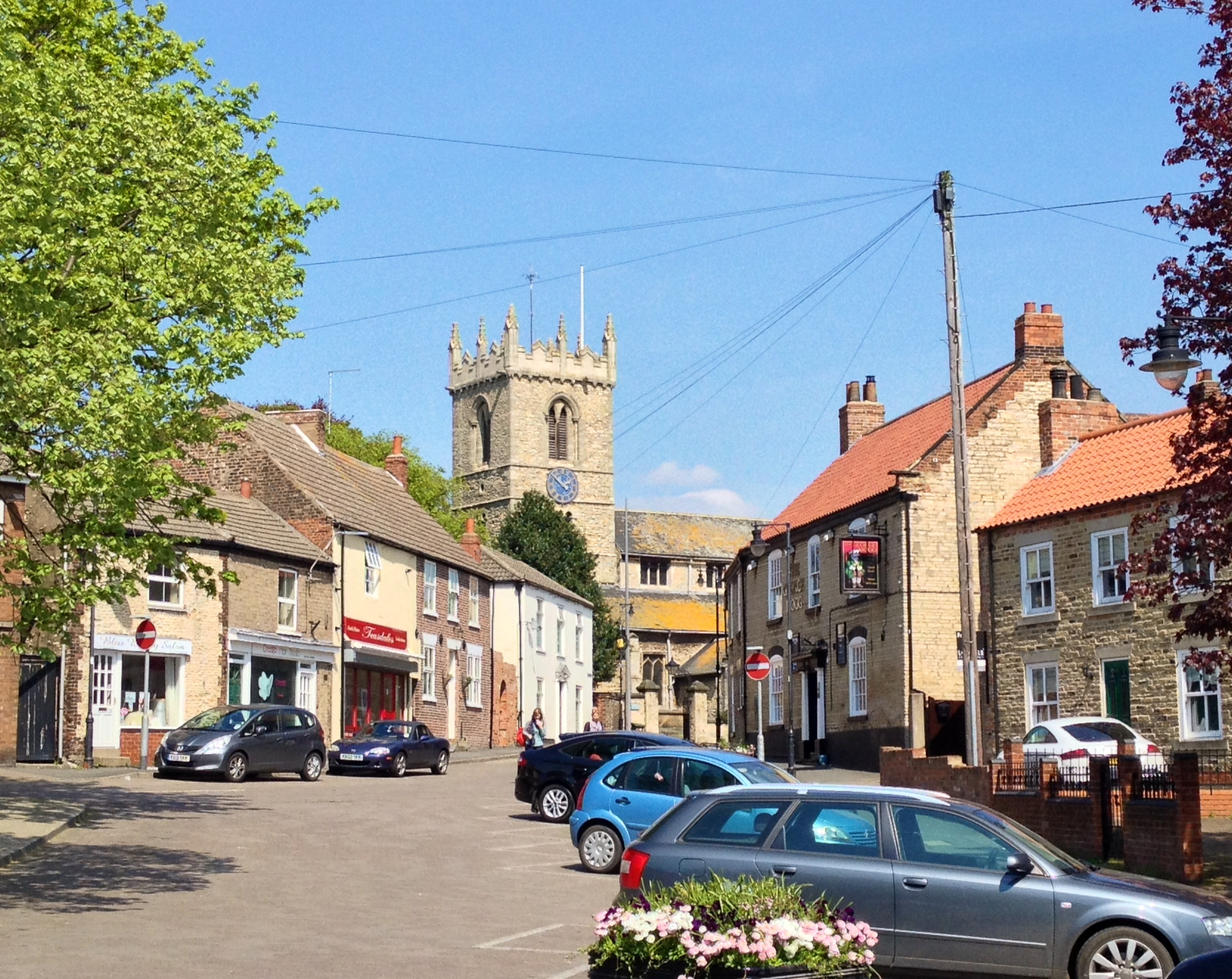
- All Saints' Church, Winterton

- Location within Lincolnshire
- Population: 4,765 (2021 Census)
- OS grid reference: SE926185
  - London: 150 mi (240 km) SSE
- Unitary authority: North Lincolnshire
- Ceremonial county: Lincolnshire
- Region: Yorkshire and the Humber
- Country: England
- Sovereign state: United Kingdom
- Post town: SCUNTHORPE
- Postcode district: DN15
- Dialling code: 01724
- Police: Humberside
- Fire: Humberside
- Ambulance: East Midlands
- UK Parliament: Scunthorpe
- Website: wintertoncouncil.co.uk

Winterton is a market town and civil parish in North Lincolnshire, England, 5 miles (8 km) north-east of Scunthorpe. The 2021 census found 4,765 inhabitants living in the town. Winterton is located near the banks of the Humber and is 8 miles (13 km) south-west of the Humber Bridge which can be seen from many parts of the town.

As of 2022, the mayor of Winterton is Marilynne Harrison.

== History ==
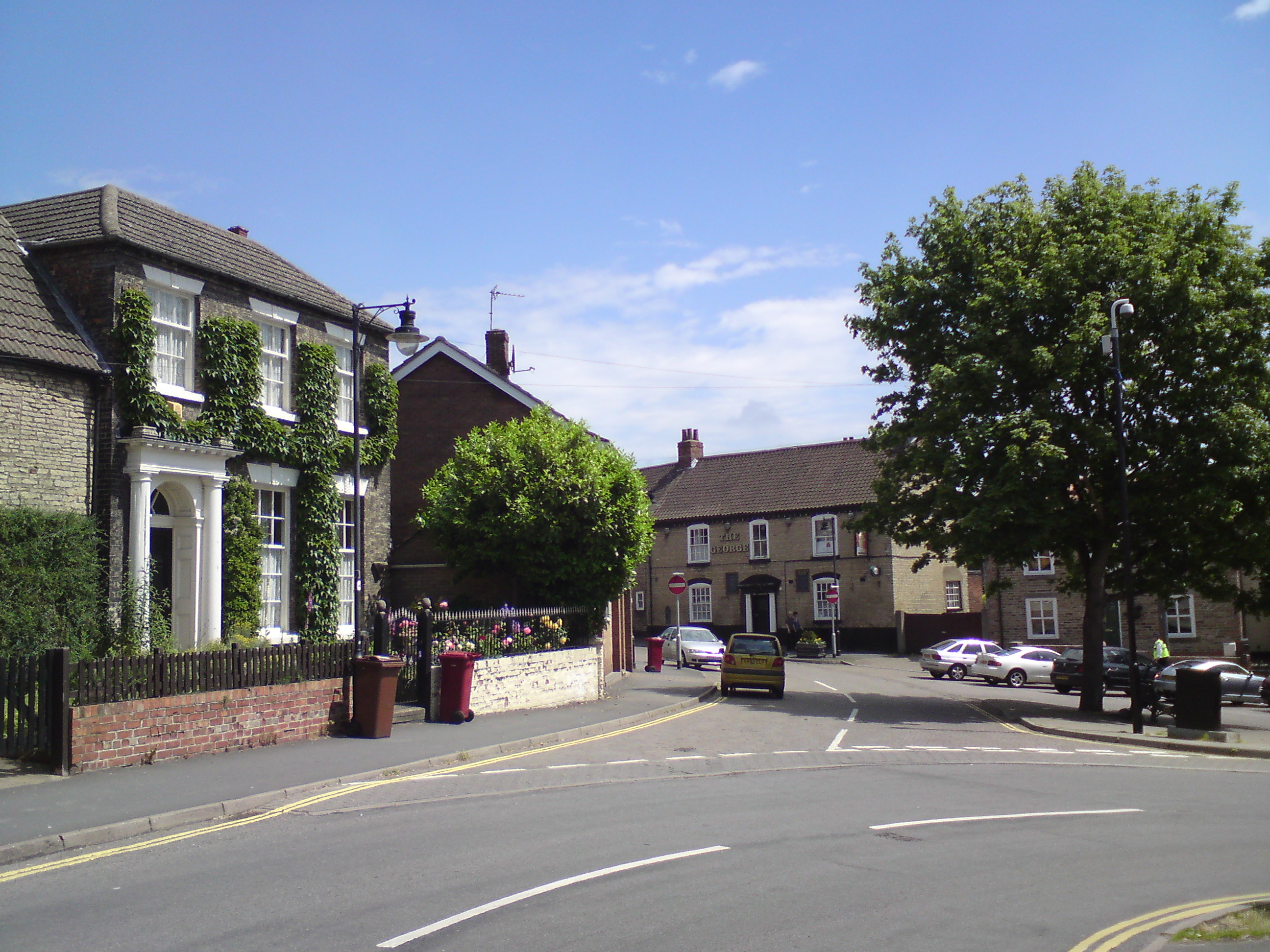
Winterton Marketplace

Winterton has a history going back to Roman times and several large mosaic floors and other Roman remains have been found there.

In October 1968, during road-widening works on the A1077, workers found a massive stone coffin containing a skeleton later identified as being that of a young woman aged between 20 and 25 years of age, who stood 5 ft 3 in (1.60 m) tall (the so-called Winterton Lady). She was of high status, as evidenced by the high quality of the coffin made from a single block of limestone and she was also found to be laid on a sheet of lead. Down the hill from this spot are the remains of one of the Winterton Roman villas, which is famous for its mosaic pavements where it is most likely she lived.

Both Winterton and neighbouring Winteringham seem to contain mention of Winter or Wintra, the first of the kings of Lindsey with any pretence to an historical basis (after the mythological Woden). The position of the two settlements on the south bank of the Humber, close to the point where the main Roman road from the south reaches the river, may be significant, as it is the obvious point from where the settlement of Lindsey is likely to have originated.

The town was also served by the former North Lindsey Light Railway which connected the town to Scunthorpe via Winteringham. The former railway station is now long since closed and is currently disused. The station was between the town and neighbouring village Thealby.

== Winterton Agricultural Show ==
The Winterton Agricultural show is run by Winterton Agricultural Society which was formed in 1872 to further the interests of a rapidly modernising agricultural community. For many years the society held a two-day show in the town.

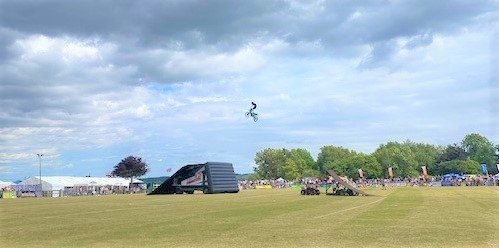
Winterton Show of a previous year

Today, the show occupies over 20 acres, which the society owns to accommodate trade stands, sideshows and entertainment. The show caters for many agricultural and countryside pursuits involving elements of the local and neighbouring communities. It blends a variety of events (such as the funfair) appealing to both rural and town dwellers; as a consequence it draws crowds in excess of twelve thousand from across the region.

== Toponymy ==
The village's name is thought to mean the 'farmstead, the village or the estate of the Winteringas', who were perhaps followers or dependants of someone called Winter or Wintra. In the Domesday Book of 1086 the place is called variously Wintrintune, once; Wintrintone, four times; Wintritone, twice and Wintretune, once.

== Notable people ==
- Wallace Sargent – Former director of the Palomar Observatory, he was one of the world's foremost astronomers and a leading academic at the California Institute of Technology. Born in nearby Elsham, he attended school at Winterton Primary School
- Neville Tong – cyclist
- William Fowler – (1761–1832); artist, architect and builder

== Twinning ==
Winterton has been twinned with Saffré in France since 1993.

== See also ==
- Winterton Community Academy
