= Scunthorpe (Dawes Lane) railway station =

Former railway station in England

Coordinates: 53.5904°N 0.6368°W

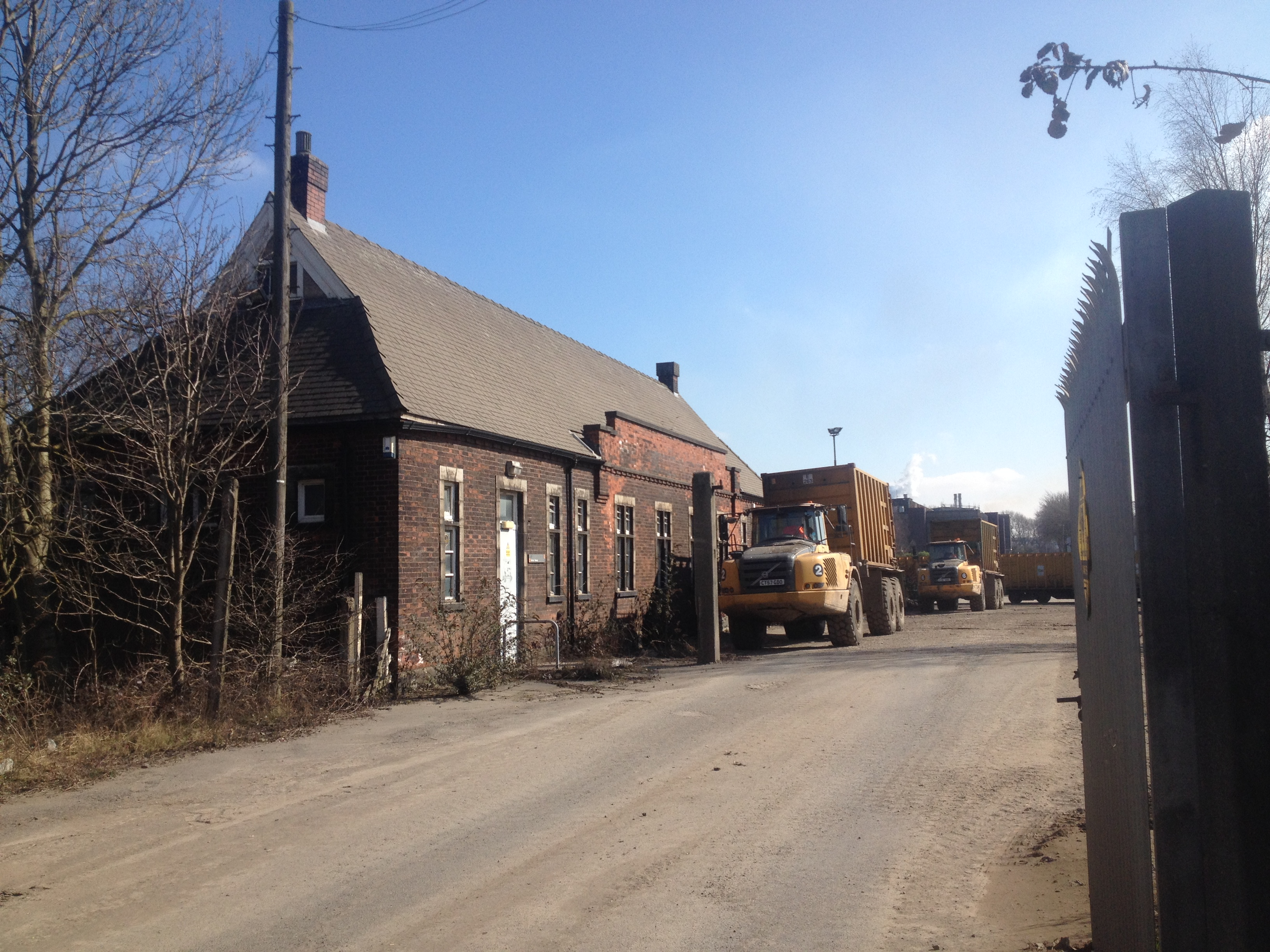
The site of the station in March 2016

Scunthorpe (Dawes Lane) railway station was a small railway station, the original southern terminus of the North Lindsey Light Railway situated adjacent to the level crossing on Dawes Lane and about 1/2 mile east of the present mainline station, opened in 1926, and about 1/8 mile east of Frodingham railway station, Scunthorpe's first station.

The station was opened on 3 September 1906 with a service to Winterton and Thealby. Passenger services ended on 13 July 1925 but the section of line through the station is still open in connection with bulk waste trains from sites on Greater Manchester to a landfill at Roxby mines.

Preceding station	Disused railways	Following station
Terminus	North Lindsey Light Railway	Normanby Park (Goods)
