= Trent, Ancholme and Grimsby Railway =

Railway in Lincolnshire, England

The Trent, Ancholme and Grimsby Railway was a railway line in north Lincolnshire which commenced at an end on junction with the South Yorkshire Railway where that railway crossed the River Trent near the village of Gunhouse. This was known as Gunhouse Junction but the village has become known as "Gunness". The line ran for about 14 miles (22.5 km) through Frodingham to Wrawby Junction near Barnetby and included railway stations at Appleby, and Elsham. The line also included two branches to Gunness and Gunhouse Wharf on the River Trent. The line was opened on 1 October 1866.

The line was worked, and later absorbed into by the Manchester, Sheffield and Lincolnshire Railway (MS&LR). The MS&LR became the Great Central Railway and on grouping to the LNER. The 14 mile main line is still open and is heavily used, the two branches have closed.

== Acts ==
Trent, Ancholme, and Grimsby Railway Act 1861
- Act of Parliament
- Parliament of the United Kingdom
- Long title: An Act to authorize the Construction in Lincolnshire of a Railway from the River Trent across the River Ancholme to the Manchester, Sheffield, and Lincolnshire Railway.
- Citation: 24 & 25 Vict. c. clvi

Dates
- Royal assent: 22 July 1861

Trent, Ancholme and Grimsby Railway Act 1862
- Act of Parliament
- Parliament of the United Kingdom
- Long title: An Act to authorize the South Yorkshire Railway and River Dun Company, and the Manchester, Sheffield, and Lincolnshire Railway Company to contribute Funds towards and to acquire the Undertaking of the Trent, Alcholme, and Grimsby Railway Company.
- Citation: 25 & 26 Vict. c. cxxix

Dates
- Royal assent: 7 July 1862

Text of statute as originally enacted

Trent, Ancholme and Grimsby Railway Act 1864
- Act of Parliament
- Parliament of the United Kingdom
- Long title: An Act to enable the Trent, Ancholme, and Grimsby Railway Company to raise further Money.
- Citation: 27 & 28 Vict. c. lxv

Dates
- Royal assent: 23 June 1864

- Trent, Ancholme, and Grimsby Railway Act 1861 (24 & 25 Vict. c. clvi); An Act to authorize the Construction in Lincolnshire of a Railway from the River Trent across the River Ancholme to the Manchester, Sheffield, and Lincolnshire Railway.
  - "Trent, Ancholme, and Grimsby Railway. (Railway from the Trent, near Keadby, to Barnetby-le-Wold.)", London Gazette (22449): 4372–3, 20 November 1860
- Trent, Ancholme, and Grimsby Railway Act 1862 (25 & 26 Vict. c. 129); An Act to authorize the South Yorkshire Railway and River Dun Company, and the Manchester, Sheffield, and Lincolnshire Railway Company to contribute Funds towards and to acquire the Undertaking of the Trent, Alcholme, and Grimsby Railway Company
  - "Trent, Ancholme, and Grimsby Railway. (Further Powers to Manchester, Sheffield, and Lincolnshire Railway, and to South Yorkshire Railway and River Dun Companies.)", London Gazette (22569): 4926, 26 November 1861
- Trent, Ancholme and Grimsby Railway Act 1864 (27 & 28 Vict. c. 65); An Act to enable the Trent, Ancholme, and Grimsby Railway Company to raise further Money
  - "Trent, Ancholme, and Grimsby Railway. (Increase of Capital; Powers to South Yorkshire and Manchester, Sheffield, and Lincolnshire Railway Companies).", London Gazette (22791): 5775, 24 November 1863
- Manchester, Sheffield and Lincolnshire Railway and Cheshire Lines Act 1882 (45 & 46 Vict. c. 116);
  - "Manchester, Sheffield, and Lincolnshire Railway and Cheshire Lines (Additional Powers.) [..] Railway Companies — Transfer of Trent, Ancholme, and Grimsby Railway, and dissolution of that Company [..] and other purposes", London Gazette (25039): 5661–5664, 18 November 1881
