= North Lindsey Light Railway =

Railway in Lincolnshire, England

The North Lindsey Light Railway (NLLR) was a light railway in North Lincolnshire. The line was worked from its opening in 1906 by the Great Central Railway and in 1923, on grouping, it passed to the London and North Eastern Railway. The railway is now mostly closed.

== Route ==
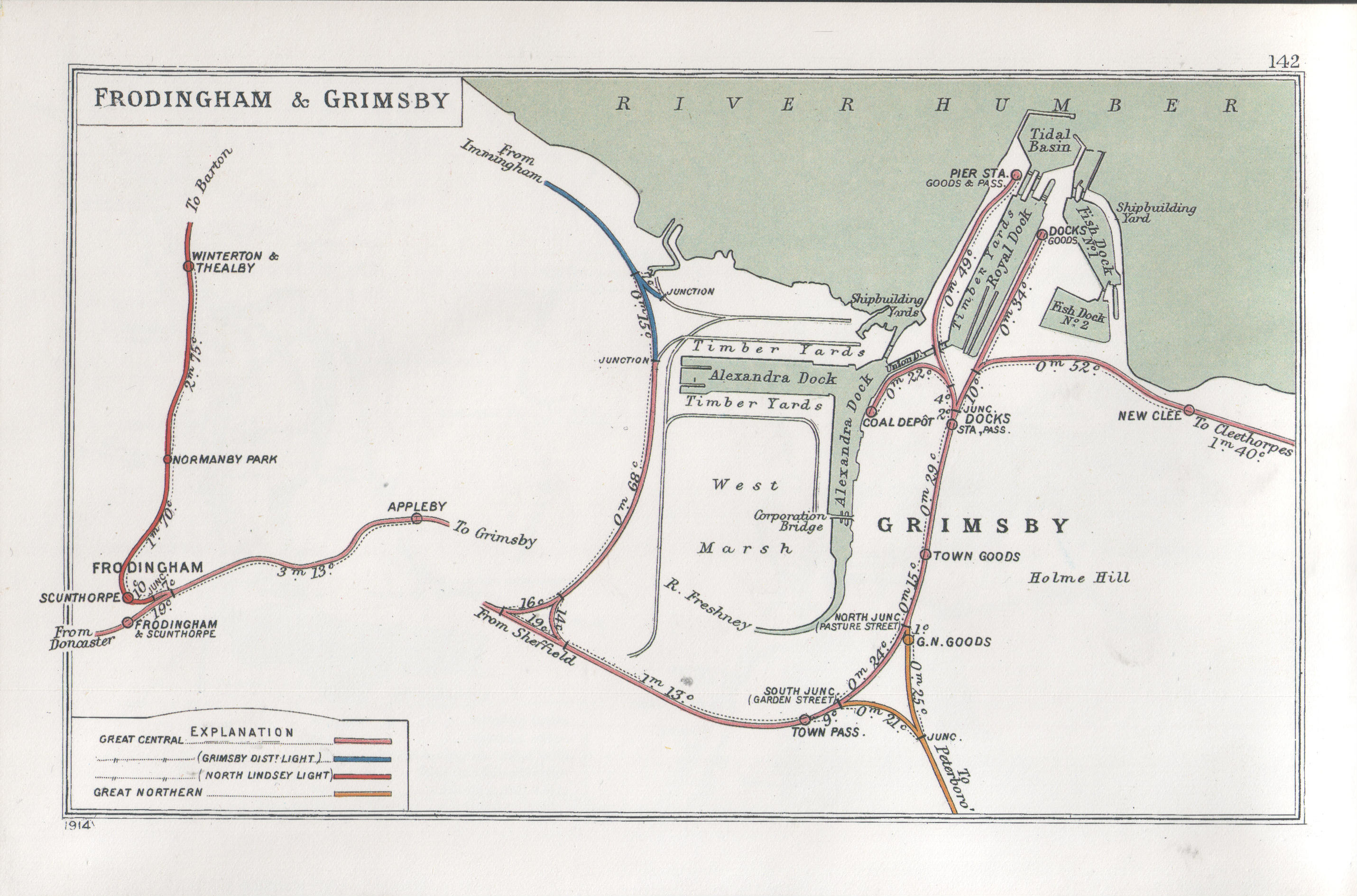
A 1914 Railway Clearing House map showing (left) the southern end of the North Lindsey Light Railway (in red)

The line had its own station in Scunthorpe at Dawes Lane some 1/2 mi (0.80 km) from Frodingham on the Great Central Railway's Doncaster to Cleethorpes route. The NLLR was originally connected to the Great Central by a connection through Frodingham station goods yard, facing towards Grimsby, but in the 1920s a further connection facing towards Keadby was added, forming a triangle.

The ceremonial first sod was cut at Thealby by Sir Berkeley Sheffield on 7 January 1901. The line opened in 1906 as far as Winterton and Thealby, and was extended through West Halton to Winteringham in 1907 before reaching Whitton in 1910. An additional station for goods was opened at Normanby Park to deal with traffic to John Lysaght's works nearby.

There were docks on the banks of the Humber Estuary at Winteringham Haven.

== History ==
The line was backed and operated by the Great Central Railway; its strategic importance to them was to prevent the Lancashire and Yorkshire Railway from encroaching into their territory by crossing the River Trent.

Passenger services ended on 13 July 1925 and the line from Winteringham to Whitton closed in 1951, followed by the section to West Halton in 1961. The line remained open as far as Winterton until 1980 for iron ore traffic and part of the line still exists at the Scunthorpe end to access a landfill site near Roxby, which receives trainloads of household rubbish from various locations in Greater Manchester and Leeds.

== Bibliography ==
- "THE NORTH LINDSEY LIGHT RAILWAY". The Lincolnshire & East Yorkshire Transport Review. Archived from the original on 18 September 2007.
- "The North Lindsey Light Railway". Winteringham.info. Archived from the original on 17 March 2007.
