= Frodingham railway station =

Former railway station in Lincolnshire, England

Coordinates: 53.5881°N 0.6376°W

Frodingham

General information
- Location: Frodingham, North Lincolnshire; England

Other information
- Status: Disused

History
- Original company: Trent, Ancholme and Grimsby Railway
- Pre-grouping: Great Central Railway
- Post-grouping: London and North Eastern Railway

Key dates
- 1 October 1866: Opened
- October 1886: resited
- 1928: closed
Location

Frodingham railway station was a railway station in Frodingham, Lincolnshire, England. It was open by the Trent, Ancholme, and Grimsby Railway on 1 October 1866 and, like all the others built by that company, had staggered platforms set around the level crossing on the Brigg Road. The first station here was closed in autumn 1886, when a new Frodingham station, built by the Manchester, Sheffield and Lincolnshire Railway, was opened, to the west of the Brigg Road level crossing. This station was suffixed "and Scunthorpe" at some date and was closed in 1928, when the LNER opened a new station which it named Scunthorpe nearer to the town centre.
