= North Lincolnshire Council elections =

Local government elections in Lincolnshire, England

North Lincolnshire Council is the local authority for the unitary authority of North Lincolnshire in Lincolnshire, England. It was created on 1 April 1996 replacing Glanford, Scunthorpe, part of Boothferry and Humberside County Council.

== Council elections ==
- 1995 North Lincolnshire Council election
- 1999 North Lincolnshire Council election
- 2003 North Lincolnshire Council election (New ward boundaries)
- 2007 North Lincolnshire Council election
- 2011 North Lincolnshire Council election
- 2015 North Lincolnshire Council election
- 2019 North Lincolnshire Council election
- 2023 North Lincolnshire Council election (New ward boundaries)

== Election results ==
	Overall control	Conservative	Labour	Lib Dems	Independent
2023	Conservative	27	16	0	0
2019	Conservative	27	16	0	0
2015	Conservative	26	17	0	0
2011	Conservative	23	20	0	0
2007	Labour	19	22	1	1
2003	Conservative	22	21	0	0

== District result maps ==
2003 results map

2007 results map

2011 results map

2015 results map

2019 results map

2023 results map

== By-election results ==
=== 1995–1999 ===
Ashby By-Election 24 July 1997
Party	Candidate	Votes	%	±%
Labour		889	72.4	−11.7
Conservative		252	20.5	+4.6
Liberal Democrats		87	7.1	+7.1
Majority		637	51.9	
Turnout		1,228	15.6	
Labour hold		Swing		

=== 1999–2003 ===
Burton-upon-Stather and Guness By-Election 30 November 2000
Party	Candidate	Votes	%	±%
Conservative	Tracy Muir	854	52.0	−0.7
Labour	David Oldfield	631	38.5	−8.8
Independent	Frank Bottamley	156	9.5	+9.5
Majority		223	13.5	
Turnout		1,641	31.5	
Conservative hold		Swing		

=== 2003–2007 ===
Broughton and Appleby By-Election 18 December 2003
Party	Candidate	Votes	%	±%
Conservative	Ivan Glover	891	49.1	+0.9
Labour	Ken Edgell	790	43.6	+2.3
Liberal Democrats	Val Margetts	132	7.3	−3.2
Majority		101	5.5	
Turnout		1,813	35.6	
Conservative hold		Swing		

Crosby & Park By-Election 27 January 2005
Party	Candidate	Votes	%	±%
Labour	Christine O'Sullivan	1,044	54.9	−4.4
Liberal Democrats	Neil Poole	414	21.8	+8.8
Conservative	Michael Sykes	258	13.5	−1.1
BNP	Robert Bailey	186	9.8	+9.8
Majority		630	33.1	
Turnout		1,902	22.6	
Labour hold		Swing		

Ashby By-Election 21 April 2005
Party	Candidate	Votes	%	±%
Labour	Michael Collinson	1,151	68.0	+14.7
Conservative	Alec Readhead	328	19.4	−5.8
Liberal Democrats	John Thompson	213	12.6	−8.9
Majority		823	48.6	
Turnout		1,692	23.2	
Labour hold		Swing		

Brumby By-Election 8 December 2005
Party	Candidate	Votes	%	±%
Labour	Leonard Foster	796	66.5	+6.3
Conservative	Lawrence Chapman	249	20.8	−1.3
Liberal Democrats	Adrian Holmes	152	12.7	−5.0
Majority		547	45.7	
Turnout		1,197	14.3	
Labour hold		Swing		

Ridge By-Election 8 December 2005
Party	Candidate	Votes	%	±%
Conservative	Trevor Foster	1,154	37.4	−13.3
Liberal Democrats	Neil Poole	1,102	35.7	+9.1
Labour	Alan May	656	21.3	−1.5
Independent	Andrew Talliss	175	5.7	+5.7
Majority		52	1.7	
Turnout		3,087	31.5	
Conservative hold		Swing		

=== 2007–2011 ===
Barton By-Election 21 May 2009
Party	Candidate	Votes	%	±%
Conservative	Paul Vickers	1,576	64.35	−0.52
Labour	Sue Turner	653	26.66	+6.18
Liberal Democrats	Richard Alan Nixon	220	8.98	+1.93
Majority		873	35.65	
Turnout		2,449		
Conservative hold		Swing		

=== 2011–2015 ===
Town By-Election 31 May 2012
Party	Candidate	Votes	%	±%
Labour	Haque Kataria	1,141	50.9	+1.4
Conservative	Abdul Wadud	956	42.7	+5.3
BNP	Douglas Ward	143	6.4	+6.4
Majority		185	8.3	
Turnout		2,240		
Labour hold		Swing		

=== 2015–2019 ===
Brumby By-Election 8 June 2017
Party	Candidate	Votes	%	±%
Labour	Stephen Swift	2,428	56.5	+3.2
Conservative	Janet Longcake	1,356	31.5	+31.5
UKIP	Dave Carswell	270	6.3	−28.7
Independent	Paul Elsom	177	4.1	+4.1
Independent	Graham Wagstaffe	70	1.6	+1.6
Majority		1,072	24.9	
Turnout		4,301		
Labour hold		Swing		

=== 2019–2023 ===
Ashby By-Election 6 May 2021
Party	Candidate	Votes	%	±%
Conservative	Joanne Saunby	1,137	50.8	+19.1
Labour	Christopher Skinner	980	43.8	−24.5
Green	Peter Dennington	119	5.3	+5.3
Majority		157	7.0	
Turnout		2,236		
Conservative gain from Labour		Swing		

Bottesford By-Election 6 May 2021
Party	Candidate	Votes	%	±%
Conservative	Janet Longcake	2,084	73.3	+16.5
Labour	Glyn Williams	1,088	26.7	−16.5
Majority		1,896	46.6	
Turnout		4,072		
Conservative hold		Swing		

Broughton and Appleby By-Election 6 May 2021
Party	Candidate	Votes	%	±%
Conservative	Carol Ross	1,217		
Conservative	Janet Lee	1,141		
Labour	Graham Ladlow	412		
Labour	Lucy Watson	450		
Green	Jo Baker	99		
Green	Amie Watson	82		
For Britain	Mike Speakman	34		
Turnout		3353		
Conservative hold		Swing		
Conservative hold		Swing		

=== 2023–2027 ===
Axholme North By-Election 6 June 2024
Party	Candidate	Votes	%	±%
Conservative	Ian Bint	901	66.9	+8.7
Labour	Lara Chaplin	378	28.1	−3.9
Liberal Democrats	Alan Kelly	67	5.0	+5.0
Majority		523	38.9	
Turnout		1,346		
Conservative hold		Swing		

Brumby By-Election 6 June 2024
Party	Candidate	Votes	%	±%
Labour	Daniel Hart	616	61.5	−9.9
Conservative	Alan Cook	294	29.3	+0.7
Green	Peter Dennington	49	4.9	+4.9
Liberal Democrats	Robin Abram	43	4.3	+4.3
Majority		322	32.1	
Turnout		1,002		
Labour hold		Swing		

Axholme Central By-Election 26 March 2026
Party	Candidate	Votes	%	±%
Conservative	Caroline Finch	925	49.2	−19.6
Reform	Gerrad Farmer	668	35.5	+35.5
Green	Alex Ellis	157	8.3	+8.3
Labour	Matthew Rawcliffe	103	5.5	−25.7
Liberal Democrats	Michael Shaw	28	1.5	+1.5
Majority		257	13.7	
Turnout		1,881		
Conservative hold		Swing		

Brumby By-Election 26 March 2026
Party	Candidate	Votes	%	±%
Reform	Ellen Dew	769	52.3	+52.3
Labour	Thomas Smith	410	27.9	−43.5
Green	Sam Hewson	133	9.1	+9.1
Conservative	Joanne Saunby	110	7.5	−21.1
Liberal Democrats	Alan Kelly	47	3.2	+3.2
Majority		359	24.4	
Turnout		1,469		
Reform gain from Labour		Swing		
