= Broughton and Appleby =

Electoral ward in North Lincolnshire, England

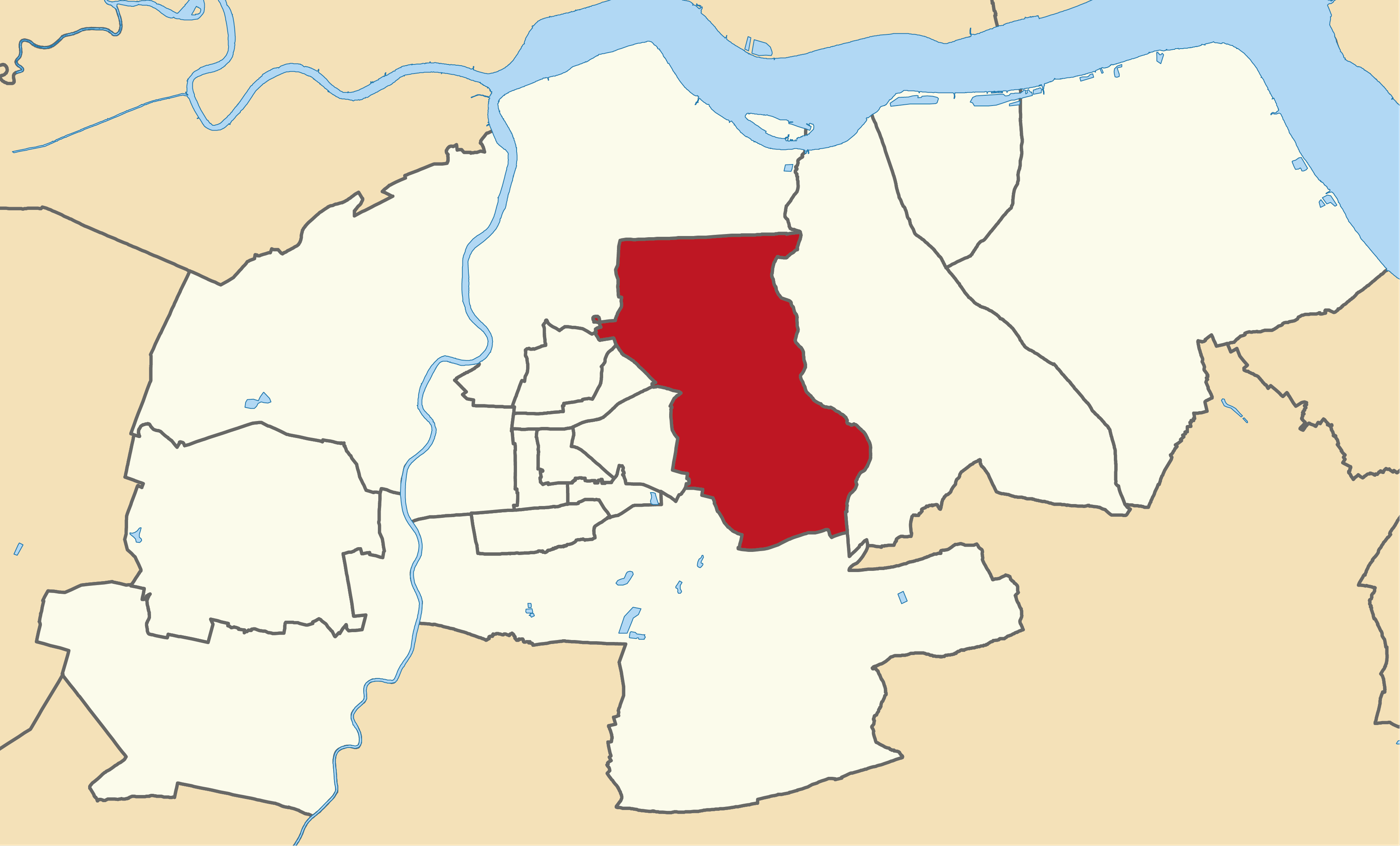
- Broughton and Appleby within North Lincolnshire
- Population: 6,589 (2019)
- Region: Yorkshire and the Humber
- Country: England
- Sovereign state: United Kingdom
- UK Parliament: Brigg and Immingham
- Councillors: Janet Lee (Conservative); Carol Ross (Conservative)

Broughton and Appleby is an electoral ward in North Lincolnshire. It elects two councillors to North Lincolnshire Council using the first past the post electoral method, electing both councillors every four years. Since its creation in 2003 after boundary changes, it has continually elected Conservative councillors.

== Geography ==
The ward encompasses the town of Broughton to the south along with the hamlets of Wressle, Castlethorpe, and Scawby Brook. The ward borders Ridge to south, separated by the A18 and the River Ancholme. Brigg and Wolds to the east, Frodingham, Town, and Crosby and Park to the west, and Burton upon Stather and Winterton to the North. To the north of the ward is the village of Appleby.

== Councillors ==
Broughton and Appleby is represented in Westminster as part of the Brigg and Immingham constituency.

The ward is represented on North Lincolnshire Council by two councillors: Janet Lee and Carol Ross. Both councillors were elected in the 2021 by-election to replace former councillor, Holly Mumby-Croft, who was elected to Parliament for the Scunthorpe Constituency in 2019. The other councillor Ivan Glover died in early 2020, shortly after the 2019 council election.

Election	Councillor	Councillor
2003	A Bunyan (Conservative)	I Glover (Conservative)
2007	A Bunyan (Conservative)	I Glover (Conservative)
2011	A Bunyan (Conservative)	I Glover (Conservative)
2015	H Mumby-Croft (Conservative)	I Glover (Conservative)
2019	H Mumby-Croft (Conservative)	I Glover (Conservative)
2021 By-Election	J Lee (Conservative)	C Ross (Conservative)

== Electoral history ==
=== 2021 By-election ===
Broughton and Appleby By-Election 6 May 2021
Party	Candidate	Votes	%	±%
Conservative	Janet Lee	1141	70.3%	▲8.4%
Conservative	Carol Elizabeth Ross	1217		
For Britain	Mike Speakman	34	1.0%	
Green	Jo Baker	99	5.3%	▼9.0%
Green	Amie Watson	82		
Labour	Graham Ladlow	412	25.7%	▲2.0%
Labour	Lucy Watson	450		
Majority		1496	44.6%	▲6.4%
Turnout		3353		
Conservative hold		Swing		

=== 2019 Council Election ===
Broughton & Appleby
Party	Candidate	Votes	%	±%
Conservative	Holly Mumby-Croft	1,210	61.9	
Conservative	Ivan Glover	1,205		
Labour	Cath Whittingham	464	23.7	
Labour	Mo Whitaker-Clark	388		
Green	Katie Graham	280	14.3	
Turnout				
Conservative hold				
Conservative hold				

=== 2011 Council Election ===
Broughton and Appleby
Party	Candidate	Votes	%	±%
Conservative	Ivan Glover	1,269	30.71	
Conservative	Arthur Bunyan	1,262	30.54	
Labour	Bernard Grainger	904	21.88	
Labour	Paul Redfern	696	16.84	
Turnout		2,267	42.7%	
