= Electoral history of Keir Starmer =

Elections featuring UK Prime Minister

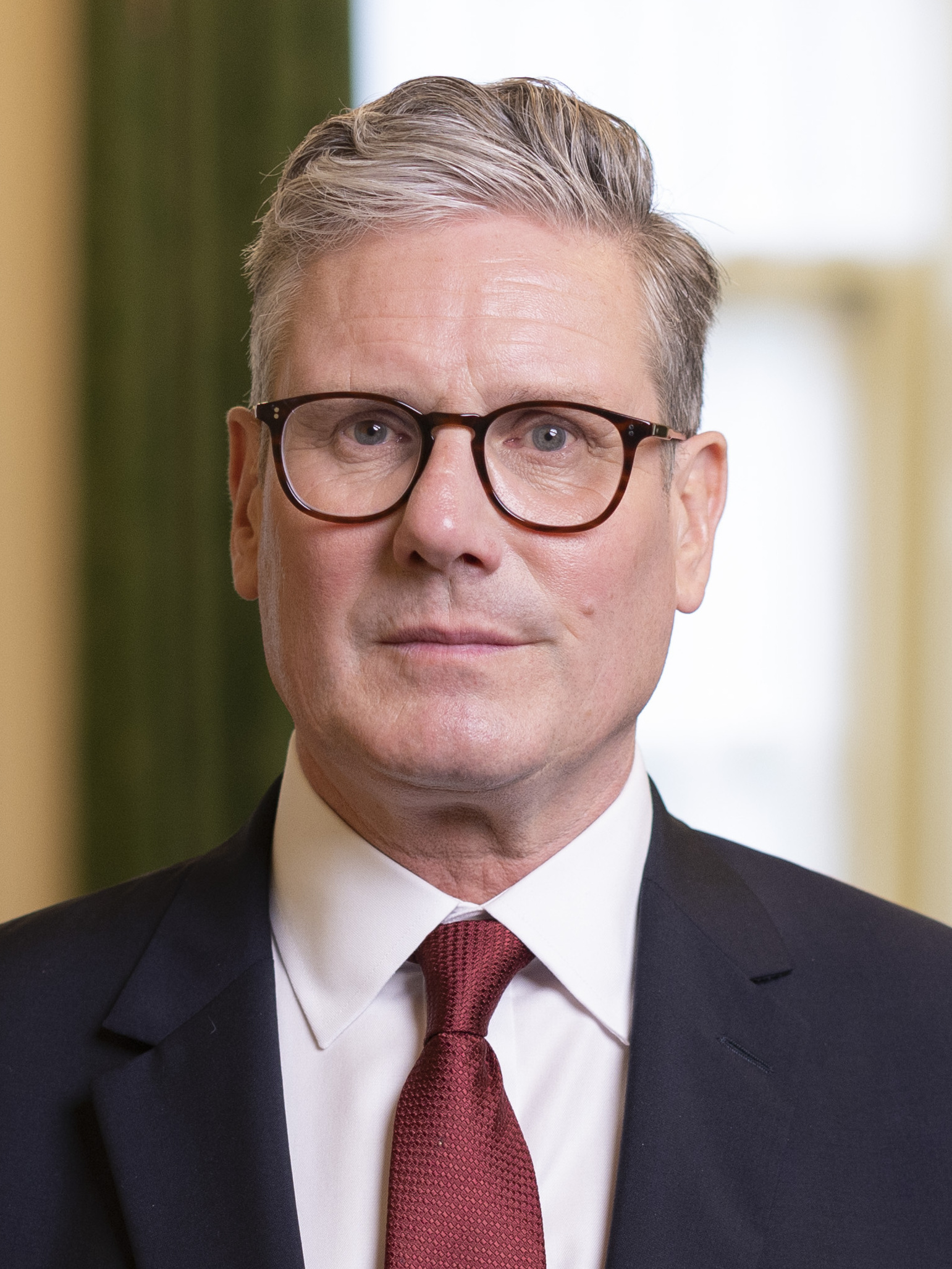
Official portrait, 2024

Keir Starmer is a British politician and barrister who served as Prime Minister of the United Kingdom from 2024 to 2026 and Leader of the Labour Party from 2020 to 2026. He was previously Member of Parliament (MP) for Holborn and St Pancras from 2015 to 2026 and Leader of the Opposition from 2020 to 2024.

== Parliamentary elections ==
=== 2015 general election, Holborn and St Pancras ===
General election 2015: Holborn and St Pancras
| Party | Candidate | Votes | % | ±% |
|---|---|---|---|---|
| Labour | Keir Starmer | 29,062 | 52.9 | +6.8 |
| Conservative | Will Blair | 12,014 | 21.9 | +1.5 |
| Green | Natalie Bennett | 7,013 | 12.8 | +10.1 |
| Liberal Democrats | Jill Fraser | 3,555 | 6.5 | −21.4 |
| UKIP | Maxine Spencer | 2,740 | 5.0 | +3.9 |
| CISTA | Shane O'Donnell | 252 | 0.5 | N/A |
| Animal Welfare | Vanessa Hudson | 173 | 0.3 | N/A |
| Socialist Equality | David O'Sullivan | 108 | 0.2 | N/A |
| Majority | | 17,048 | 31.0 | +13.2 |
| Turnout | | 54,917 | 63.3 | +0.4 |
| Registered electors | | 86,764 | | |
| Labour hold | | Swing | +2.6 | |

=== 2017 general election, Holborn and St Pancras ===
General election 2017: Holborn and St Pancras
| Party | Candidate | Votes | % | ±% |
|---|---|---|---|---|
| Labour | Keir Starmer | 41,343 | 70.1 | +17.2 |
| Conservative | Timothy Barnes | 10,834 | 18.4 | −3.5 |
| Liberal Democrats | Stephen Crosher | 4,020 | 6.8 | +0.3 |
| Green | Siân Berry | 1,980 | 3.4 | −9.4 |
| UKIP | Giles Game | 727 | 1.2 | −3.8 |
| English Democrat | Janus Polenceus | 93 | 0.2 | N/A |
| Majority | | 30,509 | 51.7 | +20.7 |
| Turnout | | 58,997 | 67.0 | +3.7 |
| Registered electors | | 88,088 | | |
| Labour hold | | Swing | +10.3 | |

=== 2019 general election, Holborn and St Pancras ===
General election 2019: Holborn and St Pancras
| Party | Candidate | Votes | % | ±% |
|---|---|---|---|---|
| Labour | Keir Starmer | 36,641 | 64.5 | −5.6 |
| Conservative | Alexandra Hayward | 8,878 | 15.6 | −2.8 |
| Liberal Democrats | Matthew Kirk | 7,314 | 12.9 | +6.1 |
| Green | Kirsten De Keyser | 2,746 | 4.8 | +1.4 |
| Brexit Party | Hector Birchwood | 1,032 | 1.8 | N/A |
| UKIP | Mohammad Bhatti | 138 | 0.2 | −1.0 |
| Socialist Equality | Thomas Scripps | 37 | 0.1 | N/A |
| Majority | | 27,763 | 48.9 | −2.8 |
| Turnout | | 56,786 | 65.1 | −1.9 |
| Registered electors | | 87,236 | | |
| Labour hold | | Swing | −1.4 | |

=== 2024 general election, Holborn and St Pancras ===
General election 2024: Holborn and St Pancras
| Party | Candidate | Votes | % | ±% |
|---|---|---|---|---|
| Labour | Keir Starmer | 18,884 | 48.9 | −17.4 |
| Independent | Andrew Feinstein | 7,312 | 18.9 | N/A |
| Green | David Stansell | 4,030 | 10.4 | +6.4 |
| Conservative | Mehreen Malik | 2,776 | 7.2 | −8.0 |
| Reform | David Roberts | 2,371 | 6.1 | +4.2 |
| Liberal Democrats | Charlie Clinton | 2,236 | 5.8 | −6.5 |
| Independent | Wais Islam | 636 | 1.6 | N/A |
| Monster Raving Loony | Nick the Incredible Flying Brick | 162 | 0.4 | N/A |
| UKIP | John Poynton | 75 | 0.2 | −0.1 |
| Socialist Equality | Tom Scripps | 61 | 0.2 | +0.1 |
| Independent | Senthil Kumar | 40 | 0.1 | N/A |
| No description | Bobby Smith | 19 | 0.0 | N/A |
| Majority | | 11,572 | 30.0 | −21.1 |
| Turnout | | 38,602 | 54.1 | −5.0 |
| Registered electors | | 71,300 | | |
| Labour hold | | Swing | | |

== 2020 Labour Party leadership election ==
Keir Starmer won the Labour leadership election in the first round of voting.

Full result
| Candidate | Party members | | Registered supporters | | Affiliated supporters | | Total | |
| Candidate | Votes | % | Votes | % | Votes | % | Votes | % |
|---|---|---|---|---|---|---|---|---|
| Keir Starmer | 225,135 | 56.1% | 10,228 | 76.6% | 40,417 | 53.1% | 275,780 | 56.2% |
| Rebecca Long-Bailey | 117,598 | 29.3% | 650 | 5.0% | 16,970 | 22.3% | 135,218 | 27.6% |
| Lisa Nandy | 58,788 | 14.6% | 2,128 | 17.4% | 18,681 | 24.6% | 79,597 | 16.2% |

Turnout was 62.6 per cent. There were 490,731 returned ballots, from a total of 784,181 eligible voters. 136 ballot papers were spoiled.

=== Endorsements ===
- Andrew Adonis, Labour peer
- Gordon Brown, former Prime Minister
- Jenny Chapman, former MP for Darlington
- Vernon Coaker, former MP for Gedling and former minister
- Nic Dakin, former MP for Scunthorpe
- Alf Dubs, Labour peer and former MP for Battersea
- Evening Standard, politically conservative London newspaper and online news service
- David Hanson, former MP for Delyn and former minister
- Lesley Laird, former Deputy Leader of Scottish Labour and former MP for Kirkcaldy and Cowdenbeath
- Emma Reynolds, former MP for Wolverhampton North East
- Carwyn Jones, former First Minister of Wales
- Sadiq Khan, Mayor of London
- Doreen Lawrence, Labour peer, campaigner and mother of Stephen Lawrence
- Paul Mason, journalist and broadcaster (second choice after his support for Clive Lewis)
- Jeremy Miles, Counsel General for Wales and AM for Neath
- Sally Phillips, actress
- Jack Sargeant, AM for Alyn and Deeside
- Ricky Tomlinson, actor

== 2024 United Kingdom general election ==
| Affiliate | Leader | MPs | | Aggregate votes | |
| Affiliate | Leader | | Of total | | Of total |
|---|---|---|---|---|---|
| Labour Party | Keir Starmer | 411 (Note: Includes 43 MPs sponsored by the Co-operative Party, who are designated Labour and Co-operative.) | 63.2% | 9,708,716 | 33.7% |
| Conservative Party | Rishi Sunak | 121 | 18.6% | 6,828,925 | 23.7% |
| Liberal Democrats | Ed Davey | 72 | 11.1% | 3,519,143 | 12.2% |
| Scottish National Party | John Swinney | 9 | 1.4% | 724,758 | 2.5% |
| Sinn Féin | Mary Lou McDonald | 7 | 1.1% | 210,891 | 0.7% |
| Independent | —N/a | 6 | 0.9% | 564,243 | 2.0% |
| Reform UK | Nigel Farage | 5 | 0.8% | 4,117,610 | 14.3% |
| Democratic Unionist Party | Gavin Robinson | 5 | 0.8% | 172,058 | 0.6% |
| Green Party of England and Wales | Carla Denyer; Adrian Ramsay | 4 | 0.6% | 1,841,888 | 6.4% |
| Plaid Cymru | Rhun ap Iorwerth | 4 | 0.6% | 194,811 | 0.7% |
| Social Democratic and Labour Party | Colum Eastwood | 2 | 0.3% | 86,861 | 0.3% |
| Alliance Party of Northern Ireland | Naomi Long | 1 | 0.2% | 117,191 | 0.4% |
| Ulster Unionist Party | Doug Beattie | 1 | 0.2% | 94,779 | 0.3% |
| Traditional Unionist Voice | Jim Allister | 1 | 0.2% | 48,685 | 0.2% |
| Speaker | Lindsay Hoyle | 1 | 0.2% | 25,238 | 0.1% |
