= Winterton Community Academy =

Location
- Newport Drive; Winterton, Lincolnshire, DN15 9QD; England; 53.65909°N 0.59771°W

Information
- Type: Academy
- Department for Education URN: 138831 Tables
- Ofsted: Reports
- Headteacher: Kevin Rowlands
- Gender: Coeducational
- Age: 11 to 16
- Website: http://www.wintertonca.com/

Winterton Community Academy (formerly Winterton Comprehensive School) is a coeducational secondary school with academy status, located in Winterton, North Lincolnshire, England.

== Admissions ==
Winterton Community Academy offers GCSEs and BTECs as programmes of study for pupils.

== History ==
=== Secondary modern ===
The school began as Winterton Secondary Modern School. Grammar school for Winterton was Scunthorpe Grammar School (now St Lawrence Academy, Scunthorpe, and previously High Ridge School).

=== Comprehensive ===
It became comprehensive with the rest of Scunthorpe in 1968. The new comprehensive was for Alkborough, Appleby, Roxby-cum-Risby, West Halton, Whitton, and Winteringham. After further enlargement it would be for 300 more children, to include Flixborough and Burton-upon-Stather. It cost £147,309 for 450 to 750 places.

Phase 1 was built in 1972. Mr A Ecclestone was headteacher from 1961 to 1978, who had attended St Catharine's College, Cambridge.

Previously a community school administered by North Lincolnshire Council, Winterton Comprehensive School converted to academy status on 1 October 2012 and was renamed Winterton Community Academy.

== Notable former pupils ==
=== Winterton Secondary Modern School ===
- Liz Redfern, Baroness Redfern, Conservative Leader from 2006–07 and 2011-17 of North Lincolnshire Council
- Matt Houlbrook, Author and Professor of Cultural History at Birmingham University 2017-
- Scott Lindsey, former professional footballer and Manager of League 2 team Crawley Town 2023-
