= Liz Redfern, Baroness Redfern =

British politician

The Right Honourable The Baroness Redfern
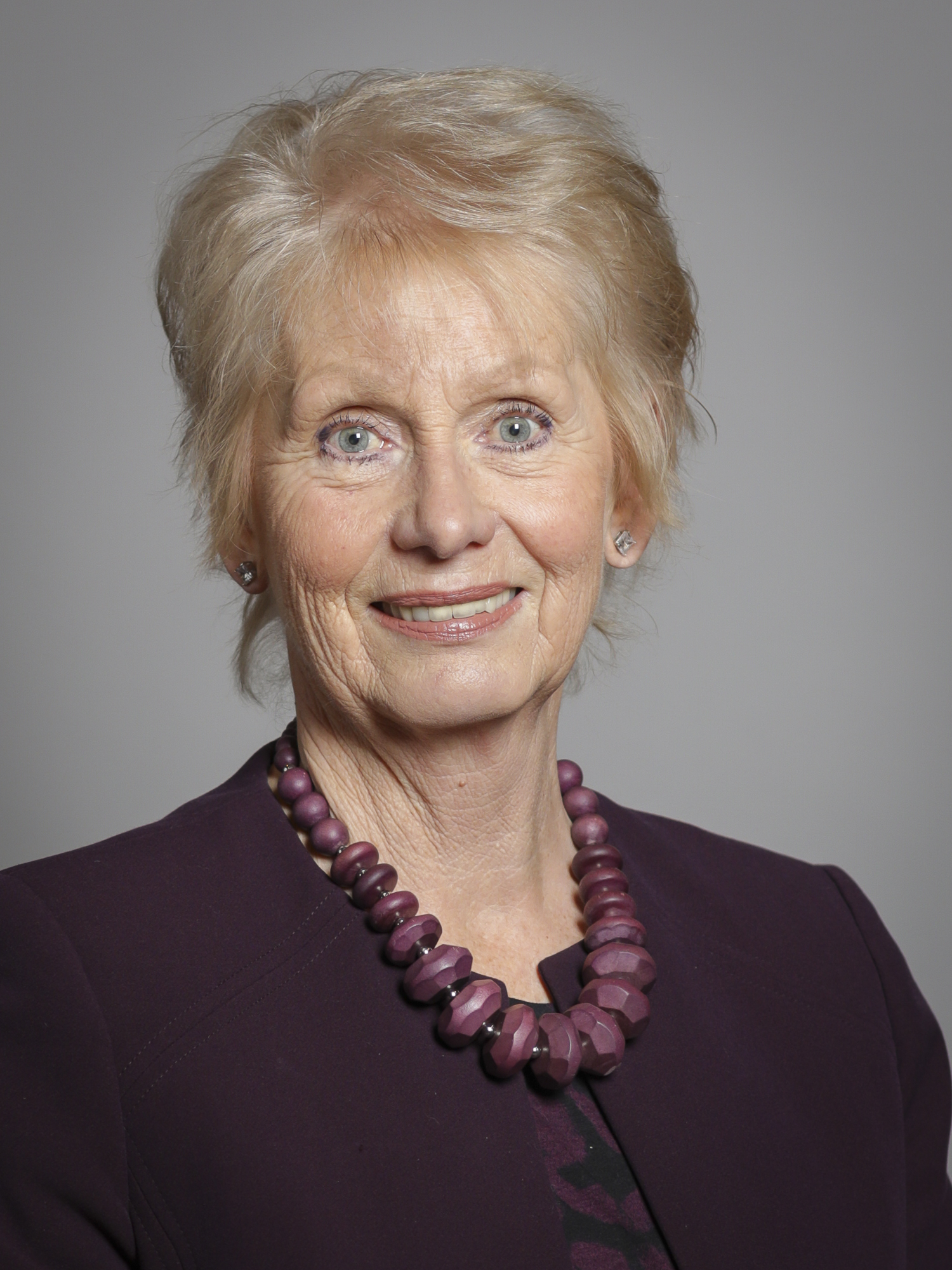

Member of the House of Lords
- Lord Temporal
- Life peerage 7 October 2015

Personal details
- Born: 25 September 1947 (age 79)

Elizabeth Marie "Liz" Redfern, Baroness Redfern (born 25 September 1947) is a British Conservative member of the House of Lords until 25 September 2026.

== Early life ==
She was born in Winterton as Elizabeth Waud. She attended Winterton Secondary Modern School - a coeducational secondary school, located in Winterton, North Lincolnshire.

== Career ==
Composition of the council when she became Leader in 2011

She became a Conservative councillor on North Lincolnshire Council, at its creation in 1996. She represented the Axholme Central ward until May 2019.

The leader of North Lincolnshire Council until 15 January 2017, she was created a life peer on 7 October 2015, taking the title Baroness Redfern, of the Isle of Axholme in the County of Lincolnshire.

Civic offices
| Preceded by Mark Kirk | Leader of North Lincolnshire Council; May 2011 – January 2017 | Succeeded by Rob Waltham |
| Preceded by | Leader of North Lincolnshire Council; 2006 – 2007 | Succeeded by Mark Kirk |
| Preceded by | Deputy Leader of North Lincolnshire Council; 2003 – 2006 | Succeeded by |
