= 2023 North Lincolnshire Council election =

2023 English local election

- 4 May 2023

All 43 seats to North Lincolnshire Council 22 seats needed for a majority

	First party	Second party	Third party
Leader	Robert Waltham MBE	Len Foster	n/a
Party	Conservative	Labour	Independent
Leader's seat	Brigg and Wolds	Brumby
Last election	27	16	0
Seats before	28	14	1
Seats won	27	16	0
Seat change	▼1	▲2	▼1
- Map of the results
Leader before election
Robert Waltham
Conservative
Leader after election
Robert Waltham
Conservative

The 2023 North Lincolnshire Council election took place on 4 May 2023 to elect all 43 members of North Lincolnshire Council in Lincolnshire, England. This was at the same time as other local elections across England.

The Conservatives retained their majority on the council.

== Background ==
Following the 2019 election the council had comprised 27 Conservative and 16 Labour councillors. In October 2019 the former leader of the Labour group, Mark Kirk, left the party and sat as an independent. There were then three by-elections in May 2021, which saw the Conservatives gain one extra seat from Labour. The 2023 election saw the parties return to the same number of seats they had had in 2019.

Party	After 2019 election	Before 2023 election	2023 results
Conservative	27	28	27
Labour	16	14	16
Independent	0	1	0

== Ward results ==
The results in each ward:

=== Ashby Central ===
Following boundary changes across North Lincolnshire, this was a new ward for these elections. Therefore, no swing is provided.

Ashby Central
Party	Candidate	Votes	%	±%
Labour	Michael Grant	784	60.26	
Labour	Andrea Davison	778	59.80	
Conservative	James Knight	521	40.05	
Conservative	Kara Broughton	519	39.89	
Turnout		1301	22.95	

=== Ashby Lakeside ===
Following boundary changes across North Lincolnshire, this was a new ward for these elections. Therefore, no swing is provided.

*Ashley Sykes was suspended by the Conservative Party during the election campaign, however, remained on the ballot paper as a candidate for the 'Local Conservatives' due to the timing of the suspension.

Ashby Lakeside
Party	Candidate	Votes	%	±%
Labour	Max Bell	687	64.81	
Labour	Judith Matthews	677	63.87	
Conservative	Joanne Saunby	416	39.24	
Conservative	Ashley Sykes*	340	32.08	
Turnout		1060	20.25	

=== Axholme Central ===
Axholme Central
Party	Candidate	Votes	%	±%
Conservative	Tim Mitchell	1,265	73.93	
Conservative	David Robinson	1,141	66.69	
Labour	Pamela Allen	574	33.55	
Labour	Annie Jones	442	25.83	
Turnout		1711	29.94	
Conservative hold				
Conservative hold				

=== Axholme North ===
Axholme North
Party	Candidate	Votes	%	±%
Conservative	Julie Reed	1,207	62.72	
Conservative	John Briggs	1,187	61.68	
Labour	Lara Chaplin	663	34.45	
Labour	Simon O'Rourke	589	30.60	
Green	Nadine Bones	203	10.55	
Turnout		1925	31.56	
Conservative hold				
Conservative hold				

=== Axholme South ===
Axholme South
Party	Candidate	Votes	%	±%
Conservative	David Rose	1,364	77.90	
Conservative	Judy Kennedy	1,340	76.53	
Labour	Lisa Southern	400	22.84	
Labour	Nicholas Parkinson	398	22.73	
Turnout		1751	32.04	
Conservative hold				
Conservative hold				

=== Barton ===
Barton
Party	Candidate	Votes	%	±%
Conservative	Keith Vickers	1,568	58.58	
Conservative	Paul Vickers	1,252	46.77	
Conservative	Chris Patterson	1,101	41.13	
Green	Neil Jacques	1037	38.74	
Green	Carol Thornton	820	30.64	
Green	Amie Watson	709	26.49	
Labour	Neil Turner	558	20.85	
Labour	Susan Turner	530	19.80	
Labour	Dina Tchernych	455	17.00	
Turnout		2677	30.86	
Conservative hold				
Conservative hold				
Conservative hold				

=== Bottesford ===
Bottesford
Party	Candidate	Votes	%	±%
Conservative	Margaret Armiger	1,582	54.01	
Conservative	Janet Longcake	1,535	52.41	
Conservative	John Davison	1,520	51.89	
Labour	Glyn Williams	1348	46.02	
Labour	Paul Shearer	1280	43.7	
Labour	Sallyanne Humphreys	1232	42.06	
Green	Sue Wilsea	171	5.84	
Heritage	Scott Curtis	119	4.06	
Turnout		2929	35.33	
Conservative hold				
Conservative hold				
Conservative hold				

=== Brigg & Wolds ===
This ward was subject to boundary changes at this election. Therefore, no swing is provided.

Brigg & Wolds
Party	Candidate	Votes	%	±%
Conservative	Rob Waltham	2,181	73.55	
Conservative	Carl Sherwood	2,108	71.09	
Conservative	Nigel Sherwood	2,062	69.54	
Labour	Gordon Walker	769	25.93	
Labour	Lawrence Rayner	654	22.05	
Labour	Maureen Whittaker-Clark	626	21.11	
Green	Jenny Haynes	496	16.73	
Turnout		2965	33.39	
Conservative hold				
Conservative hold				
Conservative hold				

=== Broughton & Scawby ===
Following boundary changes across North Lincolnshire, this was a new ward for these elections. Therefore, no swing is provided.

The below is the legally-declared result for this election in this ward. However, 864 cast postal votes for this ward were placed in a wheelie bin and mistakenly not counted towards the legally-declared result. The legally-declared turnout figure includes the aforementioned "missing" postal votes.

Broughton & Scawby
Party	Candidate	Votes	%	±%
Conservative	Carol Ross	528	56.17	
Conservative	Janet Lee	525	55.85	
Labour	Michael Campion	367	39.04	
Labour	Catherine Whittingham	355	37.77	
Green	Mark Bannister	105	11.17	
Turnout		940	30.40	
Conservative hold				
Conservative hold				

=== Brumby ===
Brumby
Party	Candidate	Votes	%	±%
Labour	Leonard Foster	993	75.34	
Labour	Susan Armitage	920	69.80	
Labour	Stephen Swift	909	68.97	
Conservative	Louise Mikkonen	397	30.12	
Conservative	Sandra Sherwood	369	28.00	
Conservative	Anne Hannigan	366	27.77	
Turnout		1318	17.61	
Labour hold				
Labour hold				
Labour hold				

=== Burringham and Gunness ===
Burringham and Gunness
Party	Candidate	Votes	%	±%
Conservative	Josh Walshe	575	50.71	
Labour	Daniel Hart	336	29.63	
Independent	Dave Oldfield	223	19.67	
Turnout		1134	38.48	
Conservative hold				

=== Burton Upon Stather & Winterton ===
This ward was subject to boundary changes at this election. Therefore, no swing is provided.

Burton Upon Stather & Winterton
Party	Candidate	Votes	%	±%
Conservative	Ralph Ogg	2,037	61.41	
Conservative	Elaine Marper	1,975	59.55	
Conservative	Helen Rowson	1,974	59.52	
Labour	Sarah Jarvis	1305	39.35	
Labour	Trevor Davey	1200	36.18	
Labour	William Brown	1158	34.91	
Green	Jo Baker	301	9.08	
Turnout		3317	37.03	
Conservative hold				
Conservative hold				
Conservative hold				

=== Crosby & Park ===
*Mark Kirk was elected as a Labour Councillor in 2019, but stood as an independent candidate at this election.

Crosby & Park
Party	Candidate	Votes	%	±%
Labour	Christine O'Sullivan	1,147	80.98	
Labour	Nasser Ahmed	999	70.53	
Labour	Helen Yates	965	68.13	
Independent	Mark Kirk*	524	37.00	
Independent	Liz Rahman	327	23.09	
Independent	Mohammed Choudhury	287	20.26	
Turnout		1417	18.91	
Labour hold				
Labour hold				
Labour hold				

=== Ferry ===
Ferry
Party	Candidate	Votes	%	±%
Conservative	Peter Clark	1,479	64.66	
Conservative	Richard Hannigan	1,362	59.55	
Conservative	David Wells	1,243	54.34	
Labour	Paul Wilkinson	824	36.02	
Labour	Peter Swann	821	35.89	
Labour	Stephen Rayner	611	26.71	
Green	Sue Stephenson	522	22.82	
Turnout		2287	27.98	
Conservative hold				
Conservative hold				
Conservative hold				

=== Frodingham ===
Frodingham
Party	Candidate	Votes	%	±%
Labour	Anthony Ellerby	742	78.69	
Labour	Darryl Southern	669	70.94	
Conservative	Angela Foster	259	27.46	
Conservative	Mary Allen	216	22.91	
Turnout		943	17.68	
Labour hold				
Labour hold				

=== Kingsway & Lincoln Gardens ===
This ward was subject to boundary changes at this election. Therefore, no swing is provided.

Kingsway & Lincoln Gardens
Party	Candidate	Votes	%	±%
Labour	Anthony Gosling	1,100	67.40	
Labour	Helen Rayner	1,055	64.64	
Conservative	Pat Mewis	598	36.64	
Conservative	Jordan Marper	511	31.31	
Turnout		1632	28.16	

=== Messingham ===
Following boundary changes across North Lincolnshire, this was a new ward for these elections. Therefore, no swing is provided.

Messingham
Party	Candidate	Votes	%	±%
Conservative	Neil Poole	715	61.37	
Labour	Simon Shaw	450	38.62	
Turnout		1165	30.77	

=== Ridge ===
This ward was subject to boundary changes at this election. Therefore, no swing is provided.

Ridge
Party	Candidate	Votes	%	±%
Conservative	David Garritt	817	55.79	
Conservative	Trevor Foster	748	51.08	
Labour	Margaret Davies	558	38.10	
Labour	Geoffrey Cossey	496	33.87	
Green	Jacqui Stirling	198	13.52	
UKIP	Andy Taliss	112	7.65	
Turnout		1465	31.41	

=== Town ===
Town
Party	Candidate	Votes	%	±%
Labour	Lorraine Yeadon	870	74.84	
Labour	Mashook Ali	844	72.60	
Conservative	Jamal Ahmed	323	27.78	
Conservative	Choudhury Anjum	288	24.77	
Turnout		1163	21.76	
Labour hold				
Labour hold				

== Changes 2023-2027 ==
=== By-elections ===
==== Axholme North ====
Axholme North: 6 June 2024
Party	Candidate	Votes	%	±%
Conservative	Ian Bint	901	66.9	+8.7
Labour	Lara Chaplin	378	28.1	–3.9
Liberal Democrats	Alan Kelly	67	5.0	N/A
Majority		523	38.8	N/A
Turnout		1,346		
Conservative hold		Swing	▲6.3	

==== Brumby ====
Brumby: 6 June 2024
Party	Candidate	Votes	%	±%
Labour	Daniel Hart	616	61.5	–9.9
Conservative	Alan Cook	294	29.3	+0.7
Green	Peter Dennington	49	4.9	N/A
Liberal Democrats	Robin Abram	43	4.3	N/A
Majority		322	32.2	N/A
Turnout		1,002		
Labour hold		Swing	▼5.3	

==== Brumby ====
Brumby: 10 June 2024
Party	Candidate	Votes	%	±%
Labour	Daniel Hart	616	61.5	–9.9
Conservative	Alan Cook	294	29.3	+0.7
Green	Peter Dennington	49	4.9	N/A
Liberal Democrats	Robin Abram	43	4.3	N/A
Majority		322	32.2	N/A
Turnout		1,002		
Labour hold		Swing	▼5.3	
