= 2011 North Lincolnshire Council election =

2011 UK local government election

Map of results of 2011 election

The 2011 North Lincolnshire Council election took place as part of English local elections on 5 May 2011, with all 43 members up for election. Defending a majority of one, the Labour Party lost control of the council to the Conservatives, who won with a majority of three seats in the only Conservative council gain from Labour in the country.

== Election result ==
Results after 2007 election
Party	Councillors
Labour	22
Conservative	18
Liberal Democrats	1
Independent	2
Total	43

North Lincolnshire Council Election, 2011
Party	Seats	Gains	Losses	Net gain/loss	Seats %	Votes %	Votes	+/−
Conservative	23	6	1	+5	53.48	48.73	55,790	
Labour	20	1	3	-2	46.51	43.03	49,270	
Other parties	0	0	3	-3	0.00	8.23	9,426	

The changes above is the difference from the previous full council election, although after a mid-term defection from the Liberal Democrats to the Conservatives, the Liberal Democrats were not defending any seats.

== Ward results ==
=== Ashby ===
Ashby elected three members, with Labour winning all three seats. John Collinson, Andrea Davison and Michael Grant were elected.

Ashby
Party	Candidate	Votes	%	±%
Labour	John Collinson	1,578	24.38	
Labour	Andrea Davison	1,521	23.5	
Labour	Michael Grant	1,506	23.26	
Conservative	Sue England	680	10.5	
Conservative	Gary Day	671	10.36	
Conservative	Gio Loperfido	516	7.97	
Turnout		2,674	30.8%	

=== Axholme Central ===
Axholme Central elected two members, Conservative David Robinson and leader of the Conservative group Liz Redfern.

Axholme Central
Party	Candidate	Votes	%	±%
Conservative	Liz Redfern	1,664	38.34	
Conservative	David Robinson	1,253	28.87	
Independent	Don Stewart	569	13.11	
Labour	John O'Connor	448	10.32	
Labour	Lorraine Yeadon	406	9.35	
Turnout		2,476	44.3%	

=== Axholme North ===
Axholme North elected two members, Conservative John Briggs and Labour candidate Trevor Barker.

Axholme North
Party	Candidate	Votes	%	±%
Conservative	John Briggs	1,330	25.86	
Labour	Trevor Barker	1,194	23.21	
Conservative	Andrew Singleton	1,093	21.25	
Labour	Paul McCartan	927	18.02	
Independent	Mel Bailey	275	5.34	
Independent	Harold Osborne	232	4.51	
Independent	David Patterson	92	1.78	
Turnout		2,809	44%	

=== Axholme South ===
Axholme South elected two members, Conservatives Ron Allcock and William Eckhardt.

Axholme South
Party	Candidate	Votes	%	±%
Conservative	Ron Allcock	1,418	32.99	
Conservative	William Eckhardt	1,353	31.47	
Liberal Democrats	Don Lange	847	19.7	
Labour	Haque Nawaz Kataria	343	7.98	
Labour	Anamul Hoque	337	7.84	
Turnout		2,757	48.7%	

=== Barton ===
The Barton ward elected three members, Conservatives Paul Vickers, Keith Vickers and Jonathan Evison.

Barton
Party	Candidate	Votes	%	±%
Conservative	Paul Vickers	1,602	18.26	
Conservative	Keith Vickers	1,474	16.8	
Conservative	Jonathan Evison	1,238	14.11	
Labour	Caroline Sansam	995	11.34	
Labour	Michael William Stuart Osgerby	913	10.4	
Labour	Emma Donaldson	913	10.4	
Independent	Montague John Martin	630	7.18	
Green	Jan Clark	554	6.31	
Independent	Paul Shearer	453	5.16	
Turnout		3,420	41.5	

=== Bottesford ===
Bottesford elected three members, Conservative candidate Jean Bromby and Labour candidates Stephen Swift and David Whiteley.

Bottesford
Party	Candidate	Votes	%	±%
Conservative	Jean Bromby	1,908	18.41	
Labour	Stephen Swift	1,819	17.55	
Labour	David Whiteley	1,680	16.21	
Labour	Glyn Williams	1,640	15.83	
Conservative	Yvonne Aubrey	1,632	15.75	
Conservative	Louise Mikkonen	1,252	12.08	
UKIP	Luke Standland	428	4.13	
Turnout		4,050	44.5	

=== Brigg and Wolds ===
The Brigg and Wolds ward elected three members, Conservatives Carl Sherwood, Nigel Sherwood and Rob Waltham.

Brigg and Wolds
Party	Candidate	Votes	%	±%
Conservative	Nigel Sherwood	2,349	22.07	
Conservative	Carl Sherwood	2,299	21.6	
Conservative	Rob Waltham	1,897	17.82	
Labour	Michael Stuart Champion	1,032	9.69	
Independent	James Truepenny	755	7.09	
Labour	Arshad Jawaid	656	6.16	
Labour	Latif Miah	561	5.27	
Independent	John Charles Berry	556	5.22	
Independent	Mick Wilson	536	5.03	
Turnout		3,978	43.8	

=== Broughton and Appleby ===
Broughton and Appleby elected two members, Conservatives Arthur Bunyan and Ivan Glover.

Broughton and Appleby
Party	Candidate	Votes	%	±%
Conservative	Ivan Glover	1,269	30.71	
Conservative	Arthur Bunyan	1,262	30.54	
Labour	Bernard Grainger	904	21.88	
Labour	Paul Redfern	696	16.84	
Turnout		2,267	42.7%	

=== Brumby ===
Brumby elected three members, with Labour winning all three seats. Len Foster, Pauline Carlile and Sue Armitage were elected.

Brumby
Party	Candidate	Votes	%	±%
Labour	Len Foster	1,418	25.24	
Labour	Pauline Carlile	1,339	23.83	
Labour	Sue Armitage	1,283	22.84	
Conservative	Barbara Allcock	541	9.63	
Conservative	Jennie Eckhardt	439	7.81	
Conservative	Richard Hutchings	417	7.42	
Independent	Adrian Holmes	180	3.2	
Turnout		2,306	28.2%	

=== Burringham and Gunness ===
Burringham and Gunness elected just a single member, Labour candidate Dave Oldfield.

Burringham and Gunness
Party	Candidate	Votes	%	±%
Labour	Dave Oldfield	715	50.03	
Conservative	Graham Wagstaffe	714	49.96	
Turnout		1,441	47.1%	

=== Burton upon Stather and Winterton ===
Burringham and Stather and Winterton elected three members, Conservative candidates Elaine Marper, Ralph Ogg and Helen Rowson.

Burton upon Stather and Winterton
Party	Candidate	Votes	%	±%
Conservative	Ralph Ogg	2,055	18.0	
Conservative	Elaine Marper	1,994	17.47	
Conservative	Helen Rowson	1,860	16.3	
Labour	Matthew Buckley	1,859	16.29	
Labour	Lucinda Hopkins	1,830	16.03	
Labour	Bernard Regan	1,813	15.88	
Turnout		4,281	48.2%	

=== Crosby and Park ===
The Crosby and Park ward elected three members, Labour candidates Jawaid Ishaq, Mark Kirk and Christine O'Sullivan.

Crosby and Park
Party	Candidate	Votes	%	±%
Labour	Mark Kirk	1,686	24.49	
Labour	Christine O'Sullivan	1,520	22.08	
Labour	Jawaid Ishaq	1,380	20.05	
Conservative	Mohammed Elias Javed	790	11.47	
Conservative	Dariusz Piotr Wilkowski	770	11.18	
Conservative	Roqueb Uddin Ahmed	736	10.69	
Turnout		2,906	30.9%	
