= Holly Mumby-Croft =

British Conservative politician

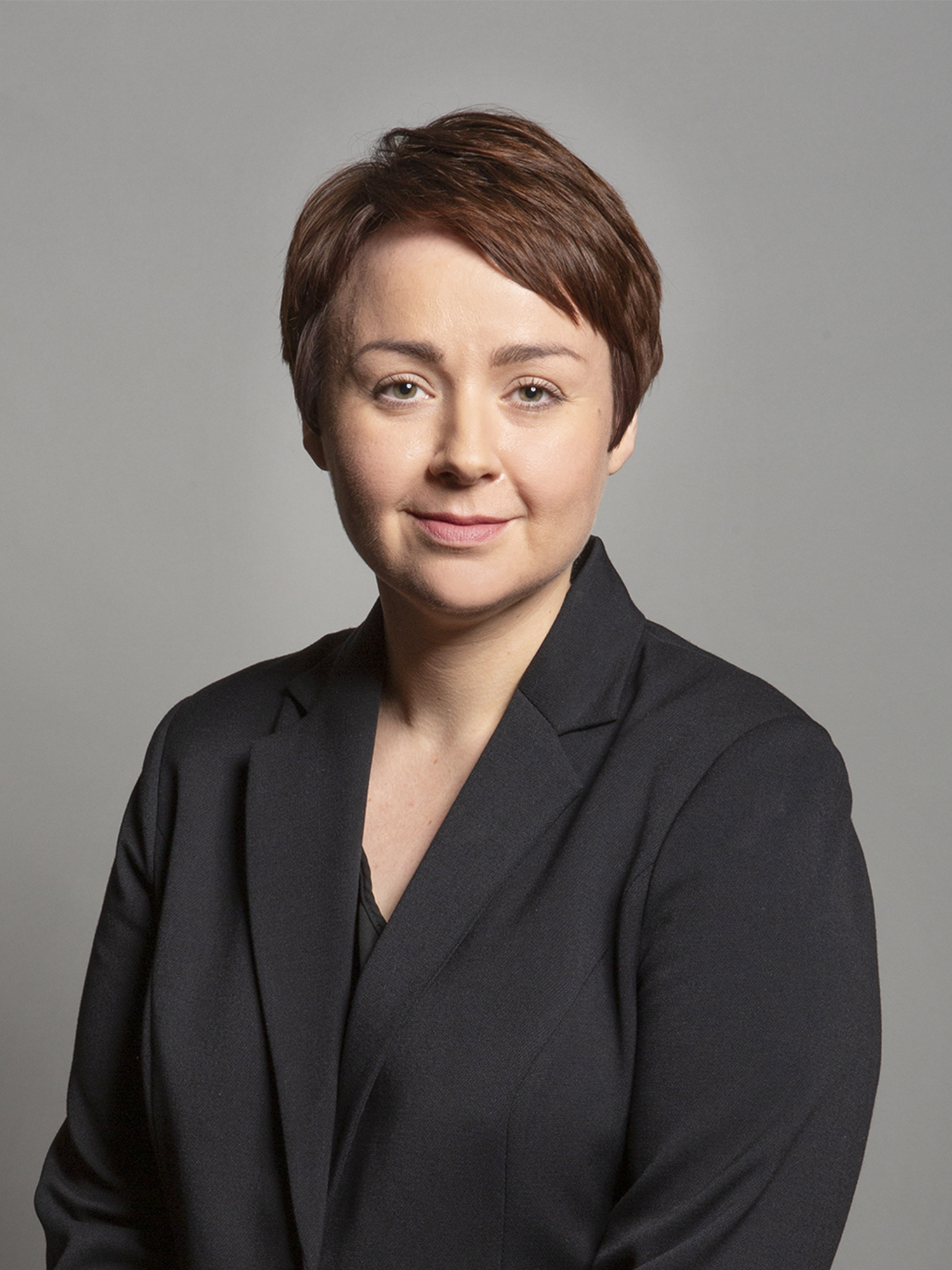
- Official portrait, 2019

Member of Parliament for Scunthorpe
- In office 12 December 2019 – 30 May 2024
- Preceded by: Nic Dakin
- Succeeded by: Nic Dakin

Personal details
- Born: July 1985 (age 41) Scunthorpe, Lincolnshire, England
- Party: Conservative
- Education: Sir John Nelthorpe School
- Alma mater: Lincoln University

Holly Mumby-Croft (born July 1985) is a British Conservative Party politician, who served as the Member of Parliament (MP) for Scunthorpe from 2019 to 2024.

== Early life ==
Mumby-Croft was born in Scunthorpe. She attended Sir John Nelthorpe School in Brigg and Brigg Sixth-Form College, then read English and History at the University of Lincoln.

== Political career ==
Prior to her election as an MP, Mumby-Croft was elected as a councillor for the Broughton and Appleby ward on North Lincolnshire Council in 2015, and was re-elected in May 2019 but stood down upon being elected to Parliament.

Mumby-Croft stood in Scunthorpe at the 2017 general election, and came second. She stood again at the 2019 general election, and defeated the incumbent Labour MP Nic Dakin, winning with a 17.1% majority. This represented a 12.8% swing from Labour to Conservative.

In February 2020, Mumby-Croft praised plans to build a multi-million pound national flood training centre in Scunthorpe. She made her maiden speech on 6 March 2020, and talked about the town's steel industry. She also made a commitment to increased school funding and the upgrading of Scunthorpe General Hospital.

In October 2020, Mumby-Croft was one of five Conservative MPs who broke the whip to vote for a Labour opposition day motion to extend the provision of free school meals during school holidays until Easter 2021.

Mumby-Croft lost her seat in the 2024 general election to Labour MP Nic Dakin, who regained his seat from her after losing to her in 2019.

== Electoral history ==
=== 2024 general election ===
General election 2024: Scunthorpe
Party	Candidate	Votes	%	±%
Labour	Nic Dakin	15,484	39.7	+4.8
Conservative	Holly Mumby-Croft	11,942	30.6	−25.7
Reform	Darren Haley	8,163	20.9	+16.6
Green	Nick Cox	1,218	3.1	+1.3
Independent	Abdul R Butt	1,202	3.1	N/A
Liberal Democrats	Cahal Burke	942	2.4	−0.2
Heritage	Scott Curtis	100	0.3	N/A
Majority		3,542	9.1	N/A
Turnout		39,051	52.6	−11.0
Registered electors		74,263		
Labour gain from Conservative		Swing	▲15.3	

=== 2019 general election ===
General election 2019: Scunthorpe
Party	Candidate	Votes	%	±%
Conservative	Holly Mumby-Croft	20,306	53.8	+10.3
Labour	Nic Dakin	13,855	36.7	−15.3
Brexit Party	Jerry Gorman	2,044	5.4	+5.4
Liberal Democrats	Ryk Downes	875	2.3	+0.9
Green	Peter Dennington	670	1.8	+1.8
Majority		6,451	17.1	N/A
Turnout		37,750	60.9	−4.4
Conservative gain from Labour		Swing	+12.8	

=== 2017 general election ===
General election 2017: Scunthorpe
Party	Candidate	Votes	%	±%
Labour	Nic Dakin	20,916	52.0	+10.3
Conservative	Holly Mumby-Croft	17,485	43.5	+10.3
UKIP	Andy Talliss	1,247	3.1	−14.0
Liberal Democrats	Ryk Downes	554	1.4	−0.7
Majority		3,431	8.5	0.0
Turnout		40,202	65.3	+7.6
Labour hold		Swing	+0.0	

Parliament of the United Kingdom
Preceded by Nic Dakin	Member of Parliament for Scunthorpe; 2019–2024	Succeeded by Nic Dakin
