= 2015 North Lincolnshire Council election =

Local election in England

- 7 May 2015

All 43 seats to North Lincolnshire Council 22 seats needed for a majority
| | First party | Second party |
|---|---|---|
| Party | Conservative | Labour |
| Last election | 23 seats | 20 seats |
| Seats won | 26 seats | 17 seats |
| Seat change | ▲3 | ▼3 |
- Map of the results of the election. Colours denote the winning party, as shown in the main table of results.
Party before election
Conservative
Elected Party
Conservative

The 2015 North Lincolnshire Council election took place on 7 May 2015 to elect members of the North Lincolnshire Council in England. It was held on the same day as other local elections.

The election resulted in the Conservative Party retaining control of the council.
