= 2019 North Lincolnshire Council election =

2019 UK local government election

- 2 May 2019

All 43 seats to North Lincolnshire Council 22 seats needed for a majority
	First party	Second party
Leader	Robert Waltham	Len Foster
Party	Conservative	Labour
Leader's seat	Brigg and Wolds	Brumby
Last election	26 seats	17 seats
Seats won	27 seats	16 seats
Seat change	▲1	▼1
- Map of the results of the election. Colours denote the winning party, as shown in the main table of results.
Party before election
Conservative
Elected Party
Conservative

The 2019 North Lincolnshire Council election took place on 2 May 2019 to elect all 43 members of North Lincolnshire Council in England. This was on the same day as other local elections.

The election resulted in the Conservative Party retaining control of the council.

== Result summary ==
2019 North Lincolnshire Council election
Party	Seats	Gains	Losses	Net gain/loss	Seats %	Votes %	Votes	+/−
Conservative	27	1	0	▲1		53.3	51,217	
Labour	16	0	1	▼1		36.9	35,503	
Green	0	0	0	Steady		5.4	5,166	
Independent	0	0	0	Steady		2.1	1,999	
UKIP	0	0	0	Steady		1.0	945	
Liberal Democrats	0	0	0	Steady		0.9	893	
For Britain	0	0	0	Steady		0.4	364	

== Ward results ==
=== Ashby ===
Ashby
Party	Candidate	Votes	%	±%
Labour	John Collinson	1,262	61.7	
Labour	Mick Grant	1,238	60.5	
Labour	Andrea Davison	1,226	60.0	
Conservative	Janet Longcake	585	28.6	
Conservative	Angela Foster	570	27.9	
Conservative	Sandra Sherwood	493	24.1	
Turnout		2,045		
Labour hold				
Labour hold				
Labour hold				

=== Axholme Central ===
Axholme Central
Party	Candidate	Votes	%	±%
Conservative	David Robinson	1,629	76.8	
Conservative	Tim Mitchell	1,588	74.8	
Independent	Gary Johnson	756	35.6	
Labour	Hannah Webster	322	15.2	
Green	Christopher Spencer	309	14.6	
Labour	Brian Parkinson	184	8.7	
Turnout		2,122		
Conservative hold				
Conservative hold				

=== Axholme North ===
Axholme North
Party	Candidate	Votes	%	±%
Conservative	John Briggs	1,347	56.0	
Conservative	Julie Reed	1,316	54.7	
Labour	Robbie Pender	590	24.5	
UKIP	Iain Booth	491	20.4	
Labour	Justine Green	392	16.3	
Green	Sue Wilsea	245	10.2	
Turnout		2,407		
Conservative hold				
Conservative hold				

=== Axholme South ===
Axholme South
Party	Candidate	Votes	%	±%
Conservative	Ron Allcock	1,447	70.6	
Conservative	David Rose	1,406	68.6	
Green	Michelle Stirling	346	16.9	
Labour	Paula Brocklesby	326	15.9	
Labour	Neil Carbutt	256	12.5	
Turnout		2,051		
Conservative hold				
Conservative hold				

=== Barton ===
Barton
Party	Candidate	Votes	%	±%
Conservative	Paul Vickers	1,494	50.7	
Conservative	Keith Vickers	1,286	43.6	
Conservative	Jonathan Evison	1,264	42.9	
Green	Neil Jacques	767	26.0	
Green	Carol Thornton	662	22.5	
Labour	Paul Shearer	560	19.0	
Green	Alan Robinson	464	15.7	
Labour	Peter Swann	414	14.0	
Labour	Paul Wilkinson	390	13.2	
Liberal Democrats	Scott Sinclair	213	7.2	
Turnout		2,947		
Conservative hold				
Conservative hold				
Conservative hold				

=== Bottesford ===
Bottesford
Party	Candidate	Votes	%	±%
Conservative	Margaret Armiger	1,691	54.6	
Conservative	John Davison	1,670	53.9	
Conservative	Derek Longcake	1,670	53.9	
Labour	Glyn Williams	1,285	41.5	
Labour	Janet Metcalfe	1,282	41.4	
Labour	Naj Modak	1,175	37.9	
Turnout		3,098		
Conservative hold				
Conservative hold				
Conservative hold				

=== Brigg & Wolds ===
Brigg & Wolds
Party	Candidate	Votes	%	±%
Conservative	Carl Sherwood	2,121	61.5	
Conservative	Rob Waltham	2,101	60.9	
Conservative	Nigel Sherwood	2,066	59.9	
Labour	Michael Campion	603	17.5	
Green	John Bateman	550	15.9	
Labour	Graham Ladlow	480	13.9	
Labour	Sadie Simons	480	13.9	
For Britain	Michael Speakman	364	10.5	
Liberal Democrats	Peter McKenzie-Brown	340	9.9	
Liberal Democrats	Christopher Stockdale	340	9.9	
Turnout		3,451		
Conservative hold				
Conservative hold				
Conservative hold				

=== Broughton & Appleby ===
Broughton & Appleby
Party	Candidate	Votes	%	±%
Conservative	Holly Mumby-Croft	1,210	64.5	
Conservative	Ivan Glover	1,205	64.2	
Labour	Cath Whittingham	464	24.7	
Labour	Mo Whitaker-Clark	388	20.7	
Green	Katie Graham	280	14.9	
Turnout		1,876		
Conservative hold				
Conservative hold				

=== Brumby ===
Brumby
Party	Candidate	Votes	%	±%
Labour	Leonard Foster	1,015	54.0	
Labour	Susan Armitage	992	52.8	
Labour	Stephen Swift	929	49.4	
UKIP	Kenneth Smith	454	24.2	
Conservative	Joanne Brown	349	18.6	
Conservative	Jake Newbury	290	15.4	
Conservative	Michael Swallow	286	15.2	
Green	Peter Dennington	267	14.2	
Turnout		1,879		
Labour hold				
Labour hold				
Labour hold				

=== Burringham & Gunness ===
Burringham & Gunness
Party	Candidate	Votes	%	±%
Conservative	Joshua Walshe	604	53.2	
Labour	David Oldfield	531	46.8	
Turnout		1,135		
Conservative gain from Labour		Swing		

=== Burton Upon Stather & Winterton ===
Burton Upon Stather & Winterton
Party	Candidate	Votes	%	±%
Conservative	Ralph Ogg	2,378	63.5	
Conservative	Elaine Marper	2,331	62.3	
Conservative	Helen Rowson	2,320	62.0	
Labour	Paul McCartan	1,228	32.8	
Labour	Stuart Maw	1,204	32.2	
Labour	Victoria Mumby	1,185	31.7	
Turnout		3,742		
Conservative hold				
Conservative hold				
Conservative hold				

=== Crosby & Park ===
Crosby & Park
Party	Candidate	Votes	%	±%
Labour	Mark Kirk	1,303	64.1	
Labour	Christine O'Sullivan	1,250	61.5	
Labour	Darryl Southern	1,234	60.7	
Conservative	Mary Allen	521	25.6	
Conservative	Arthur Bunyan	473	23.3	
Conservative	Jennie Eckhardt	457	22.5	
Turnout		2,032		
Labour hold				
Labour hold				
Labour hold				

=== Ferry ===
Ferry
Party	Candidate	Votes	%	±%
Conservative	Peter Clark	1,533	51.4	
Conservative	Richard Hannigan	1,415	47.4	
Conservative	David Wells	1,316	44.1	
Green	Rebecca Fawcett	748	25.1	
Labour	Emma Abbott	730	24.5	
Labour	Jayne Gale	647	21.7	
Independent	Mark Cleghorn	627	21.0	
Labour	Kenneth Hesketh	567	19.0	
Turnout		2,985		
Conservative hold				
Conservative hold				
Conservative hold				

=== Frodingham ===
Frodingham
Party	Candidate	Votes	%	±%
Labour	Anthony Ellerby	715	49.6	
Labour	Sandra Bainbridge	643	44.6	
Independent	Des Comerford	616	42.7	
Conservative	Barbara Allcock	218	15.1	
Conservative	Addison Potter	169	11.7	
Turnout		1,441		
Labour hold				
Labour hold				

=== Kingsway with Lincoln Gardens ===
Kingsway with Lincoln Gardens
Party	Candidate	Votes	%	±%
Labour	Antony Gosling	1,259	55.7	
Labour	Stuart Wilson	1,243	55.0	
Labour	Helen Rayner	1,211	53.6	
Conservative	Alec Readhead	637	28.2	
Conservative	James Knight	619	27.4	
Conservative	Eloise Nicholls	584	25.8	
Green	Jo Baker	456	20.2	
Turnout		2,261		
Labour hold				
Labour hold				
Labour hold				

=== Ridge ===
Ridge
Party	Candidate	Votes	%	±%
Conservative	Neil Poole	2,027	58.8	
Conservative	Trevor Foster	1,963	56.9	
Conservative	John England	1,943	56.3	
Labour	Maggie Davies	906	26.3	
Labour	Geoffrey Cossey	820	23.8	
Green	Jacqui Stirling	820	23.8	
Labour	Edward Hawksley-Crowden	656	19.0	
Turnout		3,449		
Conservative hold				
Conservative hold				
Conservative hold				

=== Town ===
Town
Party	Candidate	Votes	%	±%
Labour	Lorraine Yeadon	976	68.8	
Labour	Mashook Ali	942	66.4	
Conservative	Susan England	333	23.5	
Conservative	Anne Hannigan	292	20.6	
Turnout		1,418		
Labour hold				
Labour hold				
