= Nic Dakin =

British politician (born 1955)

Sir Nic Dakin MP
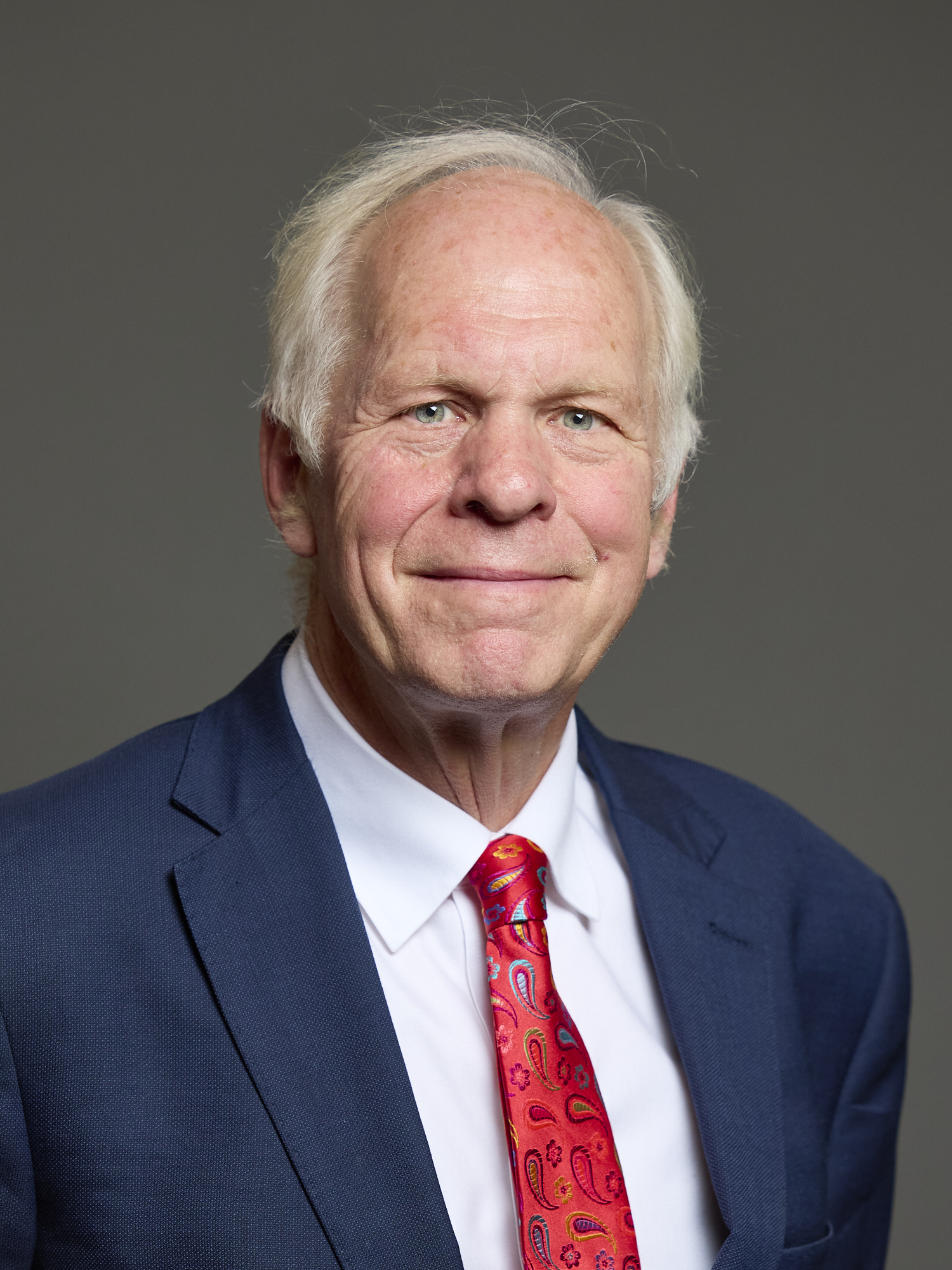
- Official portrait, 2024

Parliamentary Private Secretary to the Prime Minister
- Incumbent
- Assumed office 27 July 2026 Serving with David Baines and Jo Platt
- Prime Minister: Andy Burnham
- Preceded by: Abena Oppong-Asare; Jon Pearce; Catherine Fookes

Vice-Chamberlain of the Household
- In office 16 September 2025 – 21 July 2026
- Prime Minister: Keir Starmer
- Preceded by: Lilian Greenwood
- Succeeded by: Emma Foody

Lord Commissioner of the Treasury
- In office 10 July 2024 – 16 September 2025
- Prime Minister: Keir Starmer

Parliamentary Under-Secretary of State for Sentencing
- In office 23 July 2024 – 7 September 2025
- Prime Minister: Keir Starmer
- Preceded by: Gareth Bacon
- Succeeded by: Jake Richards
Shadow ministerial portfolios
Shadow Minister for Schools
In office 18 September 2015 – 27 June 2016
| Leader | Jeremy Corbyn |
| Preceded by | Kevin Brennan |
| Succeeded by | Mike Kane |
Shadow Deputy Leader of the House of Commons
In office 8 May 2015 – 18 September 2015
| Leader | Harriet Harman (acting) |
| Preceded by | Thomas Docherty |
| Succeeded by | Melanie Onn |

Member of Parliament for Scunthorpe
- Incumbent
- Assumed office 4 July 2024
- Preceded by: Holly Mumby-Croft
- Majority: 3,542 (9.1%)
- In office 6 May 2010 – 6 November 2019
- Preceded by: Elliot Morley
- Succeeded by: Holly Mumby-Croft

Personal details
- Born: Nicholas Dakin; 10 July 1955 (age 71)
- Party: Labour
- Spouse: Audrey Balsom (m. 1979)
- Children: 3
- Education: University of Hull; King's College London
- Profession: Politician; teacher

Sir Nicholas Dakin (born 10 July 1955) is a British politician who has served as the Member of Parliament (MP) for Scunthorpe since 2024, having previously served from 2010 to 2019. He is a member of the Labour Party.

He was the Shadow Minister for Schools from 2015 to 2016, Shadow Deputy Leader of the House of Commons in 2015, an opposition whip from 2011 to 2015 and 2016 to 2019, Parliamentary Under-Secretary of State for Sentencing from 2024 to 2025, and Vice-Chamberlain of the Household from 2025 to 2026.

== Early life ==
Dakin grew up at 22 Main Street in Cossington, where he went to Cossington C of E Primary School. His parents were Roy Dakin and Elsie Lee. His mother was, originally, a nurse. In the early 1970s, his mother trained as a teacher at Leicester College of Education at Scraptoft, now part of De Montfort University. With his mother's elder sister Edith, his mother appeared as Florrie and Ada on Radio Leicester. His uncle was Jack Lee. Both Nic and his mother took part in productions by the Sileby Methodist Players. His mother taught from 1972 to 1980 at St Peter's and St Paul's Primary School at Syston, and part-time from 1980, working with special needs and remedial, teaching embroidery for her last six years, retiring in July 1988. His mother worked with the Women's Institute.

He went to secondary school there, before studying at the University of Hull and then King's College London, completing his undergraduate degree and then his PGCE respectively. He had previously trained as an accountant.

He taught English in Gävle, in eastern Sweden, and then at John Leggott College in Scunthorpe, where he became principal.

While teaching at John Leggott College, he was also a local councillor for Kingsway with Lincoln Gardens and then leader of North Lincolnshire Council from 1997 to 2003. He was also the deputy chair of Yorkshire Forward from 2005 to 2007.

== Parliamentary career ==
In October 2009 he was selected to stand for Labour in the Scunthorpe constituency and won the seat in May 2010 with a majority of 2,549. Subsequently, he won in 2015 and 2017. In 2017 he won with a 52% share of the vote.

Dakin has previously served on the Education Select Committee and was a member of the House of Common's Procedure Committee and the Speaker's Advisory Committee on Works of Art.

In October 2011 Dakin was appointed an Opposition Whip under Ed Miliband. In May 2015 he was given the additional role of Shadow Deputy Leader of the House of Commons. After Jeremy Corbyn won the leadership of the Labour Party in September 2015, Dakin was made Shadow Minister for Schools. In June 2016 Dakin resigned his Shadow Cabinet position, citing loss of confidence in the Labour leader. He supported Owen Smith in the failed attempt to replace Jeremy Corbyn in the 2016 Labour leadership election.

In October 2016 Dakin re-joined the Opposition Whips' office.

Until his election defeat, Dakin was the chair of several All-Party Parliamentary Groups (APPGs) including: Steel and Metal Related Industries; Pancreatic Cancer; Education, Skills and Employment; and Bioethanol.

In the 2019 general election he lost his seat to the Conservative former North Lincolnshire Council Councillor Holly Mumby-Croft.

Dakin was knighted in the 2020 Birthday Honours for political service. In December 2022 he was chosen to stand again as the Labour prospective parliamentary candidate for Scunthorpe in the 2024 general election, which he won against Conservative MP Holly Mumby-Croft, regaining his seat as MP and assuming office on 4 July.

In November 2024, Dakin voted in favour of the Terminally Ill Adults (End of Life) Bill, which proposes to legalise assisted suicide.

== Personal life ==
In 1979 Dakin married Audrey Balsom in Leicester; his wife was a midwife, and a representative of the National Childbirth Trust, and the Royal College of Midwives. Dakin has two daughters and a son.

Parliament of the United Kingdom
| Preceded by Elliot Morley | Member of Parliament for Scunthorpe; 2010–2019 | Succeeded by Holly Mumby-Croft |
| Preceded by Holly Mumby-Croft | Member of Parliament for Scunthorpe; 2024– | Incumbent |
