= Scunthorpe (constituency) =

UK Parliament constituency (since 1997)

Coordinates: 53.57°N 0.63°W

- County constituency for the House of Commons
- Boundaries since 2024
- Boundary of Scunthorpe in Yorkshire and the Humber
- County: North Lincolnshire
- Electorate: 60,345 (December 2019)
- Major settlements: Scunthorpe, Messingham, Bottesford, Kirton in Lindsey

Current constituency
- Created: 1997
- Member of Parliament: Nic Dakin (Labour)
- Seats: One
- Created from: Glanford & Scunthorpe

Scunthorpe is a constituency (Note: A county constituency (for the purposes of election expenses and type of returning officer)) represented in the House of Commons of the UK Parliament since 2024 by Nic Dakin, a member of the Labour Party, when he regained his seat from Conservative Party politician Holly Mumby-Croft in the 2024 general election. (Note: As with all constituencies, the constituency elects one Member of Parliament (MP) by the first past the post system of election at least every five years.)

== Constituency profile ==
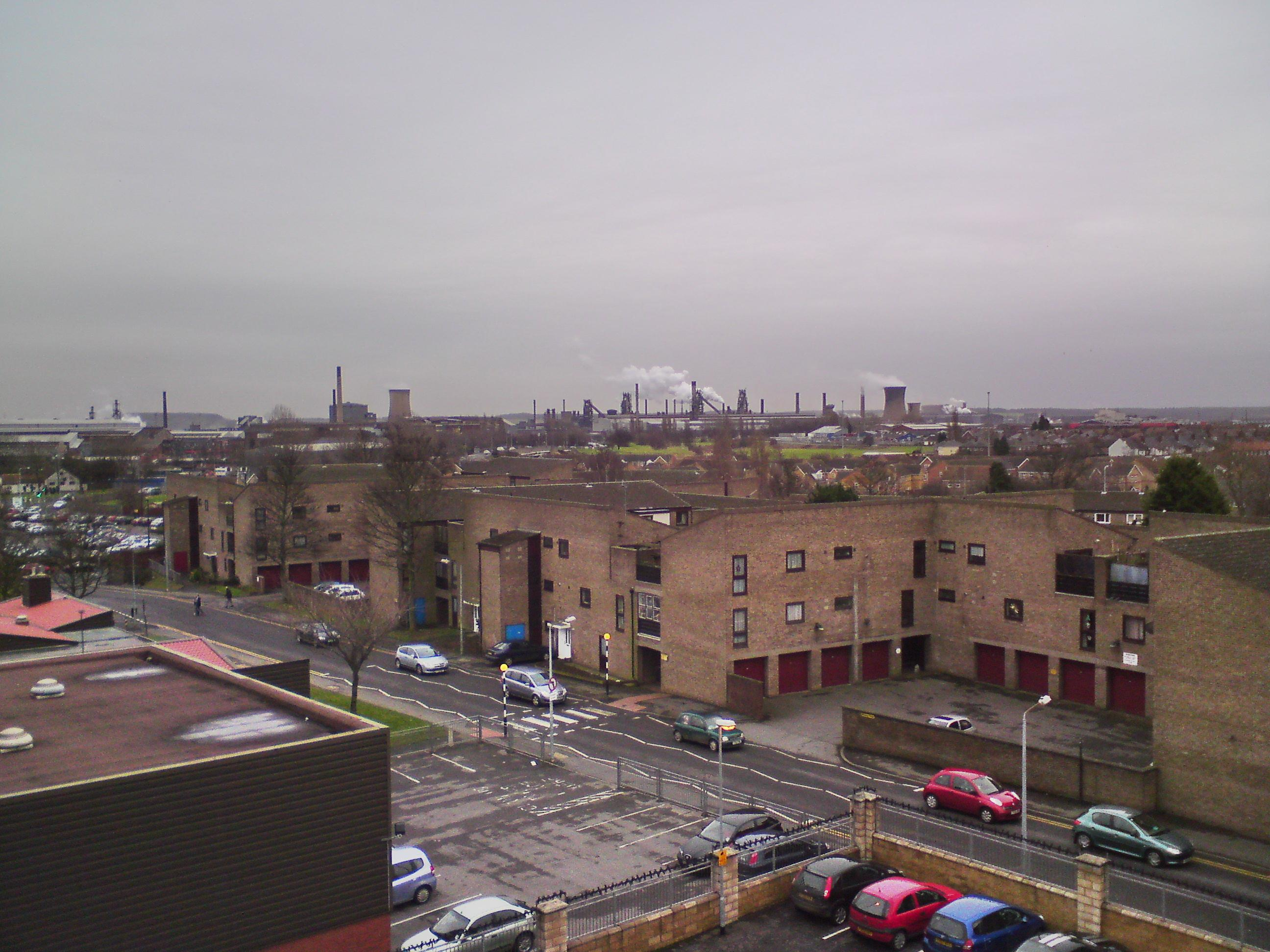
Scunthorpe with Scunthorpe Steelworks visible in the background

Scunthorpe is a constituency in Lincolnshire in England, within the North Lincolnshire borough. Its main settlement is the town of Scunthorpe, which has a population of around 83,000. The constituency also covers rural areas outside the town, including the small market towns of Kirton in Lindsey and Winterton and the village of Messingham.

Scunthorpe is a large industrial town. It was a small, rural settlement until the late 19th century when ironstone was discovered in the local area and the town became an important centre for iron and steel production. Whilst this industry has largely declined since the 1970s, Scunthorpe Steelworks remains in operation as the only factory in the UK capable of producing virgin as opposed to recycled steel. Large parts of the Scunthorpe are highly-deprived, although the rural areas and some of the town's suburbs are wealthier. Most residents live in semi-detached housing estates and the average house price is less than half the UK average.

Scunthorpe has an above-average population of retirees and a below-average proportion of young adults. Residents have low rates of income and average levels of homeownership. The child poverty rate is high. Residents generally have low levels of education and a high proportion work in the manufacturing sector. The percentage claiming unemployment benefits is in line with the UK-wide rate. White people made up 92% of the population at the 2021 census.

At the local council, the town of Scunthorpe is represented by the Labour Party whilst the rural towns and villages elected Conservative councillors. Voters in this constituency strongly supported leaving the European Union in the 2016 referendum; an estimated 68% voted in favour of Brexit compared to the UK-wide rate of 52%.

== Boundaries ==
=== Historical ===
1997–2010: The Borough of Scunthorpe, and the Borough of Glanford wards of Bottesford Central, Bottesford East, Bottesford West, Kirton, Messingham, and South Ancholme.

Map of 2010-2024 boundaries

2010–2024: The Borough of North Lincolnshire wards of Ashby, Bottesford, Brumby, Crosby and Park, Frodingham, Kingsway with Lincoln Gardens, Ridge, and Town.

=== Current ===
The 2023 periodic review of Westminster constituencies defined the constituency as being composed of the following wards of the District of North Lincolnshire as they existed on 1 December 2020:

- Ashby; Bottesford; Brumby; Burringham and Gunness; Burton upon Stather and Winterton; Crosby and Park; Frodingham; Kingsway with Lincoln Gardens; Ridge; and Town.

Seat expanded to bring its electorate within the permitted range by adding the Burringham and Gunness, and Burton upon Stather and Winterton wards (as they existed in 2020) from Brigg and Goole (abolished).

Following a local government boundary review which came into effect in May 2023, the constituency now comprises the following wards of the District of North Lincolnshire from the 2024 general election:

- Ashby Central ; Ashby Lakeside; Bottesford; Brigg & Wolds (parish of Cadney); Broughton & Scawby (parish of Scawby); Brumby; Burringham & Gunness; Burton upon Stather & Winterton (except parishes of Appleby and Roxby cum Risby); Crosby & Park; Frodingham; Kingsway with Lincoln Gardens; Messingham; Ridge; Town.

The constituency comprises the town of Scunthorpe itself, together with the communities of Bottesford, Yaddlethorpe, Messingham, Kirton-in-Lindsey, Redbourne, Hibaldstow, Cadney, Burton upon Stather, Winterton and surrounding hamlets and rural areas.

== History ==
Although there was talk in a local newspaper in the 1930s that the town of Scunthorpe should have a parliamentary constituency named after it, it was only after the boundary reviews implemented in 1997 that a constituency of this name was created. Previous incarnations of a constituency containing the steel town and small towns and villages around it had been called (going backwards in time) Glanford and Scunthorpe, Brigg and Scunthorpe, and Brigg.

== Members of Parliament ==
Nic Dakin was elected in the 2010 general election with a lower share of the vote than achieved under the Blair Ministry by his predecessor, with 39.5% of the votes.

Glanford & Scunthorpe prior to 1997

Election	Member	Party
1997	Elliot Morley	Labour
2010	Nic Dakin	Labour
2019	Holly Mumby-Croft	Conservative
2024	Nic Dakin	Labour

== Elections ==
=== Elections in the 2020s ===
General election 2024: Scunthorpe
Party	Candidate	Votes	%	±%
Labour	Nic Dakin	15,484	39.7	+4.8
Conservative	Holly Mumby-Croft	11,942	30.6	−25.7
Reform	Darren Haley	8,163	20.9	+16.6
Green	Nick Cox	1,218	3.1	+1.3
Independent	Abdul R Butt	1,202	3.1	N/A
Liberal Democrats	Cahal Burke	942	2.4	−0.2
Heritage	Scott Curtis	100	0.3	N/A
Majority		3,542	9.1	N/A
Turnout		39,051	52.6	−11.0
Registered electors		74,263		
Labour gain from Conservative		Swing	▲15.3	

=== Elections in the 2010s ===
2019 notional result
Party	Vote	%
Conservative	26,616	56.3
Labour	16,483	34.9
Brexit Party	2,044	4.3
Liberal Democrats	1,249	2.6
Green	866	1.8
Turnout	47,258	63.6
Electorate	74,278	

General election 2019: Scunthorpe
Party	Candidate	Votes	%	±%
Conservative	Holly Mumby-Croft	20,306	53.8	+10.3
Labour	Nic Dakin	13,855	36.7	−15.3
Brexit Party	Jerry Gorman	2,044	5.4	N/A
Liberal Democrats	Ryk Downes	875	2.3	+0.9
Green	Peter Dennington	670	1.8	N/A
Majority		6,451	17.1	N/A
Turnout		37,750	60.9	−4.4
Conservative gain from Labour		Swing	+12.8	

General election 2017: Scunthorpe
Party	Candidate	Votes	%	±%
Labour	Nic Dakin	20,916	52.0	+10.3
Conservative	Holly Mumby-Croft	17,485	43.5	+10.3
UKIP	Andy Talliss	1,247	3.1	−14.0
Liberal Democrats	Ryk Downes	554	1.4	−0.7
Majority		3,431	8.5	0.0
Turnout		40,202	65.3	+7.6
Labour hold		Swing	0.0	

General election 2015: Scunthorpe
Party	Candidate	Votes	%	±%
Labour	Nic Dakin	15,393	41.7	+2.2
Conservative	Jo Gideon	12,259	33.2	+0.6
UKIP	Stephen Howd	6,329	17.1	+12.5
Independent	Des Comerford	1,097	3.0	N/A
Green	Martin Dwyer	887	2.4	+1.3
Liberal Democrats	Simon Dodd	770	2.1	−16.2
Independent	Paul Elsom	206	0.6	N/A
Majority		3,134	8.5	+1.6
Turnout		36,941	57.7	−1.0
Labour hold		Swing	+0.8	

General election 2010: Scunthorpe
Party	Candidate	Votes	%	±%
Labour	Nic Dakin	14,640	39.5	−12.5
Conservative	Caroline Johnson	12,091	32.6	+5.8
Liberal Democrats	Neil Poole	6,774	18.3	+1.2
UKIP	Jane Collins	1,686	4.6	+0.5
BNP	Douglas Ward	1,447	3.9	N/A
Green	Natalie Hurst	396	1.1	N/A
Majority		2,549	6.9	−20.5
Turnout		37,034	58.7	+4.3
Labour hold		Swing	-9.2	

=== Elections in the 2000s ===
General election 2005: Scunthorpe
Party	Candidate	Votes	%	±%
Labour	Elliot Morley	17,355	53.1	−6.7
Conservative	Julian Sturdy	8,392	25.7	−3.2
Liberal Democrats	Neil Poole	5,556	17.0	+7.6
UKIP	David Baxendale	1,361	4.2	N/A
Majority		8,963	27.4	−3.5
Turnout		32,664	54.3	−2.0
Labour hold		Swing	-1.7	

General election 2001: Scunthorpe
Party	Candidate	Votes	%	±%
Labour	Elliot Morley	20,096	59.8	−0.6
Conservative	Bernard Theobald	9,724	28.9	+2.6
Liberal Democrats	Bob Tress	3,156	9.4	+1.0
Independent	Michael Cliff	347	1.0	N/A
Independent	David Patterson	302	0.9	N/A
Majority		10,372	30.9	−3.2
Turnout		33,625	56.3	−12.5
Labour hold		Swing	-1.6	

=== Elections in the 1990s ===
General election 1997: Scunthorpe
Party	Candidate	Votes	%	±%
Labour	Elliot Morley	25,107	60.4	
Conservative	Martyn Fisher	10,934	26.3	
Liberal Democrats	Gordon Smith	3,497	8.4	
Referendum	Paul Smith	1,637	3.9	
Socialist Labour	Brian Hopper	399	1.0	
Majority		14,173	34.1	
Turnout		41,574	68.8	
Labour win (new seat)				

== See also ==
- List of parliamentary constituencies in Humberside
- List of parliamentary constituencies in the Yorkshire and the Humber (region)
