= 2003 North Lincolnshire Council election =

2003 UK local government election

Results of the 2003 North Lincolnshire Council election

Elections to North Lincolnshire Council were held on 1 May 2003. The Labour Party lost its overall majority to the Conservative Party. Overall turnout was 51.3%.

== Election result ==
North Lincolnshire local election result 2003
Party	Seats	Gains	Losses	Net gain/loss	Seats %	Votes %	Votes	+/−
Conservative	22			+2	51.16%	45.16%	61,205	
Labour	21			-2	48.84%	43.64%	59,138	
Liberal Democrats	0			0	0%	10.63%	14,411	
Socialist Labour	0				0%	0.37%	496	
Independent	0				0%	0.20%	276	
