= 2007 North Lincolnshire Council election =

2007 UK local government election

Results of the 2007 North Lincolnshire Council election

Elections to North Lincolnshire Council were held on 3 May 2007. The Conservative Party lost its overall majority to the Labour Party. Overall turnout was 32%.

== Election result ==
North Lincolnshire local election result 2007
Party	Seats	Gains	Losses	Net gain/loss	Seats %	Votes %	Votes	+/−
Labour	22	2	1	+1	51.2%	42.1%	35,917	-1.54%
Conservative	16	1	4	-3	37.2%	46.1%	39,371	+0.94%
Liberal Democrats	1	1	0	+1	2.3%	8.3%	7054	-2.33%
Independent	1	1	0	+1	2.3%	2.2%	1857	
BNP	0	0	0	0	0%	1.3%	1127	+1.3%

There were 3 vacant seats on the council due to the death of Cllr Dick Long. They were in the Brigg and Wolds ward and were filled in a by-election on 14 June 2007 by Conservative candidates. Before this by-election took place, Cllr Don Stewart of the Axholme South ward defected from the Conservatives, choosing to sit as an Independent. Therefore, the composition of the council after the election was:

Party	Councillors
Labour	22
Conservative	18
Liberal Democrats	1
Independent	2
Total	43
