= North Lincolnshire Council =

Local authority in Lincolnshire, England

Type
- Type: Unitary authority

History
- Founded: 1 April 1996

Leadership
- Mayor: Janet Lee, Conservative since 14 May 2026
- Leader: Rob Waltham, Conservative since 16 January 2017
- Chief Executive: Alison Barker since 1 November 2023

Structure
- Seats: 43 councillors
- Graph of the party split among 43 seats.
- Political groups: Administration (27) Conservative (27) Other parties (16) Labour (15) Reform (1)

Elections
- Last election: 4 May 2023
- Next election: 2027

Meeting place
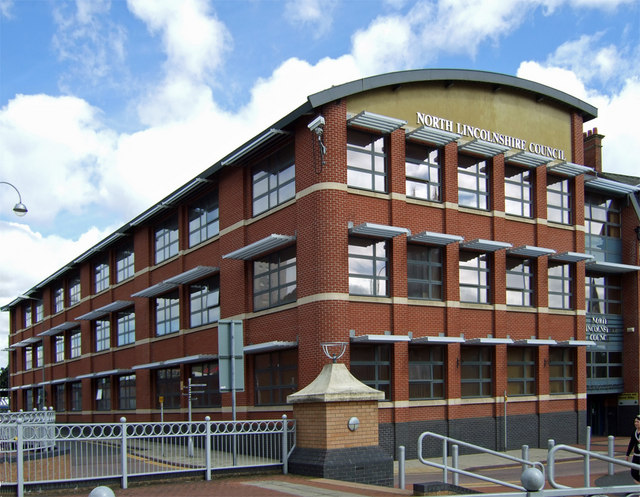
- Church Square House, 30–40 High Street, Scunthorpe, DN15 6NL

Website
- www.northlincs.gov.uk

North Lincolnshire Council is the local authority of North Lincolnshire, a local government district in the ceremonial county of Lincolnshire, England. The council is a unitary authority, being a district council which also performs the functions of a county council; it is independent from Lincolnshire County Council.

The council has been under Conservative majority control since 2011. It is based at Church Square House in Scunthorpe.

== History ==
The district of North Lincolnshire and its council were created on 1 April 1996. The new district covered the whole area of two former districts of Glanford and Scunthorpe, and part of Boothferry district, all of which were abolished at the same time. They had all been lower-tier districts within the county of Humberside prior to the 1996 reforms, with Humberside County Council providing county-level services to the area. Humberside had only been created in 1974; prior to 1974 this area had been part of Lincolnshire.

The way the 1996 changes were implemented was to create both a non-metropolitan district and a non-metropolitan county called North Lincolnshire, but with no separate county council. Instead, the district council also performs the functions that legislation assigns to county councils, making it a unitary authority.

At the same time, the new district was transferred for ceremonial purposes back to Lincolnshire, but as a unitary authority the council has always been independent from Lincolnshire County Council. The district was awarded borough status with effect from 16 December 1996, allowing the chair of the council to take the title of mayor.

In 2025 the council became a member of the new Greater Lincolnshire Combined County Authority, along with North East Lincolnshire Council and Lincolnshire County Council. The combined authority is chaired by the directly-elected Mayor of Greater Lincolnshire.

== Governance ==
As a unitary authority, North Lincolnshire provides the local government services of a non-metropolitan county council and non-metropolitan district council combined. Some functions are still delivered covering the whole of the former county of Humberside, notably the Humberside Fire and Rescue Service. Such functions are managed by joint committees of the four unitary authorities which now cover the area. Much of the borough is covered by civil parishes, which form a lower tier of local government. The only part of the borough not covered by civil parishes is Scunthorpe, which is an unparished area.

=== Political control ===
The first election to the council was held in 1995, initially operating as a shadow authority alongside the outgoing authorities until coming into its powers on 1 April 1996. Political control of the council since 1995 has been as follows:

Party in control	Years
Labour	1996–2003
Conservative	2003–2007
Labour	2007–2011
Conservative	2011–present

=== Leadership ===
The role of mayor is largely ceremonial in North Lincolnshire. Political leadership is instead provided by the leader of the council. The leaders since the council's creation in 1996 have been:

Councillor	Party	From	To
Ian Cawsey	Labour	1 Apr 1996	May 1997
Nic Dakin	Labour	May 1997	May 2003
Don Stewart	Conservative	May 2003	Nov 2004
Alan Holgate	Conservative	9 Dec 2004	2006
Liz Redfern	Conservative	2006	2007
Mark Kirk	Labour	2007	May 2011
Liz Redfern	Conservative	25 May 2011	15 Jan 2017
Rob Waltham	Conservative	16 Jan 2017	

=== Composition ===
Following the 2023 election, and subsequent by-elections and changes up to March 2026, the composition of the council was:

Party	Seats
Conservative	27
Labour	15
Reform	1
Total	43

The next election is due in 2027.

== Premises ==
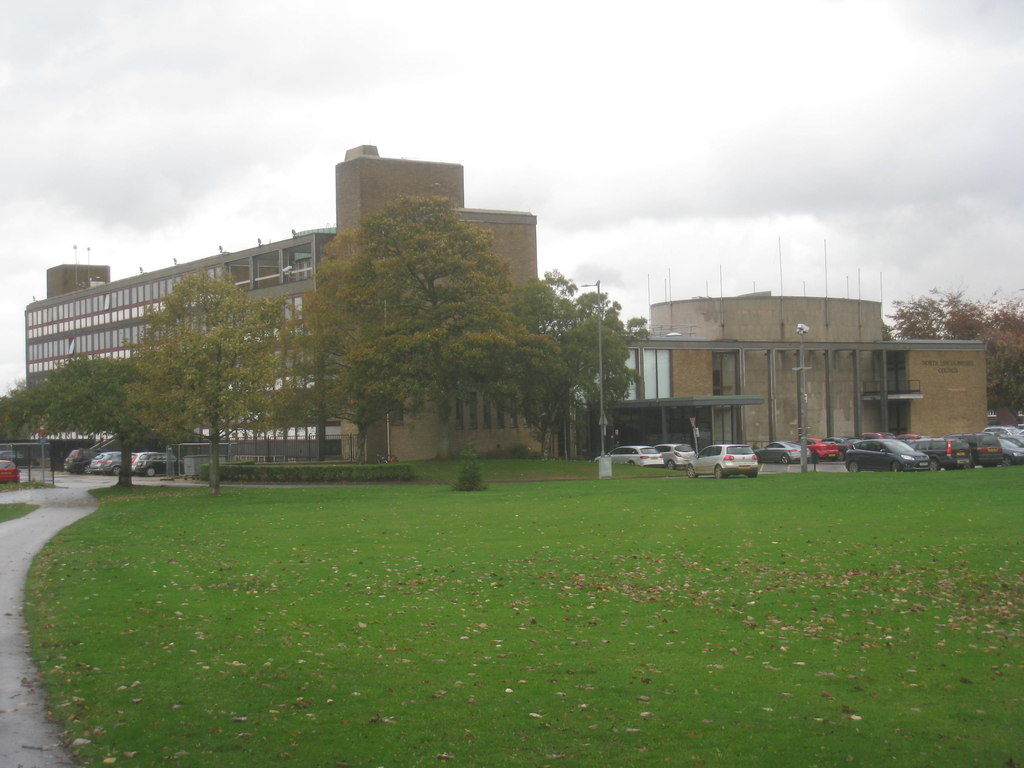
Civic Centre, Scunthorpe: Council's headquarters until 2019

The council is based at Church Square House in the centre of Scunthorpe.

Until 2019 the council's main offices were at Scunthorpe Civic Centre on Ashby Road. The Civic Centre had been completed in 1962 for the former Scunthorpe Borough Council. In 2019 the council extended its existing town centre office at Church Square House to become its main offices. The civic centre was then converted to become a campus of North Lindsey College, an associate college of the University of Lincoln.

== Elections ==
Since the last boundary changes in 2023 the council has comprised 43 councillors representing 19 wards, with each ward electing one, two or three councillors. Elections are held every four years.

=== Wards and councillors ===
There are 19 wards, each represented by between one and three councillors. Following the 2023 election the councillors were:

Parliamentary constituency	Ward	Councillor	Party
Brigg and Goole constituency	Axholme Central	David Robinson	Conservative
Brigg and Goole constituency	Axholme Central	Tim Mitchell	Conservative
Brigg and Goole constituency	Axholme North	John Briggs	Conservative
Brigg and Goole constituency	Axholme North	Julie Reed	Conservative
Brigg and Goole constituency	Axholme South	David Rose	Conservative
Brigg and Goole constituency	Axholme South	Judy Kennedy	Conservative
Brigg and Goole constituency	Brigg and Wolds	Carl Sherwood	Conservative
Brigg and Goole constituency	Brigg and Wolds	Nigel Sherwood	Conservative
Brigg and Goole constituency	Brigg and Wolds	Rob Waltham	Conservative
Brigg and Goole constituency	Broughton and Scawby	Janet Lee	Conservative
Brigg and Goole constituency	Broughton and Scawby	Carol Ross	Conservative
Brigg and Goole constituency	Burringham and Gunness	Josh Walshe	Conservative
Brigg and Goole constituency	Burton upon Stather and Winterton	Elaine Marper	Conservative
Brigg and Goole constituency	Burton upon Stather and Winterton	Helen Rowson	Conservative
Brigg and Goole constituency	Burton upon Stather and Winterton	Ralph Ogg	Conservative
Cleethorpes constituency	Barton	Chris Patterson	Conservative
Cleethorpes constituency	Barton	Keith Vickers	Conservative
Cleethorpes constituency	Barton	Paul Vickers	Conservative
Cleethorpes constituency	Ferry	David Wells	Conservative
Cleethorpes constituency	Ferry	Peter Clark	Conservative
Cleethorpes constituency	Ferry	Richard Hannigan	Conservative
Scunthorpe constituency	Ashby Central	Mick Grant	Labour
Scunthorpe constituency	Ashby Central	Andrea Davison	Labour
Scunthorpe constituency	Ashby Lakeside	Max Bell	Labour
Scunthorpe constituency	Ashby Lakeside	Judith Matthews	Labour
Scunthorpe constituency	Bottesford	John Davison	Conservative
Scunthorpe constituency	Bottesford	Margaret Armiger	Conservative
Scunthorpe constituency	Bottesford	Janet Longcake	Conservative
Scunthorpe constituency	Brumby	Len Foster	Labour
Scunthorpe constituency	Brumby	Steve Swift	Labour
Scunthorpe constituency	Brumby	Susan Armitage	Labour
Scunthorpe constituency	Crosby and Park	Naseer Ahmed	Labour
Scunthorpe constituency	Crosby and Park	Christine O'Sullivan	Labour
Scunthorpe constituency	Crosby and Park	Helen Yates	Labour
Scunthorpe constituency	Frodingham	Darryl Southern	Labour
Scunthorpe constituency	Frodingham	Tony Ellerby	Labour
Scunthorpe constituency	Kingsway with Lincoln Gardens	Helen Rayner	Labour
Scunthorpe constituency	Kingsway with Lincoln Gardens	Tony Gosling	Labour
Scunthorpe constituency	Messingham	Neil Poole	Conservative
Scunthorpe constituency	Ridge	David Garritt	Conservative
Scunthorpe constituency	Ridge	Trevor Foster	Conservative
Scunthorpe constituency	Town	Lorraine Yeadon	Labour
Scunthorpe constituency	Town	Mashook Ali	Labour

== Arms ==
Coat of arms of North Lincolnshire Council

Notes
Granted 7 September 1998 by the College of Arms.
Crest
Issuing from a mural crown Vert a Lincoln Red Bull rampant Gules supporting a blast furnace Argent enflamed Or.
Torse
Argent and Azure.
Escutcheon
Or on a fess enarched Vert between three fleurs-de-lys Gules as many cornucopiae Or replenished Proper a bordure engrailed Azure.
Supporters
Dexter an angel Proper habited Argent winged and crined Or wreathed about the temples Argent and Azure about the waist a rope tied in a figure of eight knot Or holding in the exterior hand a trympet bendwise bell downwards also Or sinister a representation of John Wesley Proper habited Sable with the cuffs of his shirt and bands Argent gown hat and stockings Sable his shoes also Sable buckled Or holding in the exterior hand a Bible Proper bound Or holding in the interior hand a chain of five links also Or.
