= Normanby le Wold =

Village and civil parish in the West Lindsey district of Lincolnshire, England

Coordinates: 53.441087°N 0.311015°W

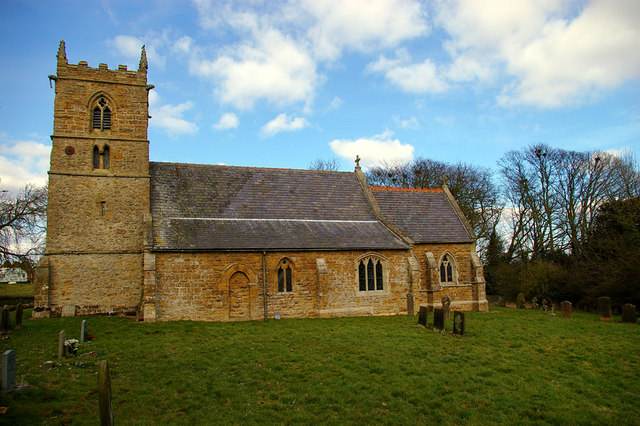
- St Peter's church, Normanby le Wold

- Location within Lincolnshire
- OS grid reference: TF122951
  - London: 135 mi (217 km) S
- District: West Lindsey
- Shire county: Lincolnshire
- Region: East Midlands
- Country: England
- Sovereign state: United Kingdom
- Post town: Market Rasen
- Postcode district: LN7
- Police: Lincolnshire
- Fire: Lincolnshire
- Ambulance: East Midlands
- UK Parliament: Gainsborough

Normanby le Wold is a village and civil parish in the West Lindsey district of Lincolnshire, England. It is in the Lincolnshire Wolds, an Area of Outstanding Natural Beauty, and about 5 miles (8.0 km) south from the town of Caistor, and 17 miles (27 km) north-east from the city and county town of Lincoln. It is in the civil parish of Claxby by Normanby.

Close to Normanby le Wold village is a trig point marking the highest point in Lincolnshire, 551 feet (167.9 m) above sea level. This area is known as Wolds Top.

== History ==
The village had 37 households at the time of Domesday Book of 1086.

The Grade II* listed parish church is dedicated to Saint Peter and built of ironstone, dating from the early 13th century and the 14th century. It was restored in 1868 by James Fowler. Both the vestry and chancel are 19th-century, and the font is 14th-century on a 19th-century base. In the south aisle there is a 16th-century gravestone, seen through a large quatrefoil.

== Community ==
St Peter's Church is part of the Walesby Group of Parishes which comprises Brookenby (St Michael and All Angels), Claxby by Normanby (St Mary), Kirmond le Mire (St Martin), North Willingham (St Thomas), Stainton le Vale (St Andrew), Tealby (All Saints), Walesby (St Mary) and Walesby Old Church (All Saints). The incumbent was The Revd John Carr from 2001 to 2017; following his retirement the group is currently in interregnum. The associate priest is The Revd Elaine Turner.
