= North Willingham =

Village and civil parish in the West Lindsey district of Lincolnshire, England

Coordinates: 53.378968°N 0.252229°W

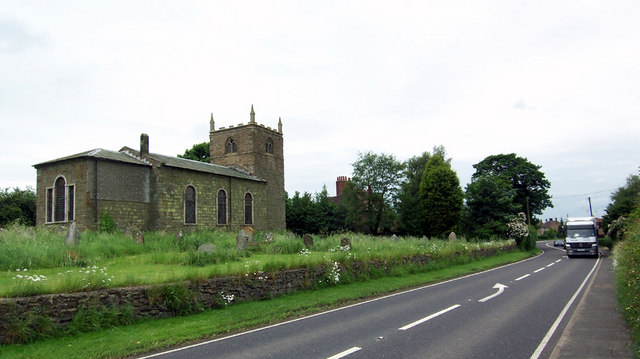
- Church of St Thomas, North Willingham

- Location within Lincolnshire
- Population: 181 (2011)
- OS grid reference: TF163883
  - London: 130 mi (210 km) S
- District: West Lindsey
- Shire county: Lincolnshire
- Region: East Midlands
- Country: England
- Sovereign state: United Kingdom
- Post town: Market Rasen
- Postcode district: LN8
- Police: Lincolnshire
- Fire: Lincolnshire
- Ambulance: East Midlands
- UK Parliament: Gainsborough

North Willingham is a village and civil parish in the West Lindsey district of Lincolnshire, England. The population of the civil parish (including Sixhills) was at 181 during the 2011 census. It is situated 3.5 miles (6 km) east from the town of Market Rasen on the A631 road between Market Rasen and Louth.

The village is listed in the 1086 Domesday Book as "Wunlingeha", with 57 households.

The parish church is dedicated to Saint Thomas the Apostle and is a Grade II listed building dating from the 14th century, with later additions and alterations and an 1896 interior restoration. It contains a 19th-century octagonal font. Built into the west wall of the nave is the head of a 13th-century grave slab, and in the chancel two freestanding crosses brought from Palestine after the First World War.

St. Thomas became part of Walesby Group of Parishes in 1979, which comprises churches in Brookenby, Claxby by Normanby, Kirmond le Mire, Normanby le Wold, Stainton le Vale, Tealby and Walesby.

North Willingham Church of England School was built in 1850 and closed in 1949.

Jessie Boucherett was a campaigner for women's rights. Daughter of Ayscough (sometimes Ayscoghe) Boucherett, High Sheriff of Lincolnshire, she was born at Willingham House in 1825 and died there in 1905, being buried at St. Thomas church. The house was built in 1790 for the Boucherett family.

During the Second World War, Willingham House became Camp 256, a Prisoner Of War (POW) work camp. It held German prisoners who worked as labourers in the local area. Willingham House was demolished in 1976.
