= Claxby by Normanby =

Village and civil parish in the West Lindsey district of Lincolnshire, England

Coordinates: 53.438705°N 0.327438°W

Claxby
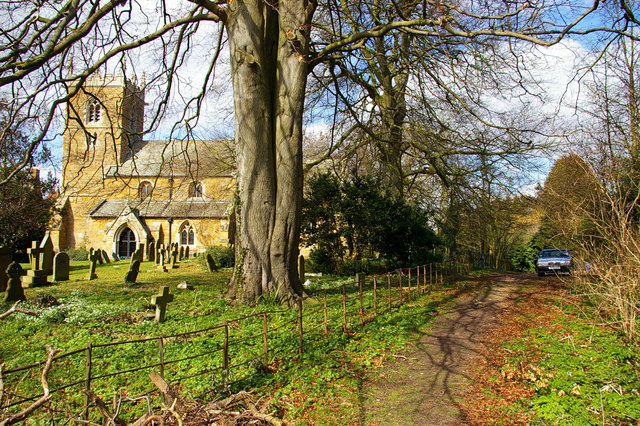
- St Mary's Church, Claxby

- Location within Lincolnshire
- Population: 221 (2011)
- OS grid reference: TF112948
  - London: 135 mi (217 km) S
- Civil parish: Claxby
- District: West Lindsey
- Shire county: Lincolnshire
- Region: East Midlands
- Country: England
- Sovereign state: United Kingdom
- Post town: Market Rasen
- Postcode district: LN8
- Police: Lincolnshire
- Fire: Lincolnshire
- Ambulance: East Midlands
- UK Parliament: Gainsborough

Claxby, or Claxby by Normanby, is a village and civil parish in the West Lindsey district of Lincolnshire, England. The population of the civil parish taken at the 2011 census was 221. It is situated approximately 4 miles (6 km) north from the town of Market Rasen and 5 miles (8 km) south from the town of Caistor.

The parish church is dedicated to Saint Mary and is a Grade I listed building, built of ironstone, dating from the 13th century and restored in 1871 by James Fowler of Louth. On the north side of the chancel is a 13th-century tomb of the founder Brayboeuf. On the south side is a tomb erected in 1605 to John Witherwick (died 1595). There are brasses to Fitzwilliams Armiger (died 1634), Jane Burnaby (died 1653), and Mary Monson (died 1638). The painting of the Annunciation by Charles Edgar Buckeridge was originally in St Margaret's Church, Burton upon Trent.

St Mary's church is part of the Walesby Group of Parishes which also comprises Brookenby (St Michael and All Angels); Kirmond le Mire (St Martin); Normanby le Wold (St Peter); North Willingham (St Thomas); Stainton le Vale (St Andrew); Tealby (All Saints); Walesby (St Mary) and Walesby Old Church (All Saints).

Claxby has a Parish Council consisting of seven Councillors and a Clerk which meets four times per year and maintains its own website.
