= St Mary Magdalene, Enfield =

Church of England church in Enfield, London, England

Coordinates: 51°39′15″N 0°05′50″W

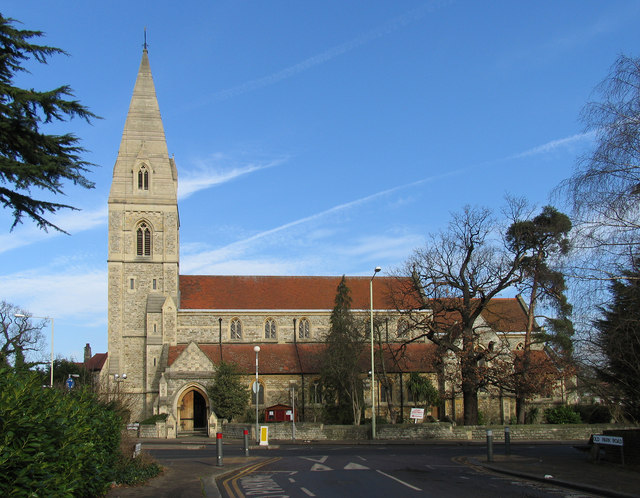
St Mary Magdalene, Enfield

St Mary Magdalene, Enfield, is a Church of England church in Enfield, London, dedicated to Jesus' companion, Mary Magdalene. The building is grade II* listed with Historic England.

== History ==
The church was built as a memorial to Philip Twells, MP and city banker, by his wife Georgiana Twells, who employed the architect William Butterfield. The foundation was stone was laid in 1881 and the church opened in 1883.

The artist Charles Edgar Buckeridge painted the ceiling and east wall of the sanctuary and after his early death the side walls were painted by Nathaniel Westlake. The walls and ceiling were conserved in 2012 by Hirst Conservation with the help of local donations and the Heritage Lottery Fund. The stained-glass windows are by Heaton, Butler and Bayne.

The tower originally contained 8 change ringing bells cast by John Warner & Sons for the new church in 1883, however these were replaced in 1999, as they were too heavy for the tower and were causing damage. The church installed a new, lighter ring of 8 bells cast by the Whitechapel Bell Foundry, and the older, larger bells were bought by Grace Church Cathedral in Charleston, United States, where they were installed and augmented to 10 with two new treble bells cast in the same year, also by Whitechapel.

== Gallery ==
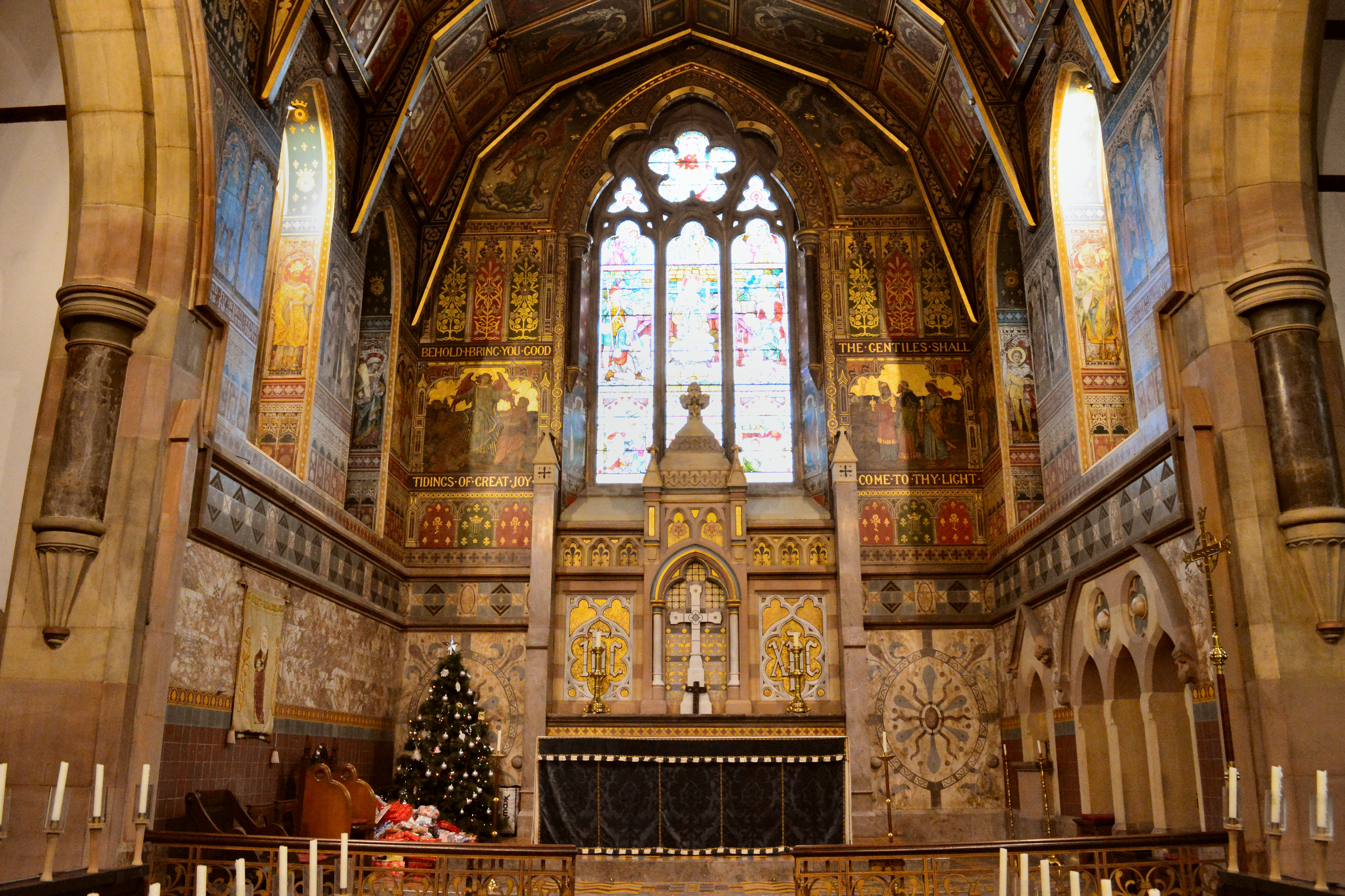
The Sanctuary

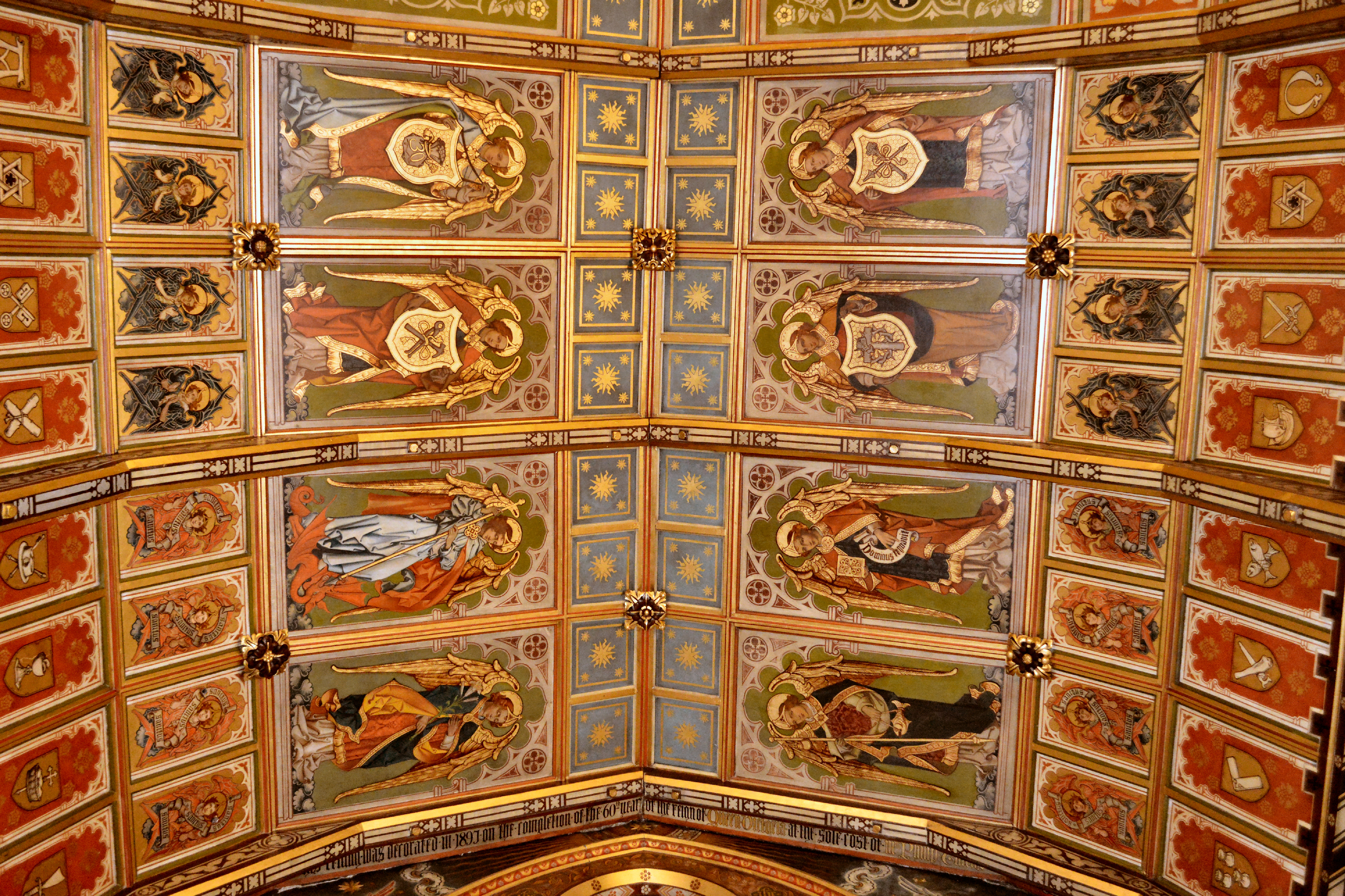
The ceiling

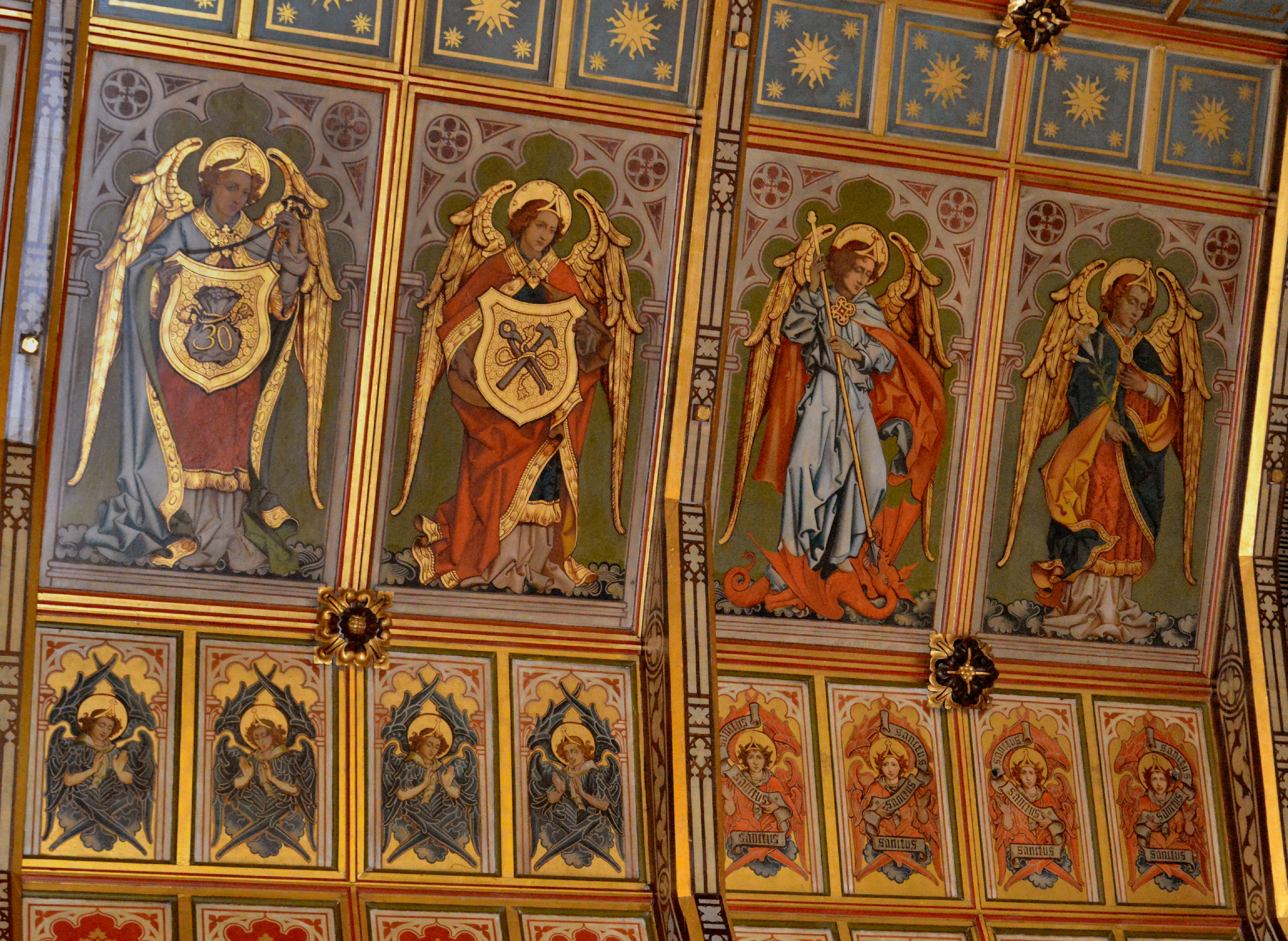
The ceiling

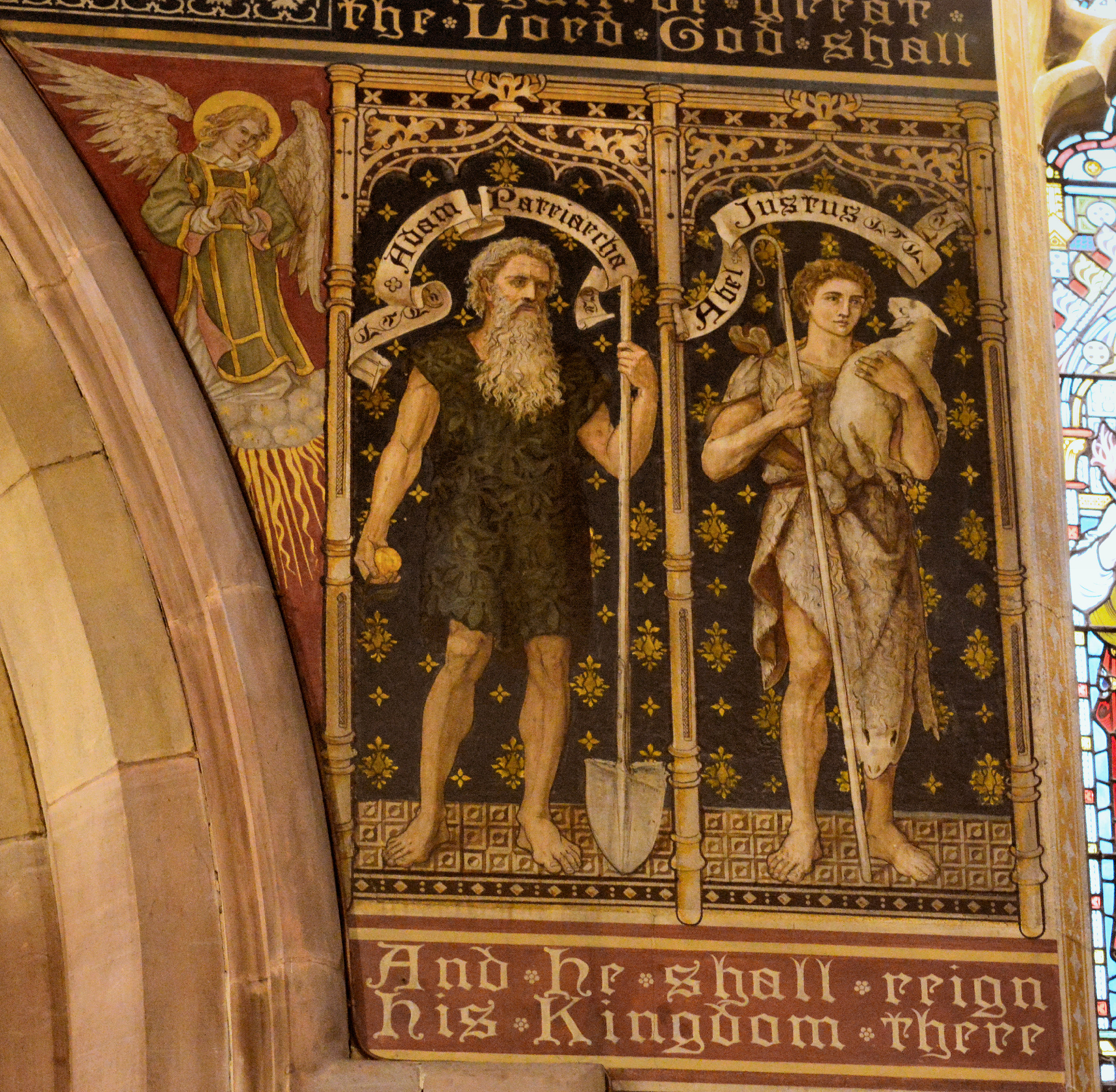
North wall

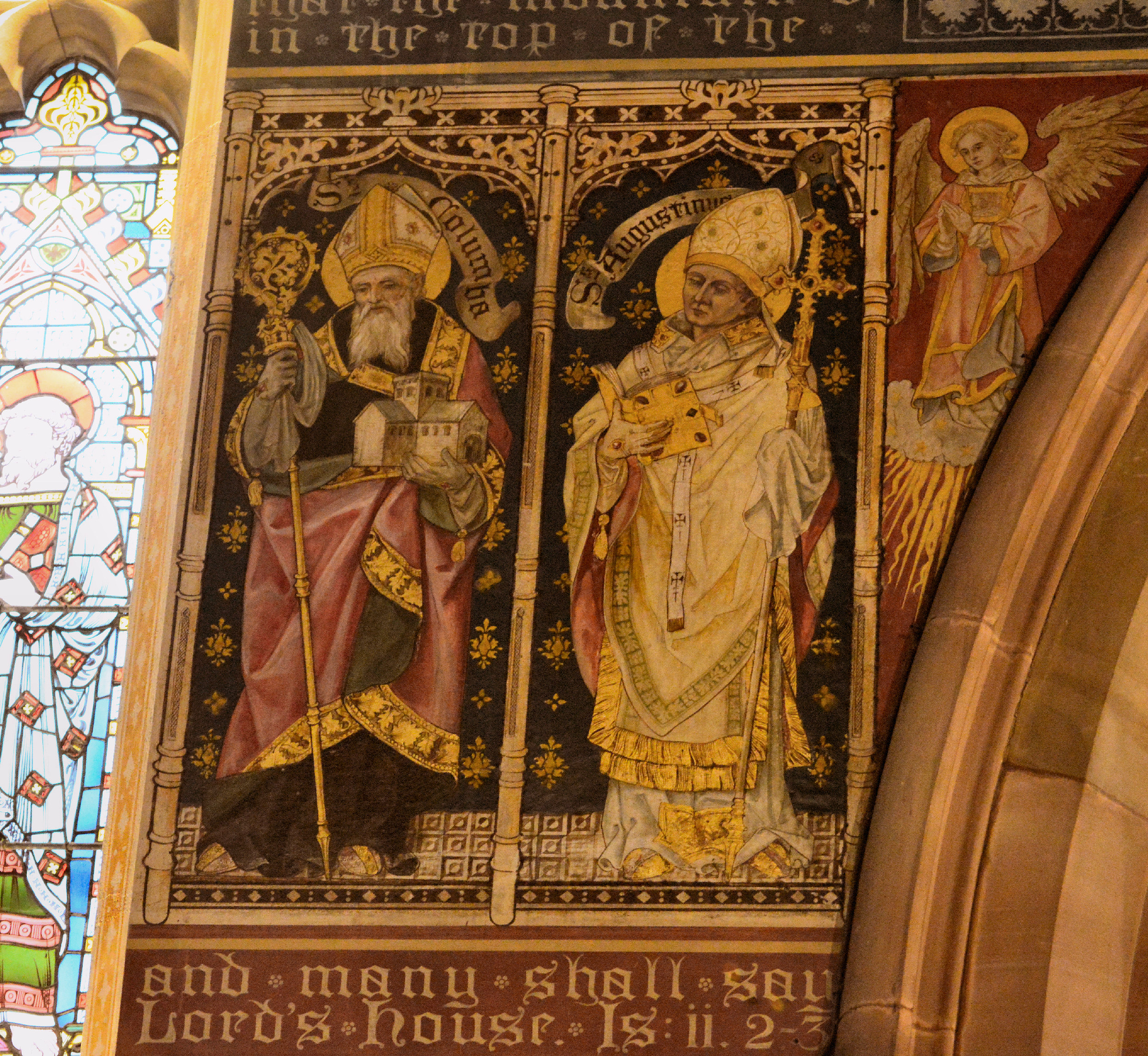
South wall
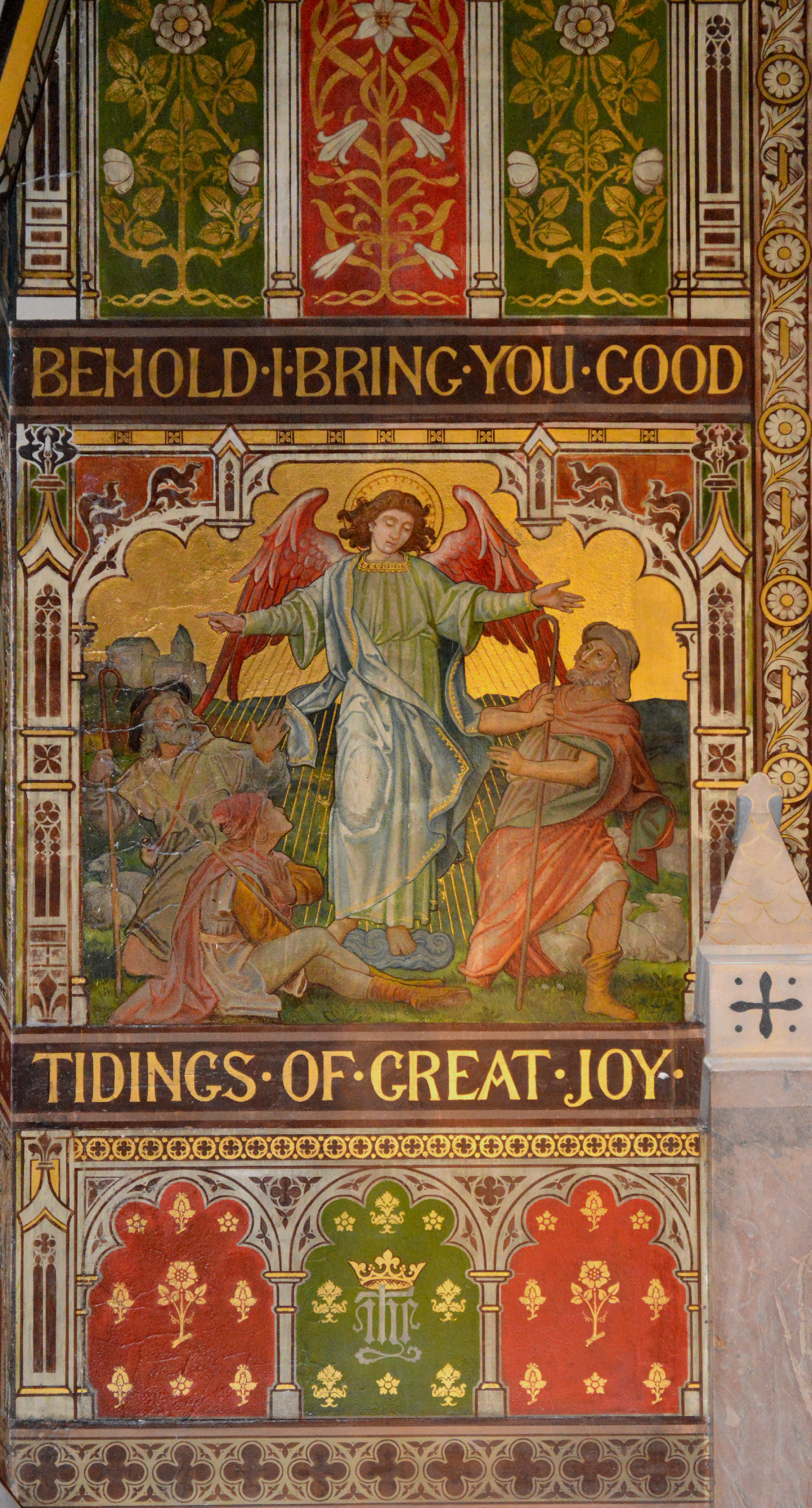
The Angel Gabriel, East wall

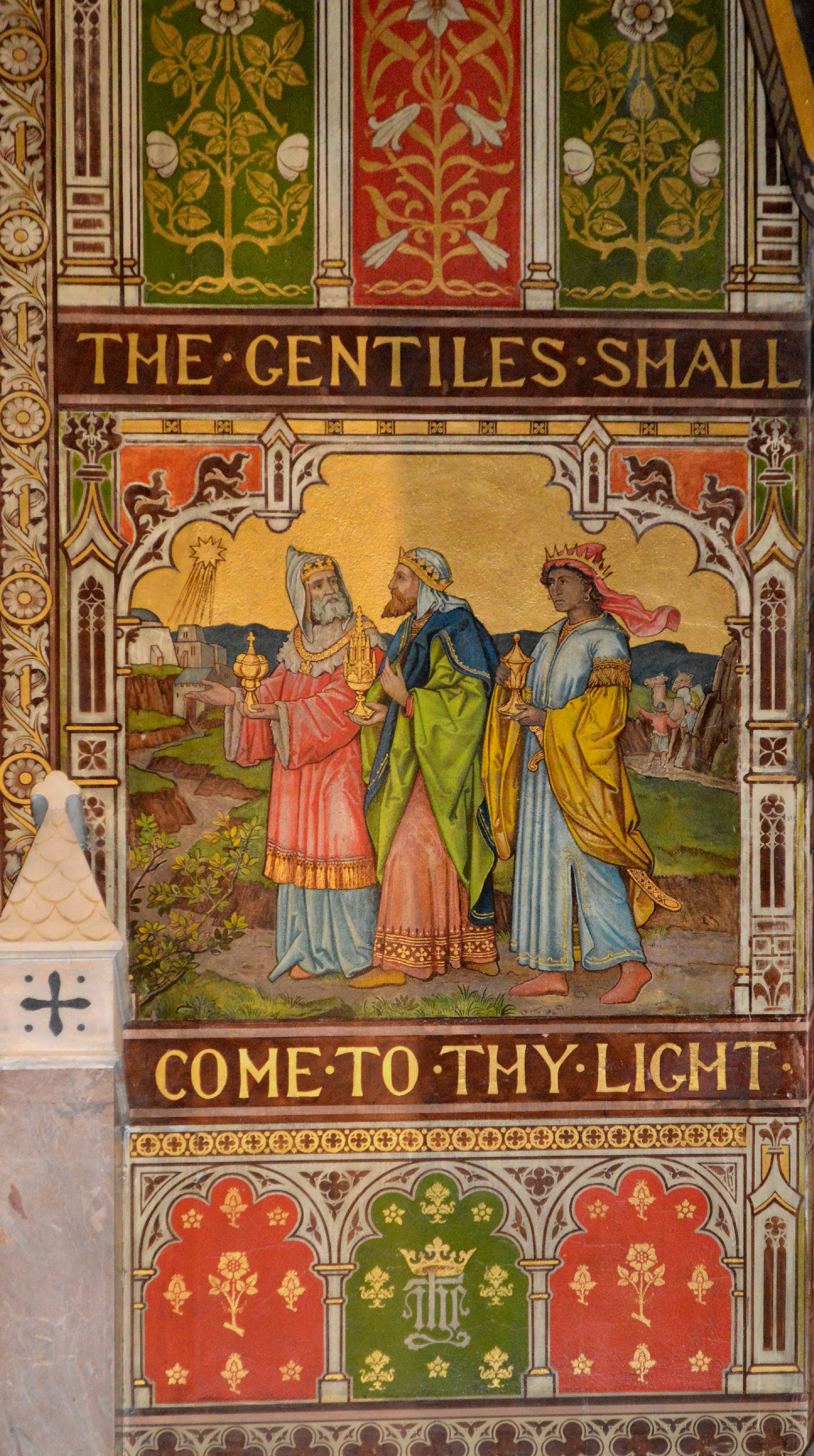
The Magi, East wall

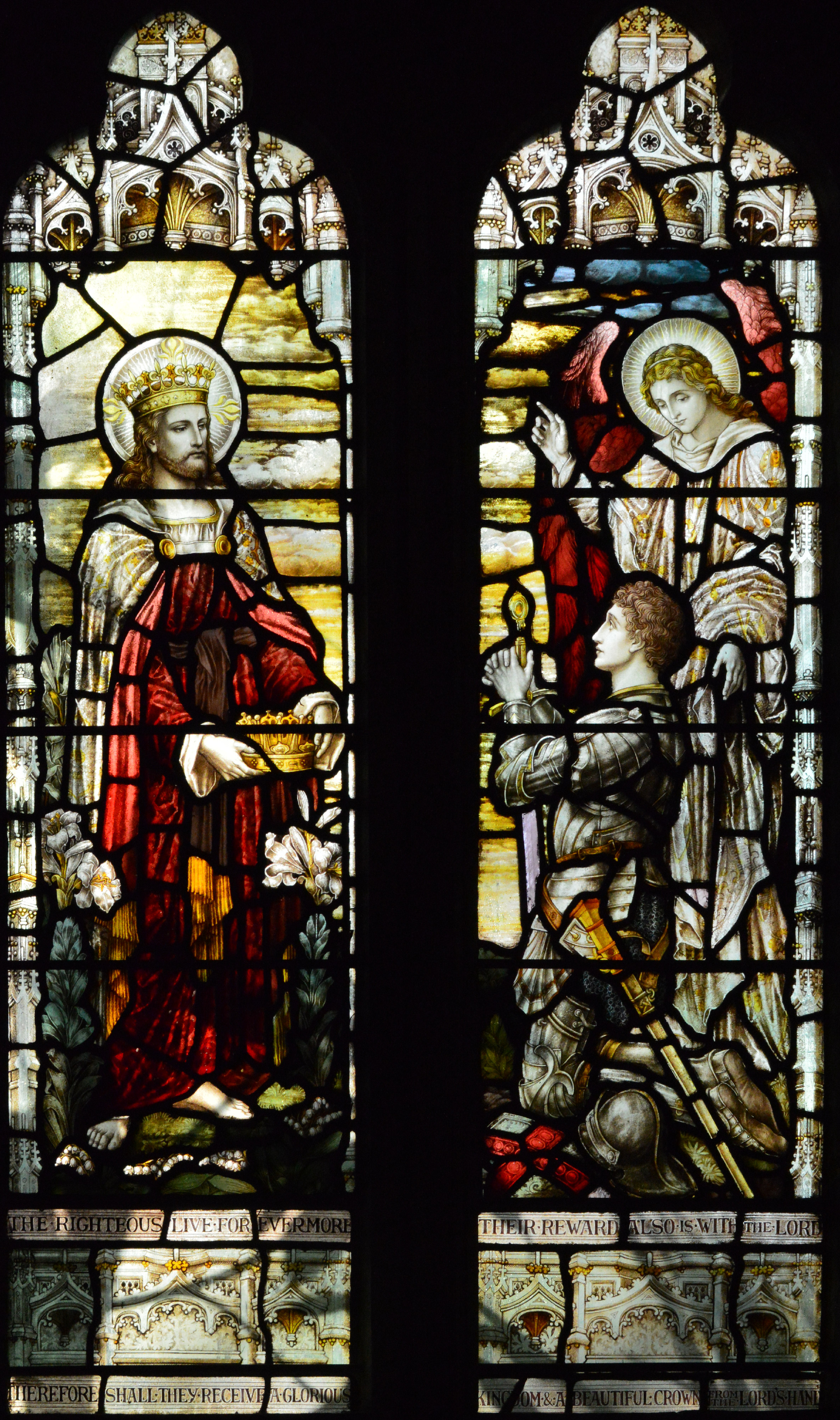
Christian received into Heaven

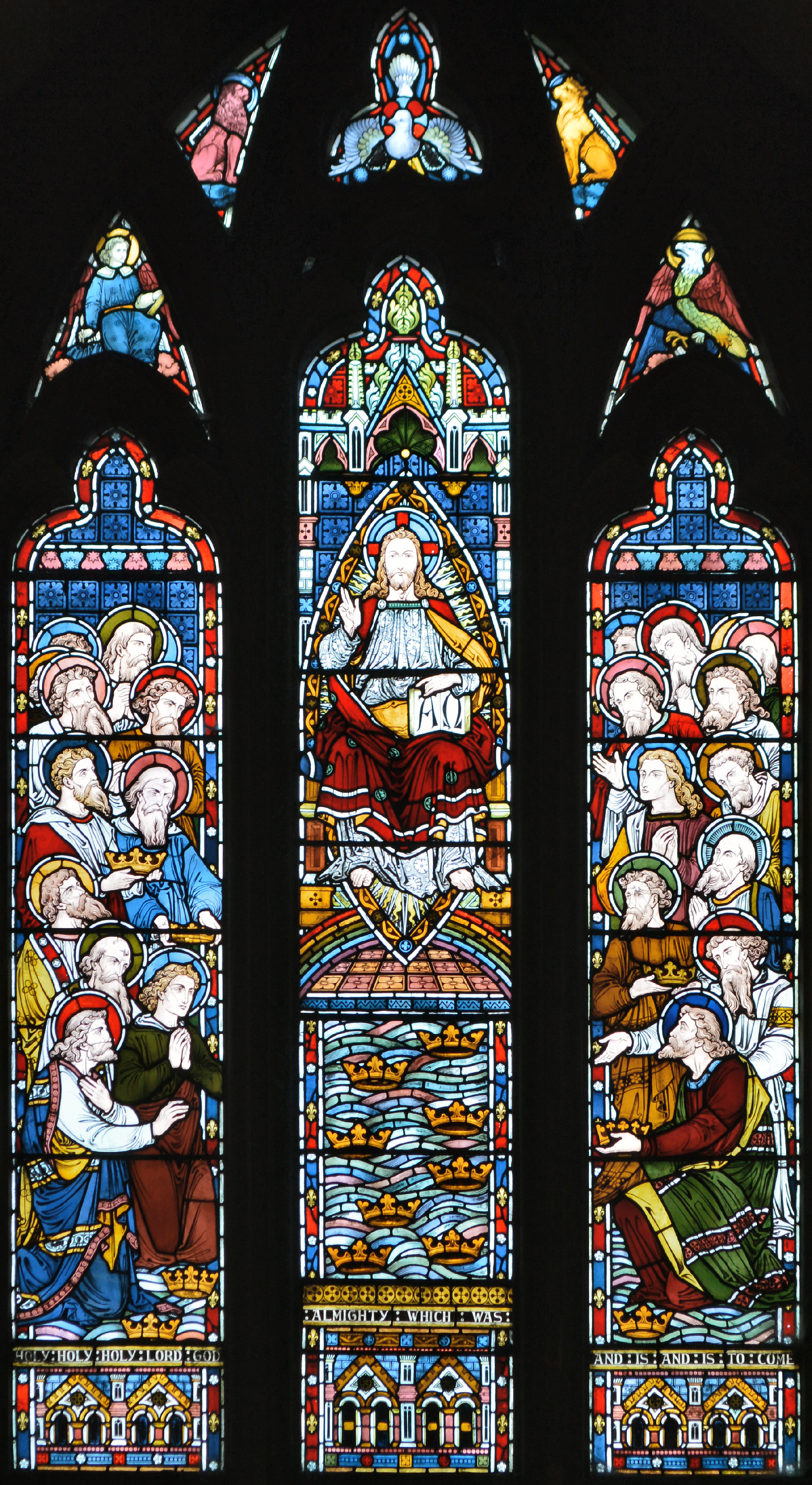
West window

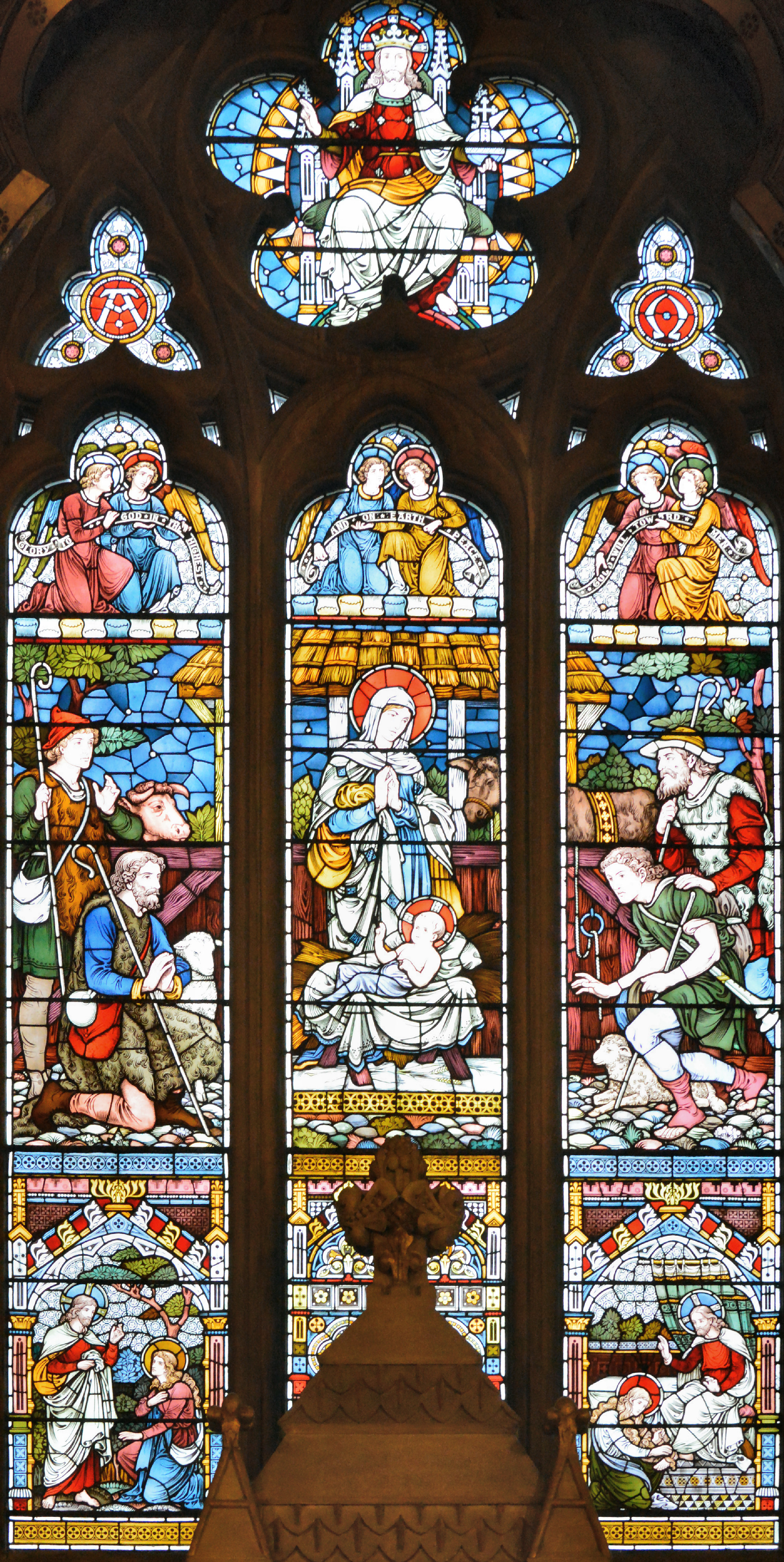
East window

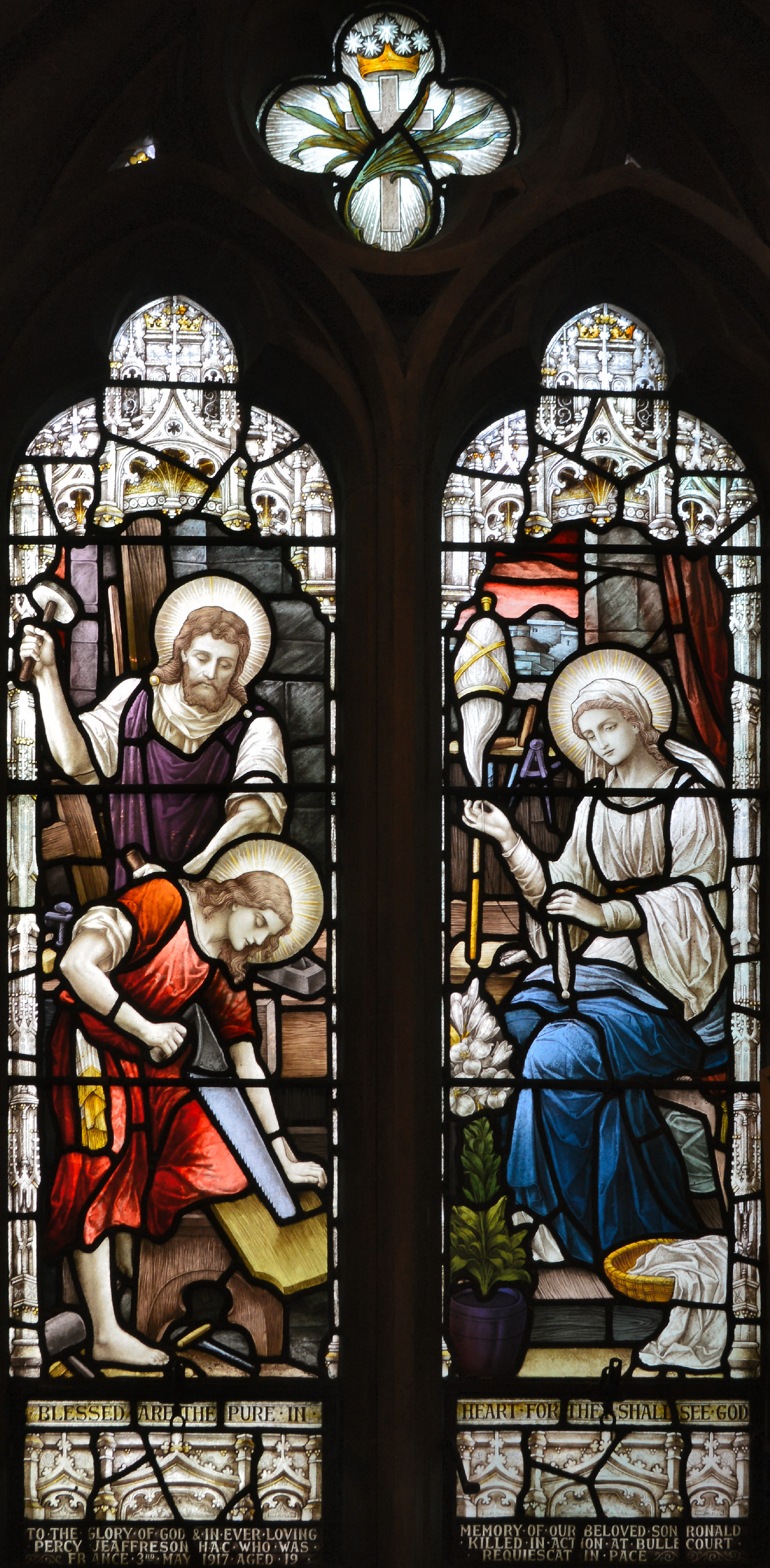
Holy Family
