= Wolds Top =

Hill in Lincolnshire, England

- Normanby Hill
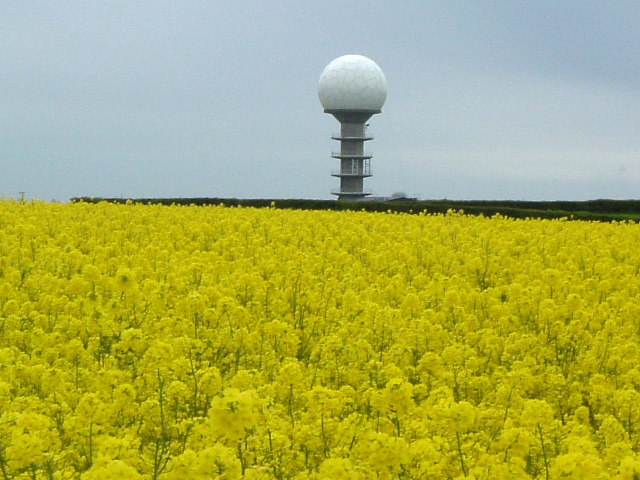
- The nearby National Air Traffic Control Radar Installation (Claxby)

Highest point
- Elevation: 168 m (551 ft)
- Prominence: 162 m (531 ft)
- Parent peak: Walton Hill
- Listing: Marilyn, County Top
- Coordinates: 53°27′09″N 0°18′48″W

Geography
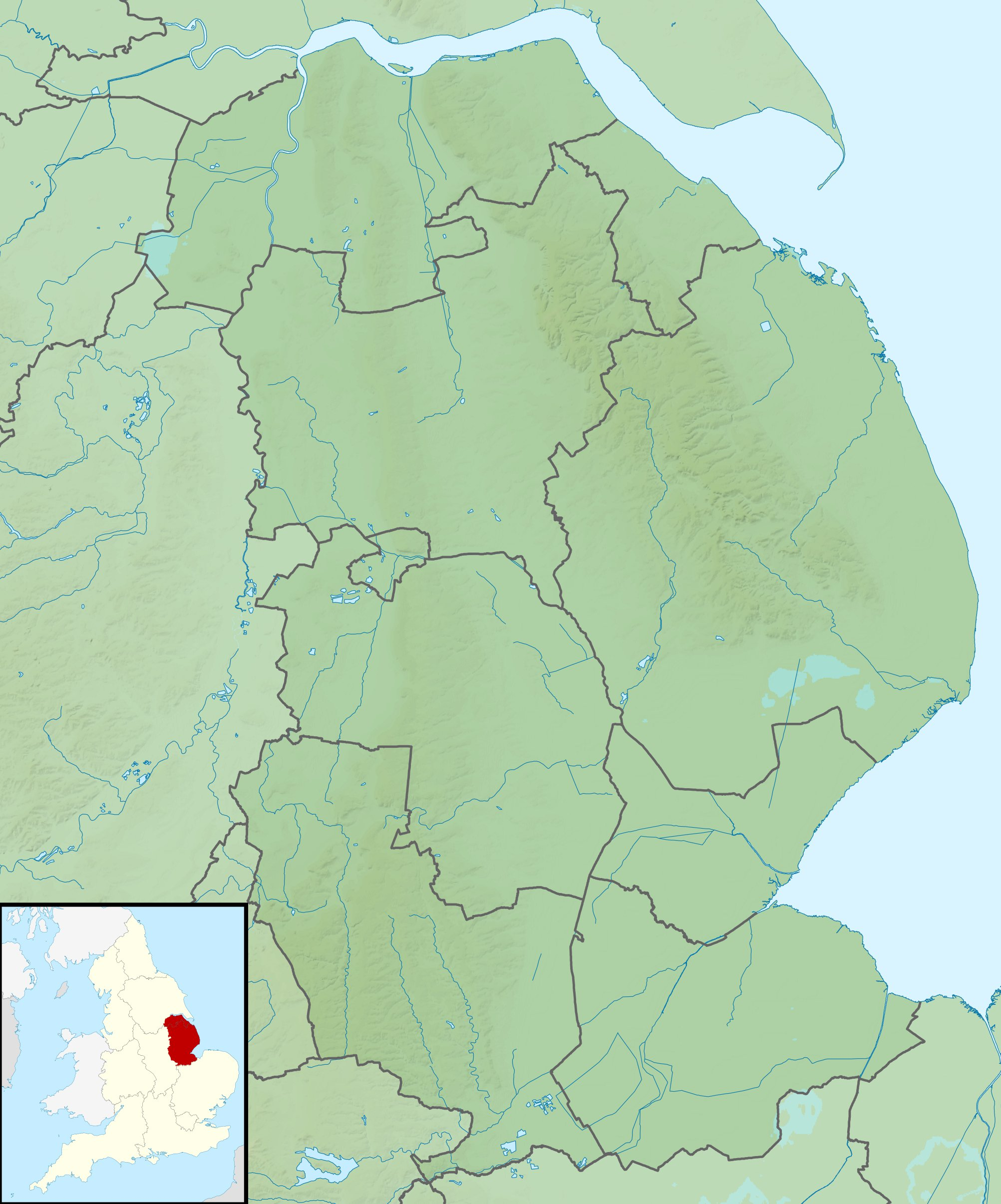
- Location within Lincolnshire
- Location: Lincolnshire Wolds, England
- OS grid: TF121964
- Topo map: OS Landranger 113

Wolds Top, also known as Normanby Hill, is the highest point of the Lincolnshire Wolds. The summit elevation is 168 m (551 ft). It lies just under a mile to the north of the village of Normanby le Wold and three miles to the south of the small market town of Caistor in Lincolnshire. The Viking Way passes close by, on a minor road, and there is a radio mast near the summit. The summit is marked with an Ordnance Survey triangulation station, colloquially known as 'The Golf Ball' due to its resemblance to a golf ball on a tee. The station was erected in 1936, and is now used as part of the Ordnance Survey National GPS System.

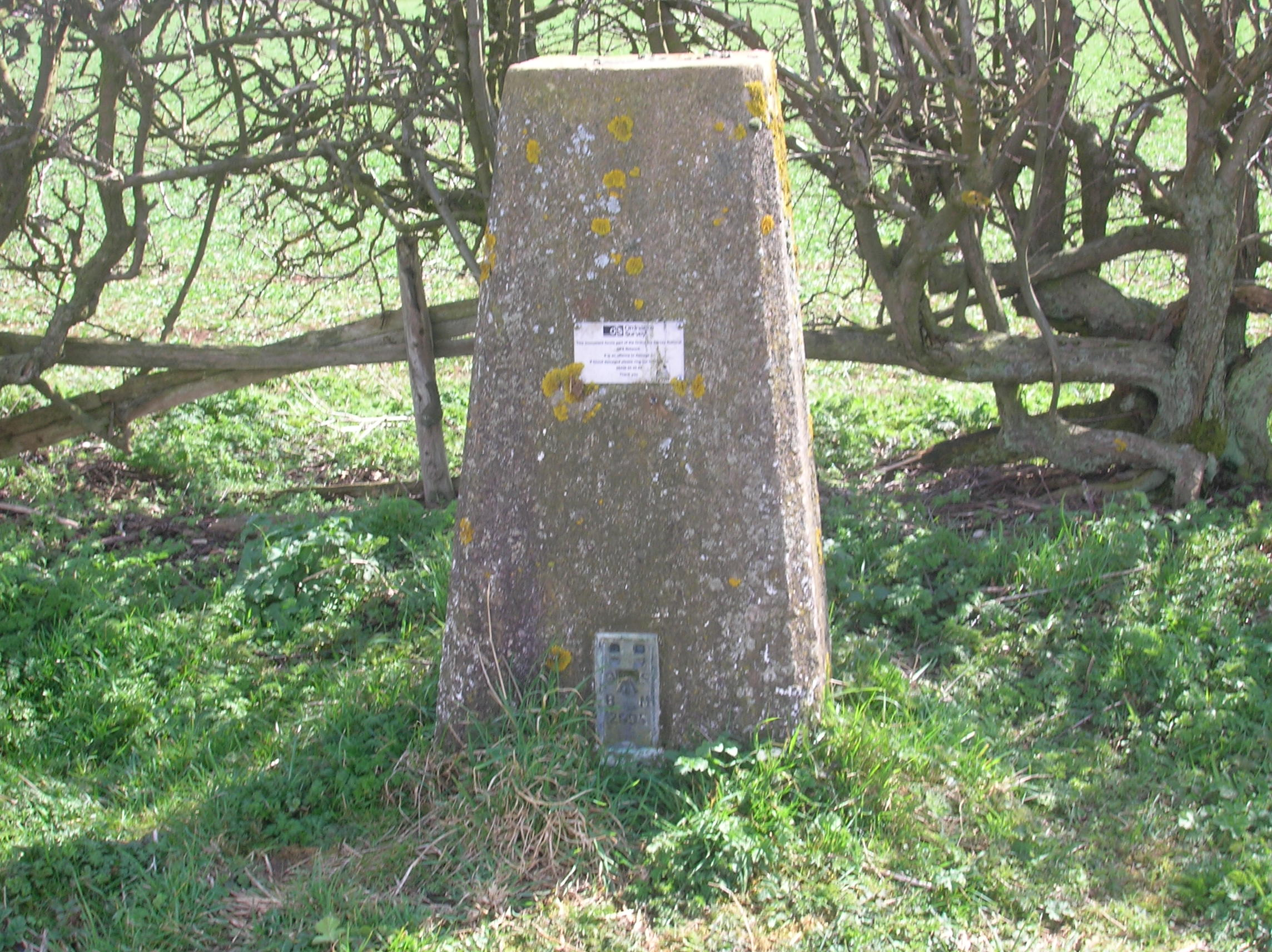
Triangulation post at Wolds Top

Wolds Top is within the Lincolnshire Wolds Area of Outstanding Natural Beauty.
