= Charles Edgar Buckeridge =

English church decorative artist

- Born: 1864
- Died: 11 May 1898 (aged 33–34)

Charles Edgar Buckeridge (1864 – 11 May 1898) was an English church decorative artist and the son of Charles Buckeridge, a Gothic Revival architect.

== Life and career ==
Born in Headington, Oxford in 1864, the son of Annie and Charles Buckeridge, a Gothic Revival architect, he trained with Burlison & Grylls, ecclesiastical decorators. He exhibited at the Royal Academy Summer Exhibition in 1882 with a painting of Hampton Court and became known for his religious works, described as a "highly esteemed painter in this field". He often painted in the style of Van Eyck.

He was employed by C. Hodgson Fowler, Arthur Blomfield, John Oldrid Scott, John Loughborough Pearson and Edmund Harold Sedding. His most important patron was George Frederick Bodley for whom he completed the decoration at St Martin-on-the-Hill, Scarborough, that had been started by Edward Burne-Jones and Morris & Co. in the 1860s.

He worked in partnership with Charles Stephen Floyce or Fleuss (c1857-1895), until the end of 1890. They advertised as 'panel and mural painters' and 'artists in stained glass'. Floyce later (1892) worked with Blomfield on the Royal Memorial Church of St George, Cannes.

Other projects included paintings (1894) for Pearson's chapel at the convent of the Society of the Holy and Undivided Trinity (now St Antony's College, Oxford); the original architect of the nunnery had been his father.

The reredos formerly in St Mark's Church, Horsham, is now in St Mary's Church. It cost about £200. "The upper part of the reredos is in the form of a triptych. The framework is of oak, and the panels, gilt and coloured, are painted in oils, the work being of the Flemish school. The centre panel represents the adoration of the infant Jesus by the Virgin and St Joseph. The side panels bear figures of the four Evangelists. Sir Arthur Blomfield was the architect, and Messrs. Floyce and Buckeridge, of London, were the artists."

At St Mary Magdalene, Enfield, he painted the East Wall and the angels on the ceiling in the chancel (1897/8).

"The altar and reredos of the church of St. Nicholas, Rodmersham, Kent, have been exquisitely painted by Messrs. Buckeridge and Floyce". "It represents the best order of ecclesiastical art, viz., the 15th Century German, whilst the character of the ornament is founded on the old Norfolk work".

His masterpiece is probably the triptych (1892–93) for the architect Norman Shaw's All Saints' Church, Richard's Castle, Shropshire.

== Personal life ==
Charles married Ellen Dunkley in Marylebone in 1888 and had one son, Albert (b 1881). In 1882 his address was given as 4, Duke Street, Portland Place and in 1891 Wilmot Place, St Pancras. He later lived at Mortimer Street, Marylebone. He died at 64 Agamemnon Road, West Hampstead in 1898, and is buried in Camden. According to Saint "In November 1894 .. his wife destroyed one of his largest paintings and fled".

== Gallery ==
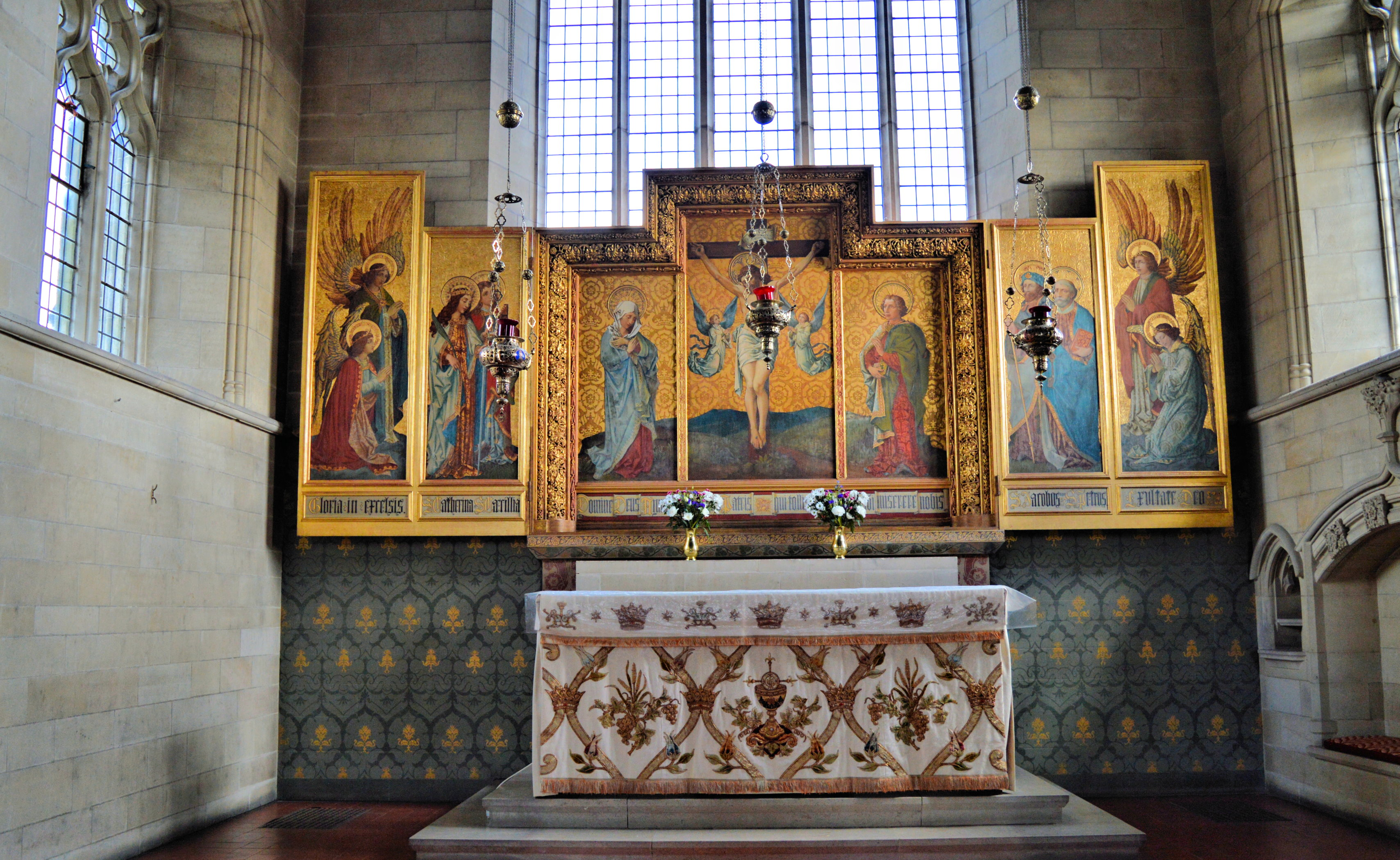
Reredos, Richard's Castle

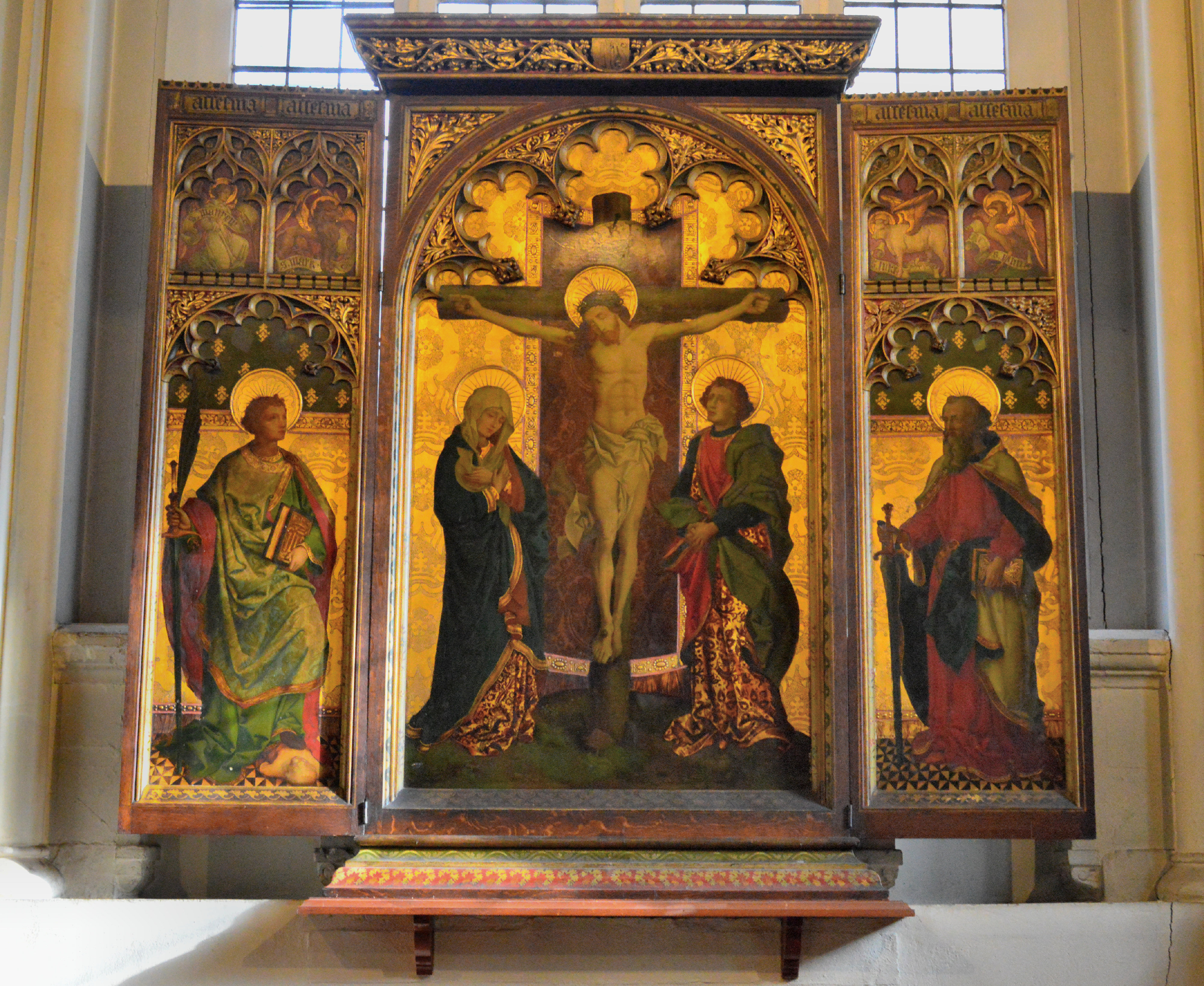
St Pancras (Old Church) Reredos

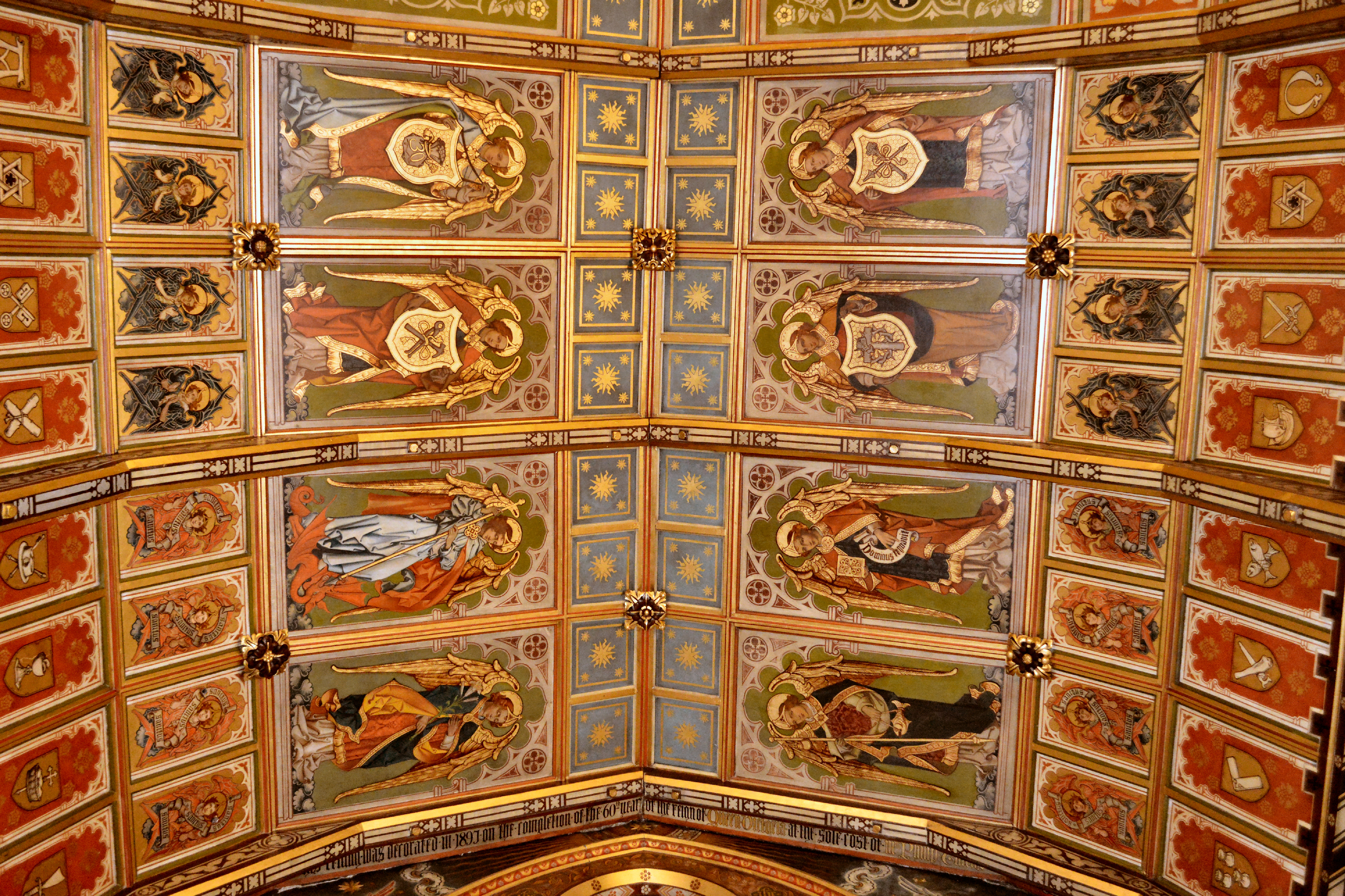
St Mary Magdalene, Enfield. The ceiling

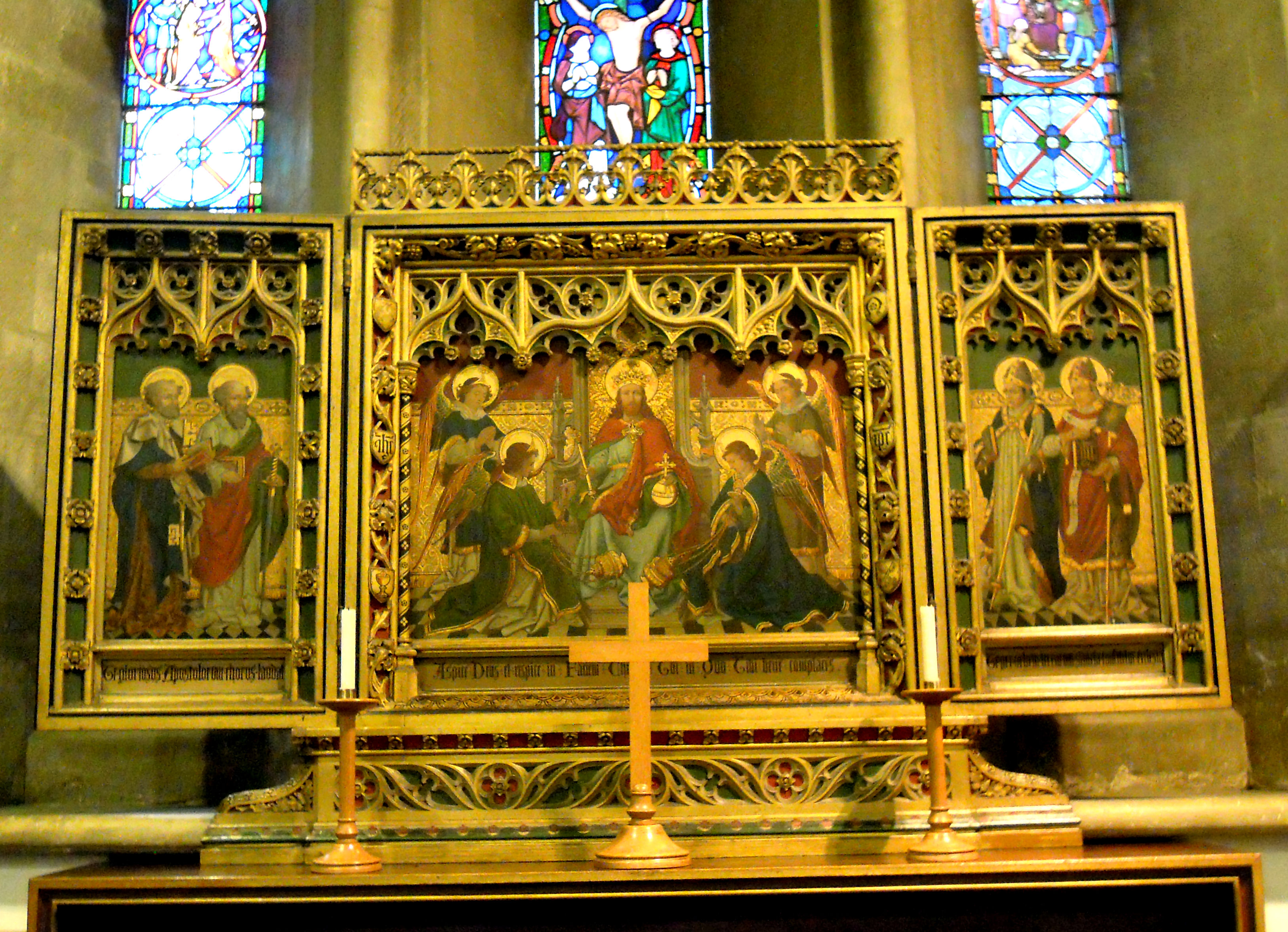
Triptych, St Katharine, Ickleford

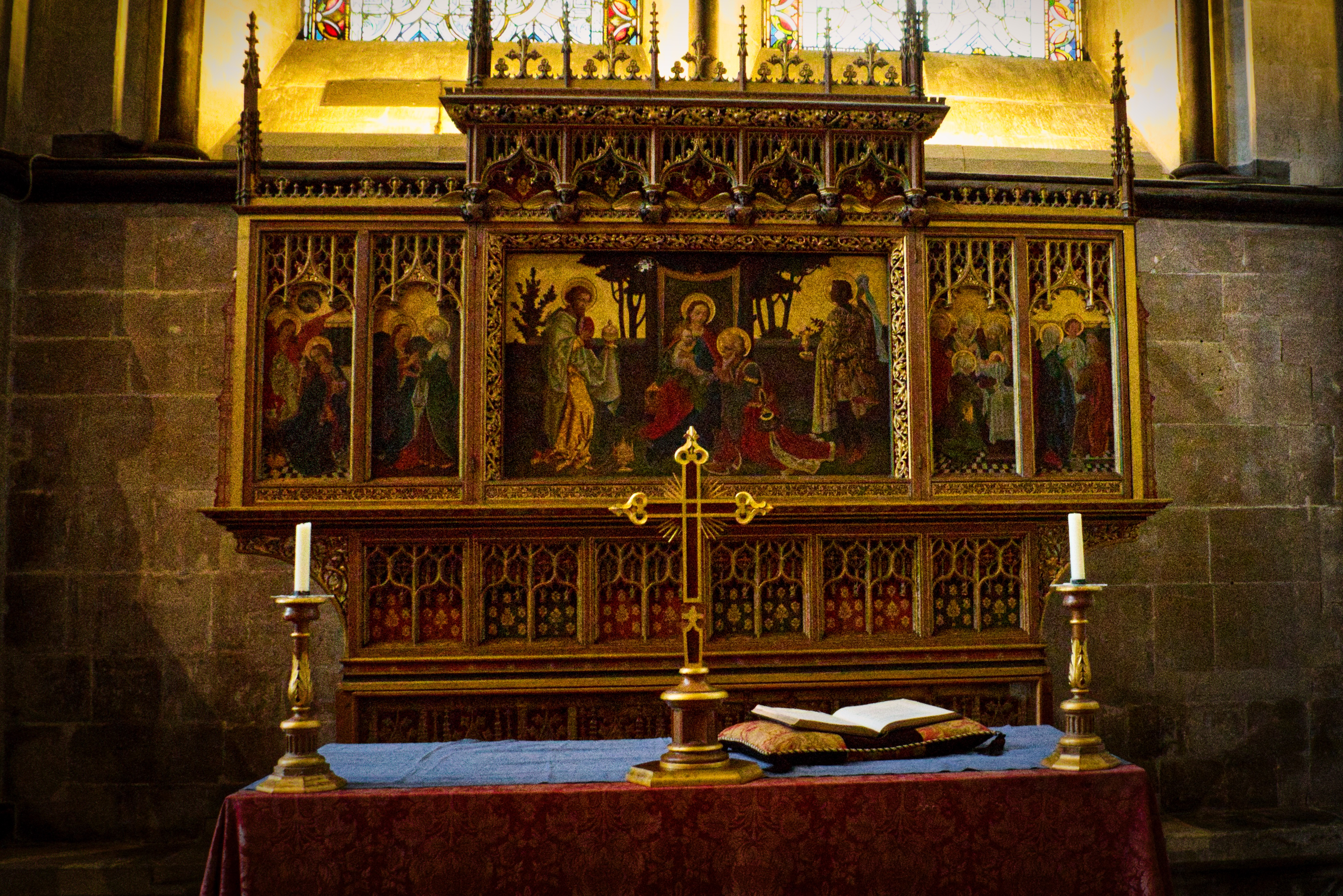
Triptych, Salisbury Cathedral

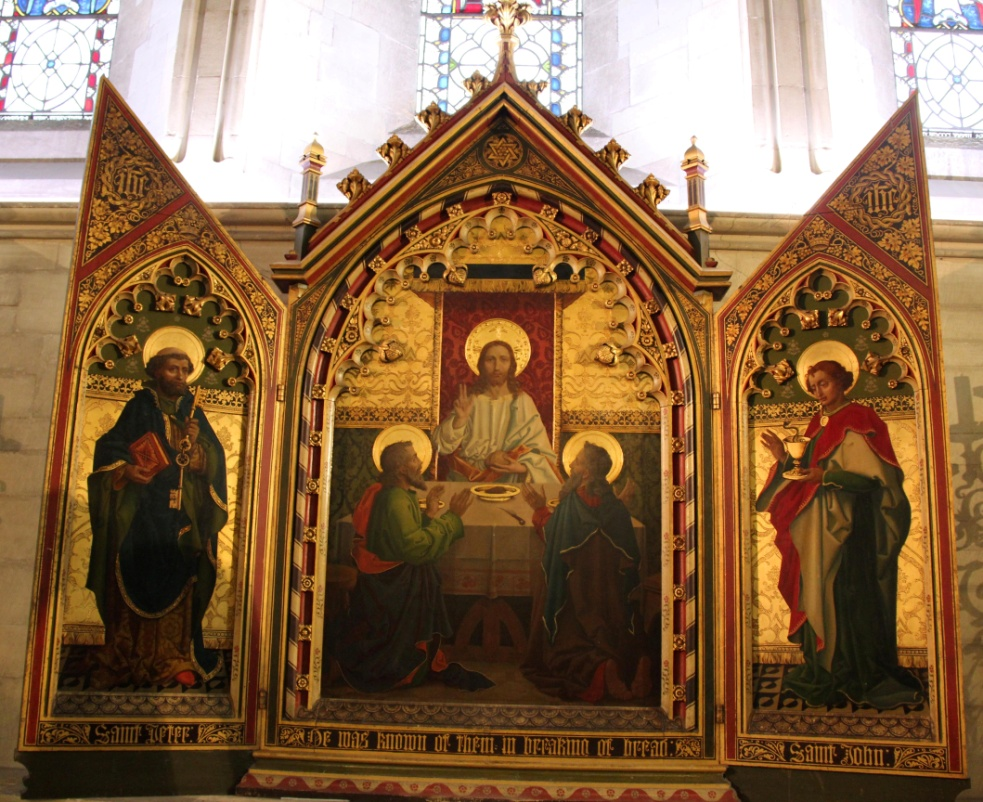
North Mundham

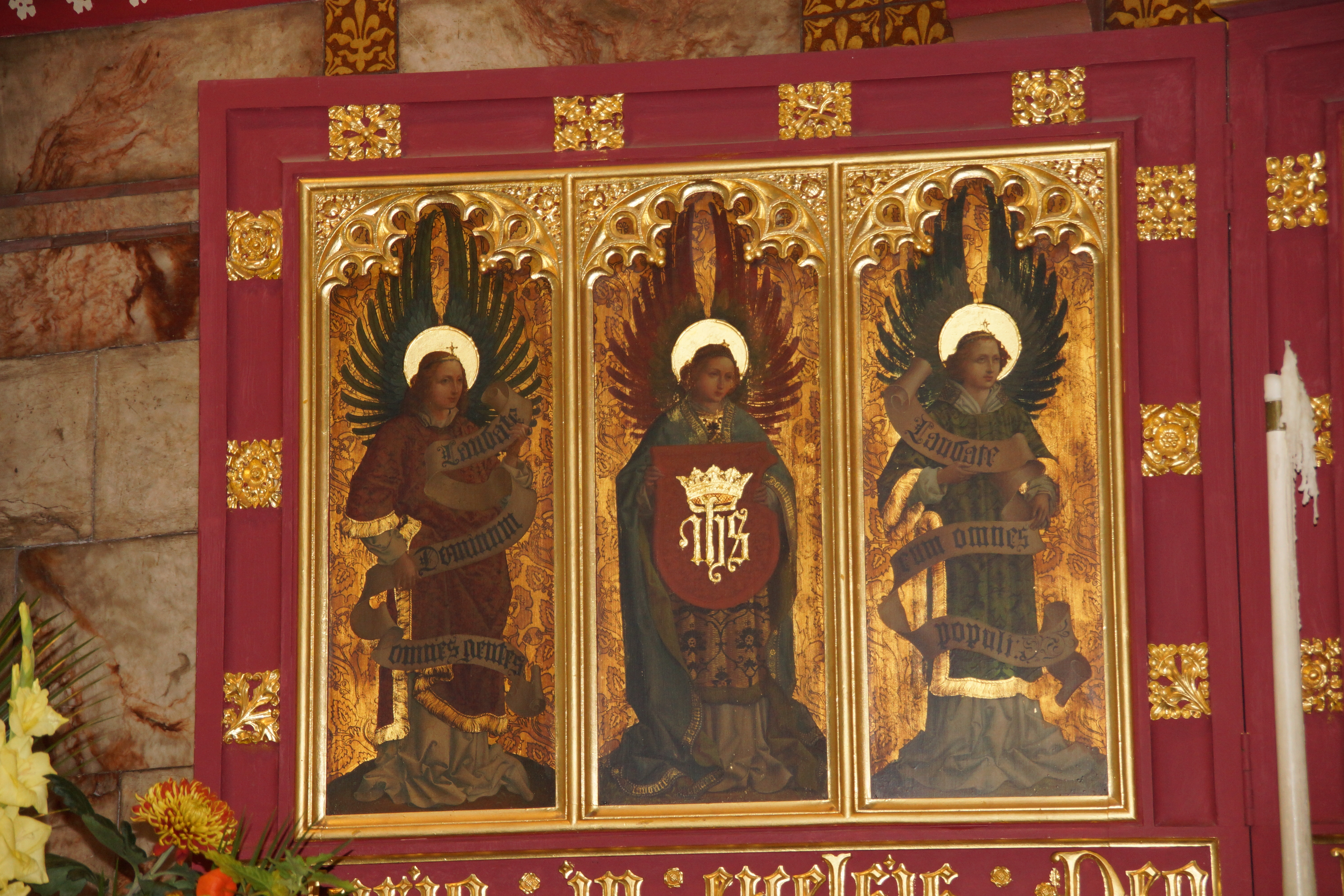
St Martin, Scarborough.
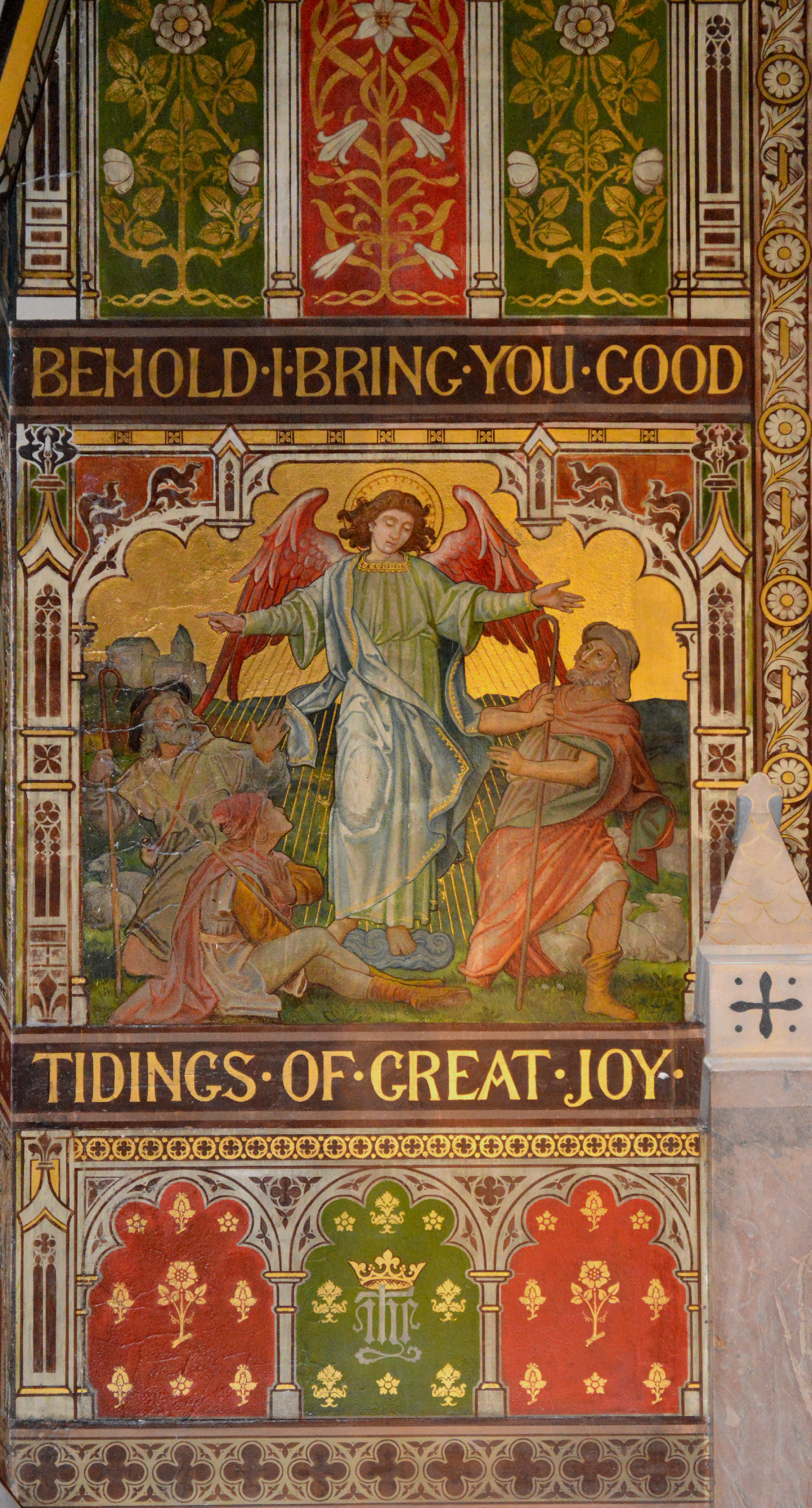
The Angel Gabriel. St Mary Magdalene, Enfield.

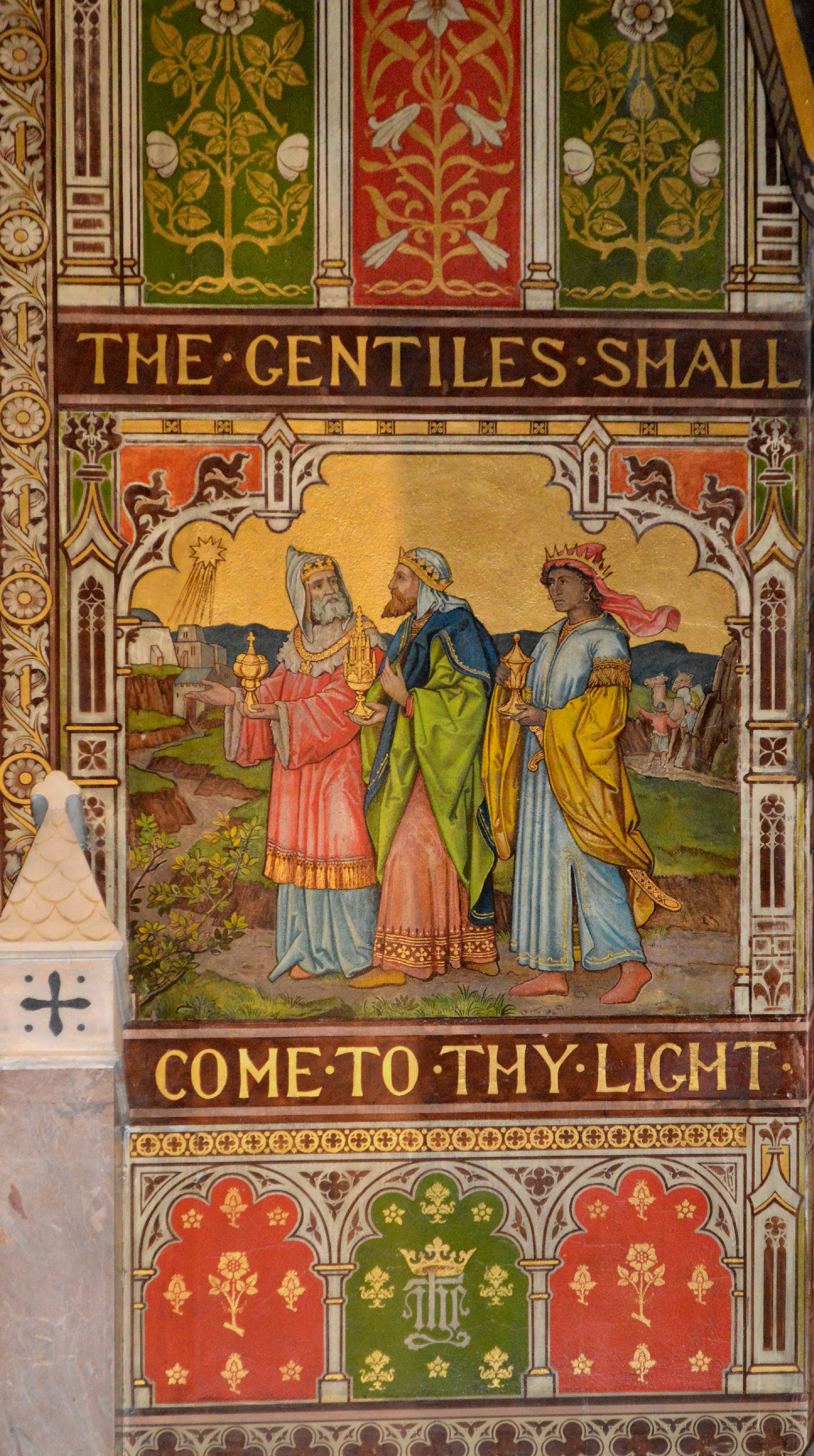
The Magi. St Mary Magdalene, Enfield.

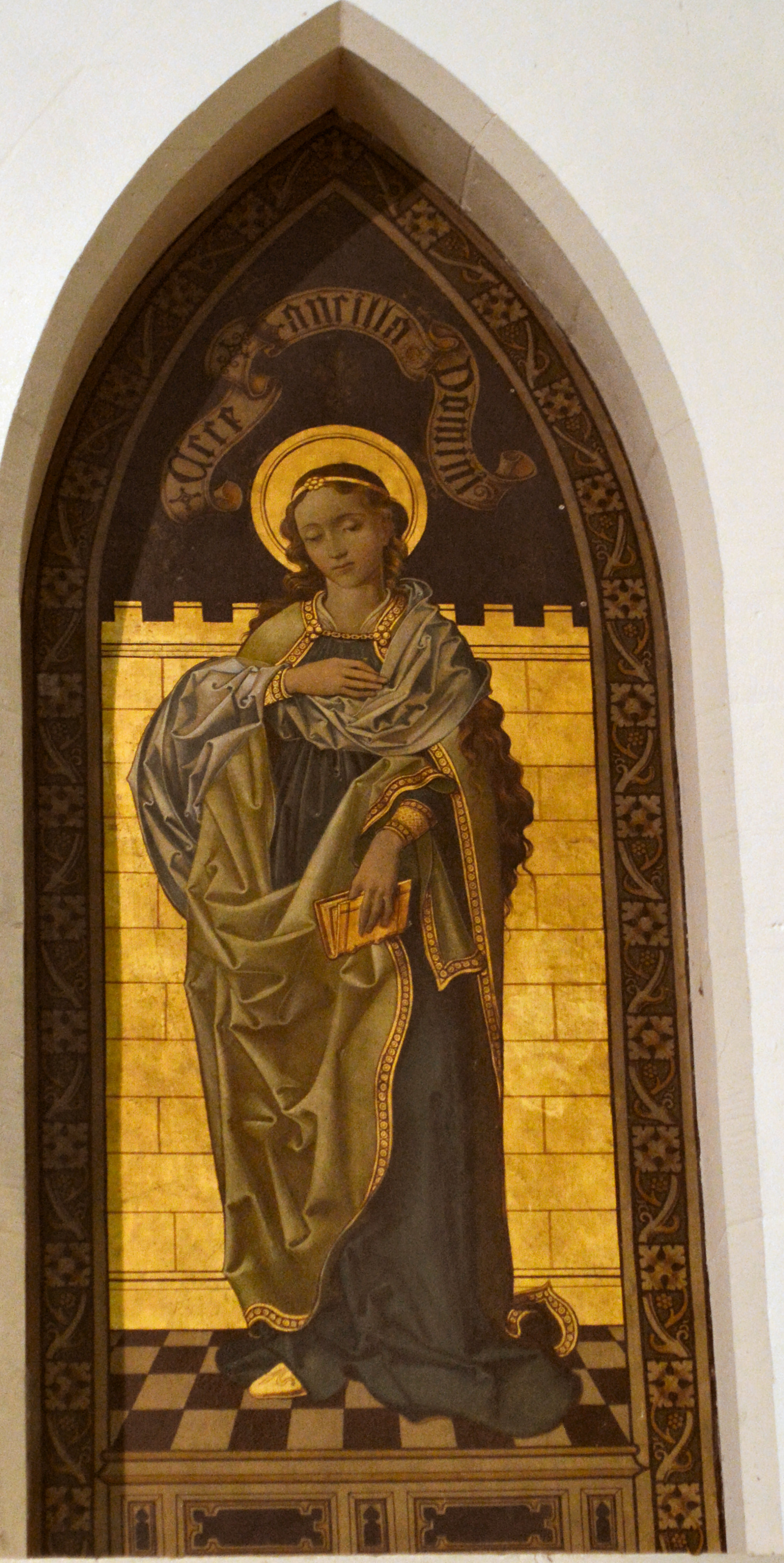
Annunciation, Leatherhead

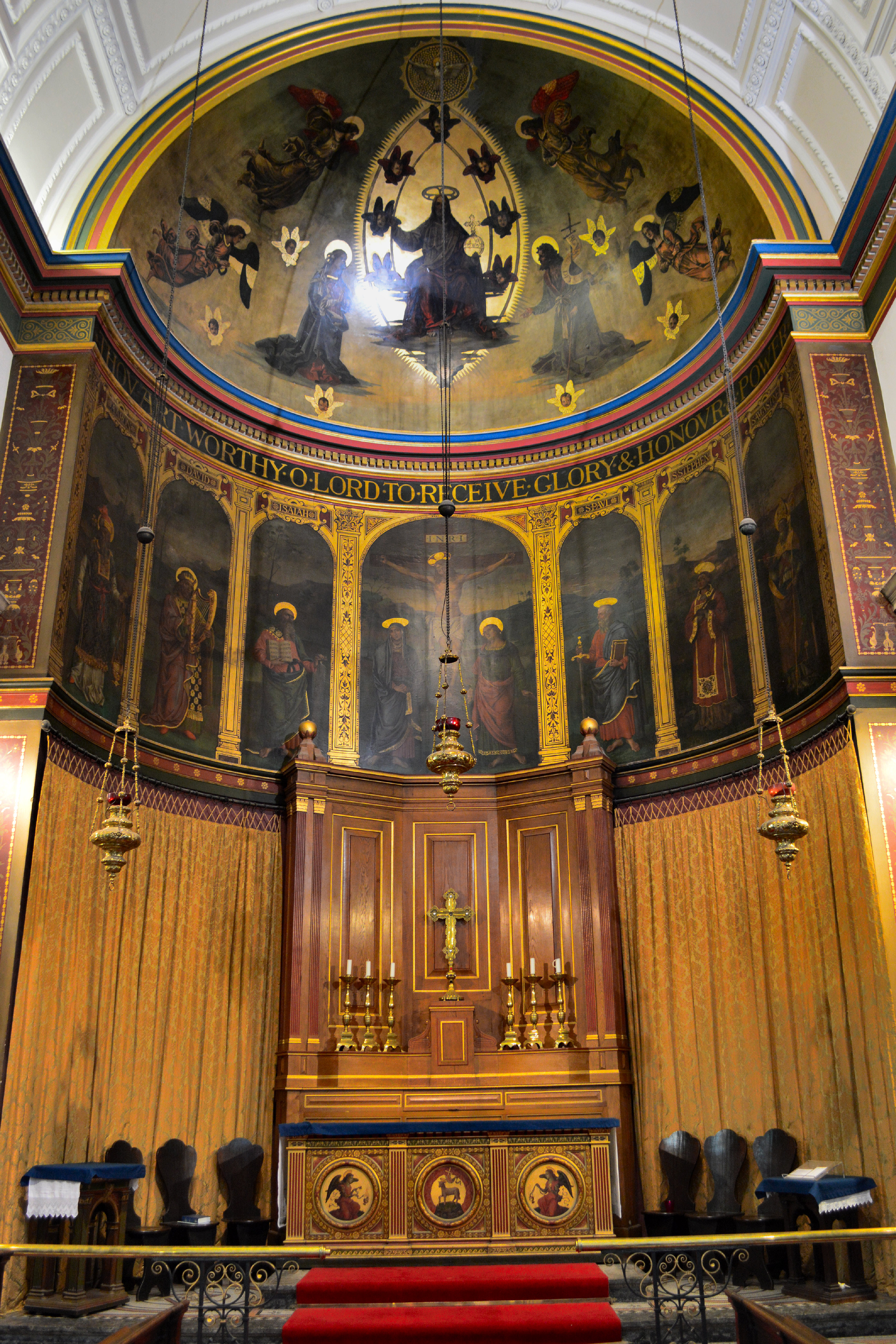
Holy Trinity Church, Guildford

== Works ==
Incomplete. (After Andrew Saint with additions)

Current Location	County	Photograph	Type	Original location	Original county	Architect	Notes
St Mary the Virgin's Church, Bromfield	Shropshire		Triptych			Hodgson Fowler, F.S.A.	"Painted in Netherlandish style" (c 1890)
St Mary's Church, Honley	West Yorkshire		Pulpit			Hodgson Fowler, F.S.A.	
Christ Church, Shieldfield, Newcastle upon Tyne	Tyne and Wear		Reredos	St Mary's Church, Barnard Castle	Durham	Hodgson Fowler, F.S.A.	1883. Replaced with panels in 1962.
St Mary's, Goldsborough	North Yorkshire		Reredos			Hodgson Fowler, F.S.A.	
St Mary's Church, Nottingham	Nottinghamshire		Reredos			G. F. Bodley, A.R.A.	1885
St Mary's Church, Claxby by Normanby.	Lincolnshire		The painting of the Annunciation. Painting in memory of Lord Burton's father	St Margaret, Burton upon Trent	Staffordshire	G. F. Bodley, A.R.A.	Demolished in 1968.
St Paul's, Burton upon Trent.	Staffordshire		painting of the Crucifixion	St Margaret, Burton upon Trent	Staffordshire	G. F. Bodley, A.R.A.	St Margarets was a "chapel-of-ease" for St Paul's Church, demolished in 1970
St Andrew's, Stainton le Vale	Lincolnshire		Painting of the Agony in the Garden	St Margaret, Burton upon Trent	Staffordshire	G. F. Bodley, A.R.A.	
St Martin's, Scarborough	North Yorkshire		Reredos			G. F. Bodley, A.R.A.	
Church of St Barnabas, Pimlico	City of Westminster, London		Three paintings in crypt			G. F. Bodley, A.R.A.	
Bovey Tracey	Devon		Doors in screen			J. D. Sedding	1887
Milstead, near Sittingbourne	Kent		Work			J. D. Sedding	
Netley, near Southampton	Hampshire		Work			J. D. Sedding	
Holy Trinity, Chelsea	Kensington and Chelsea, London		Lenten altar cloth (partial)			J. D. Sedding	
Destroyed			Large painting (altar)	St John's, Clerkenwell	Islington, London	J. O. Scott, F.S.A.	Destroyed 1941
Not Known			Reredos in side chapel	Halifax Parish Church	West Yorkshire	Burlison and Grylls	1886 Formerly in the Holdsworth Chapel. Disposed of, current location not known.
Croydon Parish Church	Croydon, London		Work, including stencilling and roof colour			Burlison and Grylls	
St Mary's Church, Portsea	Hampshire		Reredos			Sir Arthur Blomfield	Buckeridge and Floyce "its huge reredos (a masterpiece of Late Victorian ecclesiastical decoration with magnificent and amazingly richly detailed paintings by Buckeridge and Floyce) is majestic and stately"
St Stephen's Church, North Mundham	West Sussex		Triptych			Sir Arthur Blomfield	1883.
Old St Pancras Church	London		Triptych			Sir Arthur Blomfield	1888 Buckeridge and Floyce
Holy Trinity, Guildford	Surrey		Apse, altar and small table			Sir Arthur Blomfield	
Demolished			Frame only	Plaistow (St Mary)	London Borough of Newham	Sir Arthur Blomfield	Built 1890–94. Demolished in 1976. New church built in 1981
Truro Cathedral	Cornwall		Altar panels for Clayton and Bell			J. L. Pearson	1887
Durham Castle	Durham		Reredos (carved)			Hodgson Fowler, F.S.A.	
St Nicholas' church, Rodmersham, near Sittingbourne	Kent		Work on altar			Rev W Mellor	Buckeridge and Floyce
Not known			Triptych	Kennington convent, Wyndham Road	London	For sister Jane (Gibson)	Sisters Of Charity, 126, Wyndham Road, Lambeth. Demolished
St Antony's College library	Oxford		Altar front, Three panel paintings round apse of chapel	The Convent at St Giles Oxford (Holy Trinity Convent)	Oxford	For the Rev Mother	"The apse was adorned with paintings by Charles Edgar Buckeridge, the original architect's son, and Ethel King Martin; they were restored in 1996." "This entry probably refers to the altar front, painted originally for the temporary chapel. Later, Buckeridge added three of the panel paintings round the apse of the chapel". "At Holy Trinity Convent he painted the front of the main altar (now at Malvern) and two of the side panels." The location of the altar front is now not known. It might originally have been moved to the Convent of the Holy Name, Malvern Link, in 1946, but that closed in 1990.
St Peter's, Wolferton	Norfolk		The Wolferton Triptych			Sir Arthur Blomfield	
Grahamstown Cathedral	South Africa		Two-light memorial window				West End of North Aisle. "Depicts Our Lord and His disciples at the Sea of Galilee. Made by Messrs Buckeridge and Floyce of London. In memory of Revd Charles Frederick Overton, Incumbent of St George’s after the death of Dean Williams."
St Bartholomew, Alice (?)	South Africa		Lancet memorial window				
Garrison Church of St Peter and St Paul, Shoeburyness	Essex		Decoration			For Revd. Malin, Chaplain	See postcard. Closed 1987 and sold in 2018
Not Known			Large mural painting	St Thomas's Convent Chapel (Osney House), Oxford	Oxfordshire		destroyed?
Woburn Sands Church	Bedfordshire		Reredos				"The centre panel depicts the Lord, after His resurrection, appearing to St. Mary Magdalene in the garden, the two angels being seen at the tomb in the background. The painting is in the style of the Flemish or German School, and is excellent example of the characteristics of that school. It is executed by Mr. Buckeridge, London, the whole design being that of Sir A. Blomfield."
Destroyed			Reredos	St Giles Cripplegate	London		. Destroyed 1940.
St Mary Magdalene, Enfield	London		Decorative work to roof				see above
All Saints' Church, Richard's Castle	Shropshire		Reredos			Norman Shaw	Also "decorations of east wall"
Salisbury Cathedral	Wiltshire		Reredos in Lady Chapel			Sir Arthur Blomfield	1896. In North Transept Bay.
St Matthew's Church, Northampton	Northamptonshire		Triptych in Lady Chapel				
St Mary the Virgin, Headley	Surrey		Triptych				1895
St Mary's Church, Horsham	West Sussex		Reredos	St Mark's, Horsham	West Sussex	Sir Arthur Blomfield	
Church of St Mary & St Nicholas, Leatherhead	Surrey		Two frescoes either side of the chancel arch			Sir Arthur Blomfield	1894. Messrs Buckeridge and Floyce of Mortimer Street.
Church of St Katharine, Ickleford	Hertfordshire		Triptych				
Not Known			Window in memory of Isabella Caroline Francis	St Edmund's Church, Northampton	Northamptonshire		1892. Demolished c1980 and windows disposed of.
St Paul's Church, Knowbury	Shropshire		Reredos				c1884
