= Miles Cross Hill =

Coordinates: 53.248°N 0.148°E

Miles Cross Hill is a large hill that is the sloping gradient up to the landscape of the Lincolnshire Wolds. As it is the first large hill of the Wolds, there are views of the Lincolnshire Fens and Coast. The hill leads to Ulceby Cross Roundabout.
