= Stainton le Vale =

Village in Lincolnshire, England

Coordinates: 53.431925°N 0.234285°W

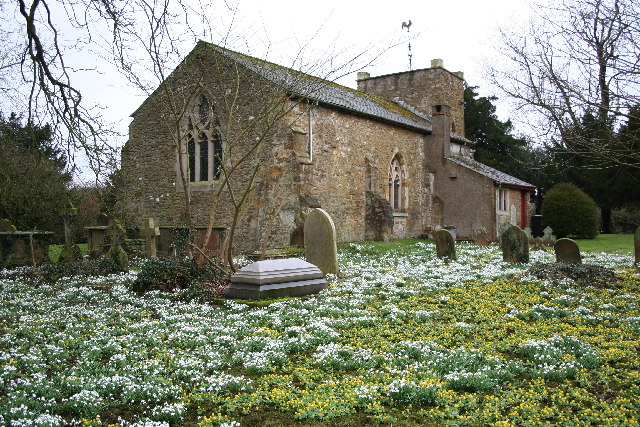
- St Andrew's Church, Stainton le Vale

- Location within Lincolnshire
- OS grid reference: TF174942
  - London: 140 mi (230 km) S
- Civil parish: Thoresway
- District: West Lindsey
- Shire county: Lincolnshire
- Region: East Midlands
- Country: England
- Sovereign state: United Kingdom
- Post town: Market Rasen
- Postcode district: LN8
- Police: Lincolnshire
- Fire: Lincolnshire
- Ambulance: East Midlands
- UK Parliament: Gainsborough

Stainton le Vale is a village in the civil parish of Thoresway in the West Lindsey district of Lincolnshire, England. It is situated about 6 miles (9.7 km) north-east from the town of Market Rasen and about 6 miles south-east from the town of Caistor. It is a former civil parish and lies in the Lincolnshire Wolds, a designated Area of Outstanding Natural Beauty.

In the 1086 Domesday Book it is named "Staintone", with 39 households, land and a mill.

The parish church is a Grade II listed building dedicated to Saint Andrew and dating from 1300. It was restored in 1886, and again in 1914 after falling into ruin in the 17th century. The painting of the Agony in the Garden by Charles Edgar Buckeridge was originally in St Margaret's Church, Burton upon Trent.

Stainton le Vale CE School was recognised as a Church of England public elementary school in 1873; it appears to have closed in the summer of 1934.
