= Kirmond le Mire =

Village in Lincolnshire, England

Coordinates: 53.416830°N 0.21107°W

- Location within Lincolnshire
- OS grid reference: TF189926
  - London: 135 mi (217 km) S
- District: West Lindsey
- Shire county: Lincolnshire
- Region: East Midlands
- Country: England
- Sovereign state: United Kingdom
- Post town: Market Rasen
- Postcode district: LN8
- Police: Lincolnshire
- Fire: Lincolnshire
- Ambulance: East Midlands
- UK Parliament: Gainsborough

Kirmond le Mire is a small village and civil parish in the West Lindsey district of Lincolnshire, England. It is situated on the B1203 road, 6 miles (10 km) east from Market Rasen and 11 miles (18 km) south-west from Grimsby. It is in the civil parish of Thoresway.

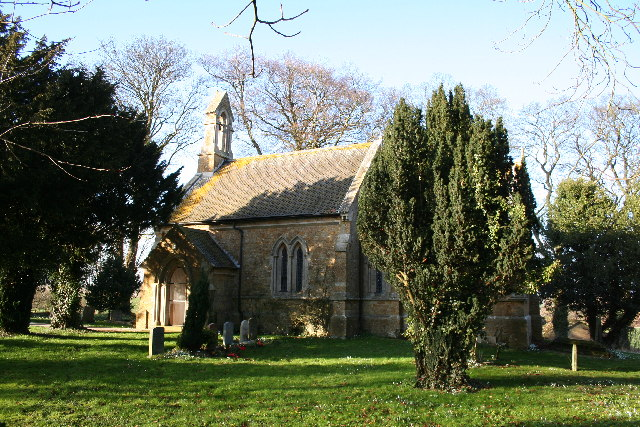
St Martin's church, Kirmond le Mire

Kirmond le Mire Grade II listed Anglican church, built in 1847, is dedicated to St Martin.

The parish includes the lost Medieval settlement of Beckfield.

The village's name dates to at least 1086, soon after the Norman Conquest of England. It is seen in the earliest historical documents as Chevremont-le-myrr, and in some later documents as Kevermond.
