= Lincolnshire Wolds =

Hill range in Lincolnshire

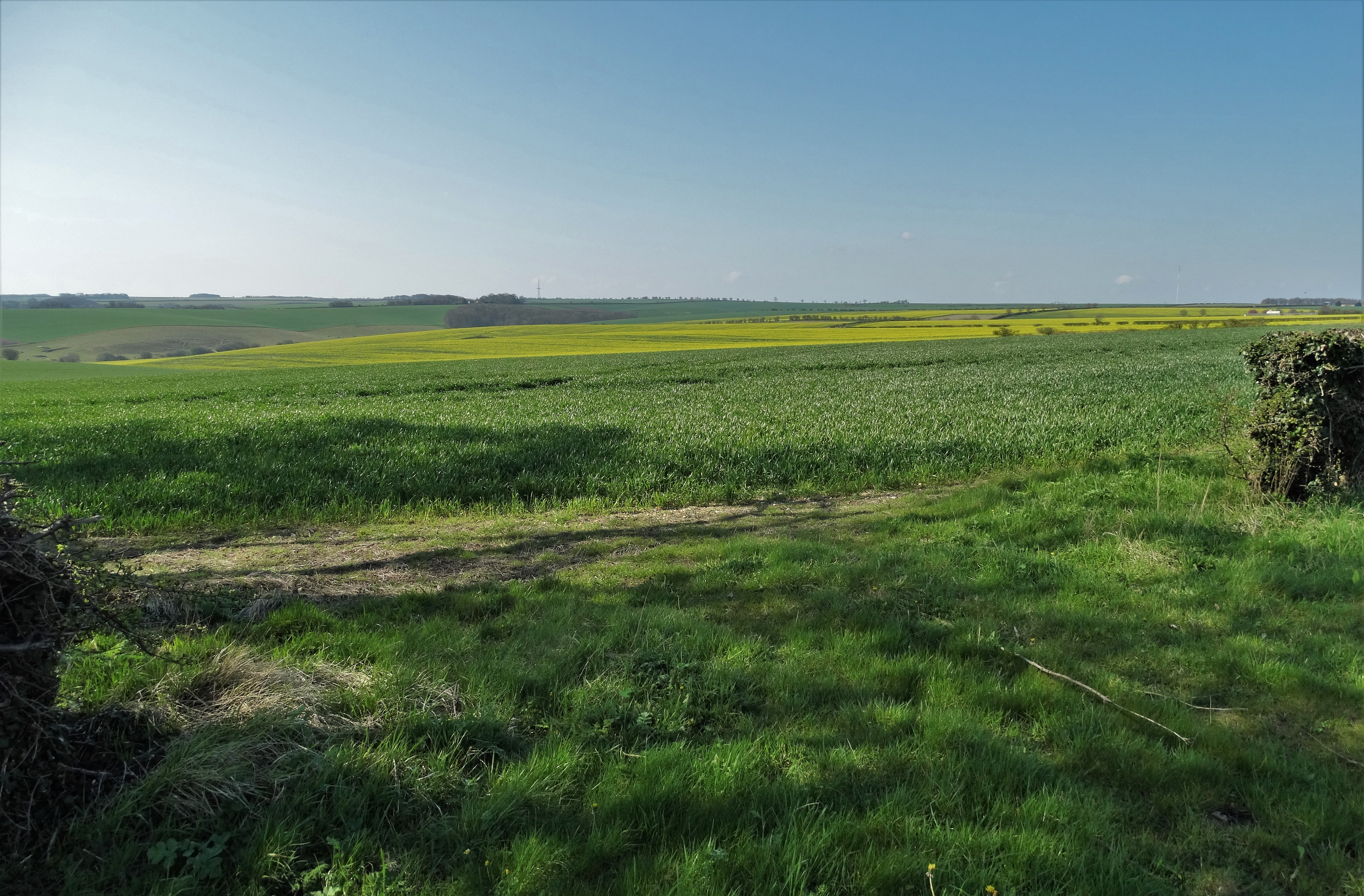
- The Lincolnshire Wolds near Welton le Wold (top), location within Lincolnshire (bottom)
- Interactive map of Lincolnshire Wolds
- Location: Lincolnshire; North East Lincolnshire; North Lincolnshire
- Nearest city: Lincoln
- Coordinates: 53°21′0″N 0°6′0″W
- Area: 560 km^{2} (220 sq mi)
- Established: 1973
- Governing body: Lincolnshire Wolds Countryside Service

The Lincolnshire Wolds are a range of low hills in Lincolnshire, England. The hills run roughly parallel with the North Sea coast, from the Humber Estuary just west of the town of Barton-upon-Humber in North Lincolnshire, towards the flat Lincolnshire Fens in the south-east of the county as far south as the East Lindsey village of East Keal. The Wolds form the highest land in eastern England between Yorkshire and Kent.

Natural England define a Lincolnshire Wolds National Character Area covering an area of 844 square kilometres (326 sq mi). Within this, an area of 560 square kilometres (220 sq mi) is designated as the Lincolnshire Wolds National Landscape, an Area of Outstanding Natural Beauty (AONB).

== Geology ==
The Wolds are formed largely from a series of pure marine limestones formed during the Cretaceous period, known collectively as the Chalk Group. The chalk overlies a series of other sedimentary strata of late Jurassic/early Cretaceous age. The strata dip gently to the east and form a scarp which runs southeast from the south bank of the Humber just west of the small town of Barton upon Humber via Caistor before it loses its identity just south of the small town of Spilsby. To the north of the Humber Gap, the same formations continue as the Yorkshire Wolds. The rock succession in stratigraphic order i.e. youngest/uppermost first, is this:

- White Chalk Subgroup
  - Burnham Chalk formation
  - Welton Chalk Formation
- Grey Chalk Subgroup
  - Ferriby Chalk Formation
  - Hunstanton Chalk Formation

The thin Hunstanton Chalk and the Ferriby Chalk formations form much of the west facing Wolds scarp but it is the overlying Welton Chalk Formation which forms the greater part of the easterly dip-slopes with the Ferriby Chalk extensively exposed within the dry dip-slope valleys. The Burnham Chalk Formation forms an indistinct secondary scarp to the east of the main scarp between Barton and Louth. In the north between South Ferriby and Grasby, the lower part of the scarp is formed from the Kimmeridge Clay Formation. A series of other rock layers intervene from the Caistor area southwards, uppermost of which are the green-brown Carstones:

Lower/early Cretaceous

- Carstone Formation (sandstone)
- Roach Formation (interbedded mudstone and limestone) (present from Stenigot southwards)
- Tealby Formation (mudstone - but including the 'Tealby Limestone Member')
- Claxby Ironstone Formation

Upper/late Jurassic

- Spilsby Sandstone Formation
- Kimmeridge Clay Formation

The numerous dry valleys cut into the dip-slope are typically floored by head, locally derived clay, silt, sand and gravel. The western valleys were created during recent glacial periods through the action of water over frozen ground whilst many in the east represent subglacial drainage. During the last ice age (Devensian), ice encroached upon the Wolds from the northeast and entered the Humber gap from the east but did not cover the Wolds, hence there is no Devensian age glacial till on these hills. However, an earlier ice age left extensive spreads of till across the central and southern areas. Sections of the main scarp, notably at Saxby All Saints and between Nettleton and Walesby have been subject to landslip.

== Geography ==
The Wolds comprise a series of low hills incised by characteristic dry open valleys.

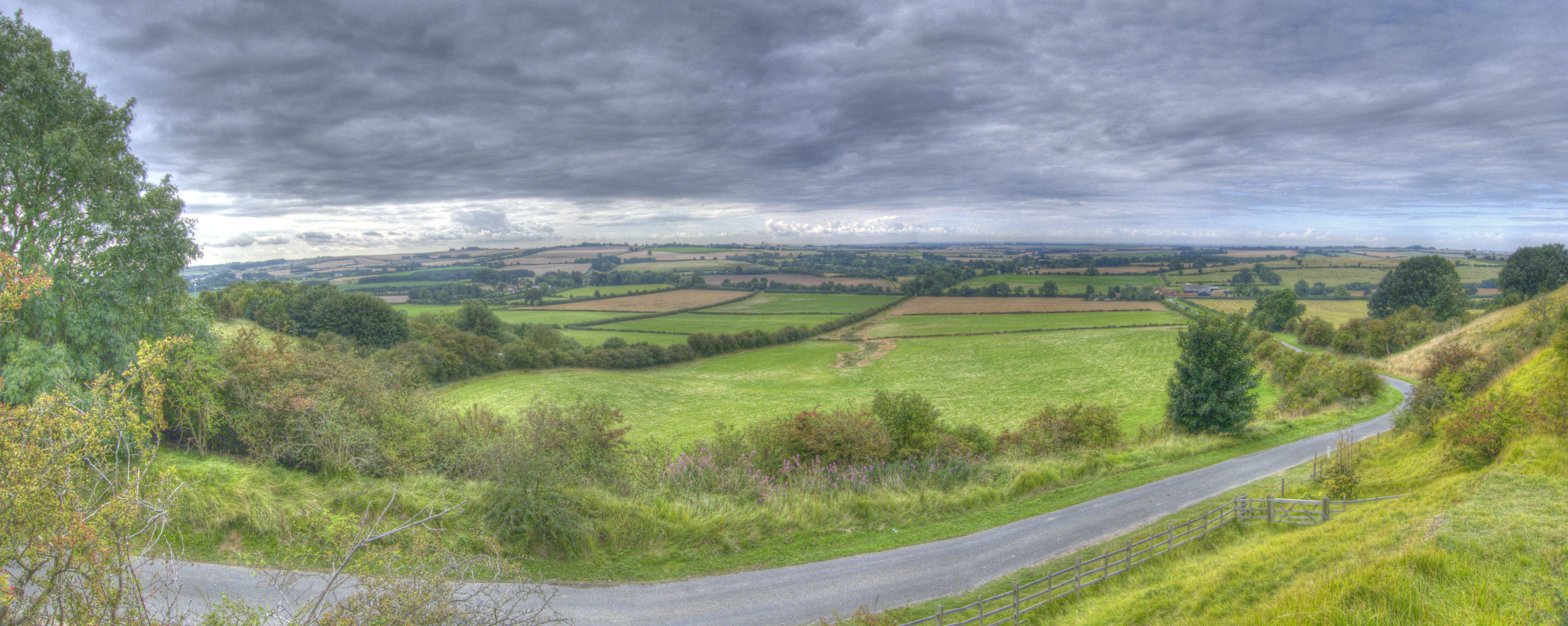
View from Red Hill in August

The Lincolnshire Wolds can be divided into four distinct areas:

1. the main area of chalk hills in the north,
2. the north west scarp,
3. an area of ridges and valleys in the south west,
4. the claylands in the south east.

The Red Hill nature reserve near the village of Goulceby is notable for the unusual red colour of its soil and underlying chalk.

The Wolds provide views across the flat Fens and salt marshes of Lindsey and Holland: it is possible, from various points on the Wolds, to see all of the larger structures in the north and east of the county: the Belmont mast, Boston Stump, Grimsby Dock Tower, the Humber Bridge, Lincoln Cathedral, St James' Church in Louth (known locally as the 'Cathedral of the Wolds', though it holds only parish church status), the radar station near Normanby, Tattershall Castle and the wind turbines on the coast near Mablethorpe.

=== Hills ===
Wolds Top is the highest point in the whole of Lincolnshire and is marked by a trig point just north of the village of Normanby le Wold, at approximately 551 feet (168 metres) above sea level (TF121964).

Other hills include:

- Castcliffe Hill - TF301735 - 456 feet (139 m)
- Gaumer Hill - TF289778 - 423 feet (129 m)
- Hoe Hill - TF308731 - 417 feet (127 m)
- Meagram Top - TF392789 - 190 feet (58 m)
- Miles Cross Hill
- Tetford Hill - TF326761 - 466 feet (142 m)
- Warden Hill - TF347737 - 371 feet (113 m)

Hills within the National Landscape with more than 30 metres of topographic prominence are:

Hill	Height	Prominence	Grid reference
Wolds Top	168 m (551 ft)	162 m	TF121964
Pewlade Hill	152.2 m (499 ft)	36 m	TF254827
Flint Hill	141.5 m (464 ft)	42 m	TF278765
Castcliffe Hill	139 m (456 ft)	57 m	TF301734
Park Hill	139 m (456 ft)	31 m	TF289767
Warden Hill	113 m (371 ft)	67 m	TF346736
Spellow Hills	103.2 m (339 ft)	56 m	TF405728

=== Waterways ===
Name	Length	Source	Source Elevation (m)	Mouth	Mouth Elevation (m)	Notes
River Bain		Ludford	130	River Witham, Dogdyke	2	Partly concurrent with the Horncastle Canal south of Horncastle.
Great Eau				North Sea, Saltfleet Haven	0	
River Lud				North Sea, North Coates	0	Also known as the Louth Navigation due to its canalisation.
River Lymn		Belchford	91	North Sea, Gibraltar Point	0	
River Rase		Tealby	118	River Ancholme, Bishopbridge	6	
River Waring		Belchford	100	River Bain, Horncastle	28	

== National Landscape ==
The Lincolnshire Wolds were designated an Area of Outstanding Natural Beauty (AONB) in 1973, and adopted the "National Landscape" branding in 2023. The Wolds AONB covers 560 square kilometres, and is managed by the Lincolnshire Wolds Countryside Service.

The Wolds AONB cuts across the council boundaries of Lincolnshire County Council, East Lindsey District Council, West Lindsey District Council and North East Lincolnshire Council. The boundaries of the AONB are marked by tourist signs incorporating stylized hills and trees, placed on roads leading into the area.

== People and places ==
The Wolds are sparsely populated and have a rural character. They are 'ringed' by several small market towns that lie around their edge:

- Alford
- Horncastle, billed on tourist signs as the "gateway to the Wolds", lies just outside the south end of the AONB
- Louth
- Market Rasen
- Caistor
- Spilsby

Many of the place-names in the Wolds indicate a strong Viking influence in the area's history. There is also an abundance of mediaeval 'lost villages' – settlements abandoned due to changes in land use, soil exhaustion and disease.

Several notable roads and paths run over the Wolds. Caistor High Street, the path of a Roman road and now the route of the B1225, runs from Caistor to Baumber near Horncastle. The ancient Bluestone Heath Road follows the course of an ancient drove road from west to east across the Wolds, and several "A" roads also run through the AONB.

The Wolds are now promoted as a tourist destination: the area's connection with Tennyson (who was born in Somersby) is being exploited, and farmers are being encouraged to diversify into the tourism industry. The roads of the Wolds are particularly popular with motorcyclists, and the area is home to Cadwell Park, one of the UK's top race circuits.

The area is also popular with walkers: the Viking Way long-distance footpath runs from Barton-upon-Humber in North Lincolnshire across the Lincolnshire Wolds and into Rutland, and there is a youth hostel in the middle of the Wolds at Woody's Top near the village of Tetford.
