= Thoresway =

Village and civil parish in the West Lindsey district of Lincolnshire, England

Coordinates: 53.453846°N 0.242576°W

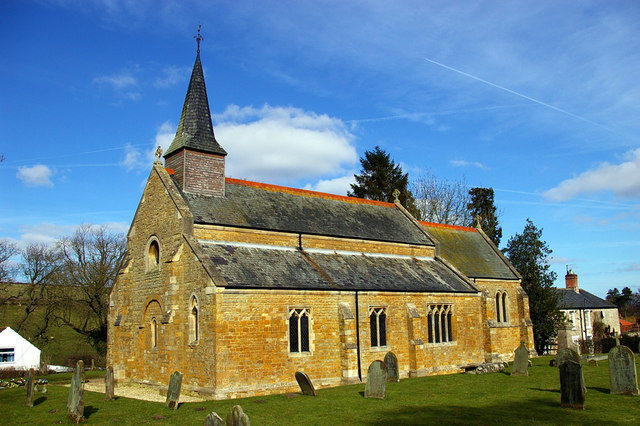
- St Mary's Church, Thoresway

- Location within Lincolnshire
- Population: 198 (2011)
- OS grid reference: TF167966
  - London: 140 mi (230 km) S
- District: West Lindsey
- Shire county: Lincolnshire
- Region: East Midlands
- Country: England
- Sovereign state: United Kingdom
- Post town: Market Rasen
- Postcode district: LN8
- Police: Lincolnshire
- Fire: Lincolnshire
- Ambulance: East Midlands
- UK Parliament: Gainsborough

Thoresway is a village and civil parish in the West Lindsey district of Lincolnshire, England. It is 1.5 miles (2.4 km) west from the B1225 road, 4 miles (6.4 km) southeast from Caistor and 6 miles (10 km) north-east from Market Rasen. The population (including Kirmond le Mire and Stainton le Vale) was 198 at the 2011 census.

Thoresway is recorded in Domesday Book as "Toreswe", and listed as having 62 households and two mills. In an 1187 Gilbertine charter it was listed as "Toresweie". The name may derive from:-

- Old Norse Þórirs vegr = "way of a Viking called Thórir", or
- Old Norse Þórs væ = "temple of the god Thor".

The parish church is a Grade II listed building dedicated to Saint Mary and dating from the 12th century, although it was largely rebuilt between 1879 and 1886 by James Fowler of Louth. It was built of ironstone and limestone and has a 12th-century font.

Also in the village is a Grade II listed, 1816 watermill.
