= Walesby, Lincolnshire =

Village and civil parish in the West Lindsey district of Lincolnshire, England

Coordinates: 53.4161°N 0.2956°W

Walesby
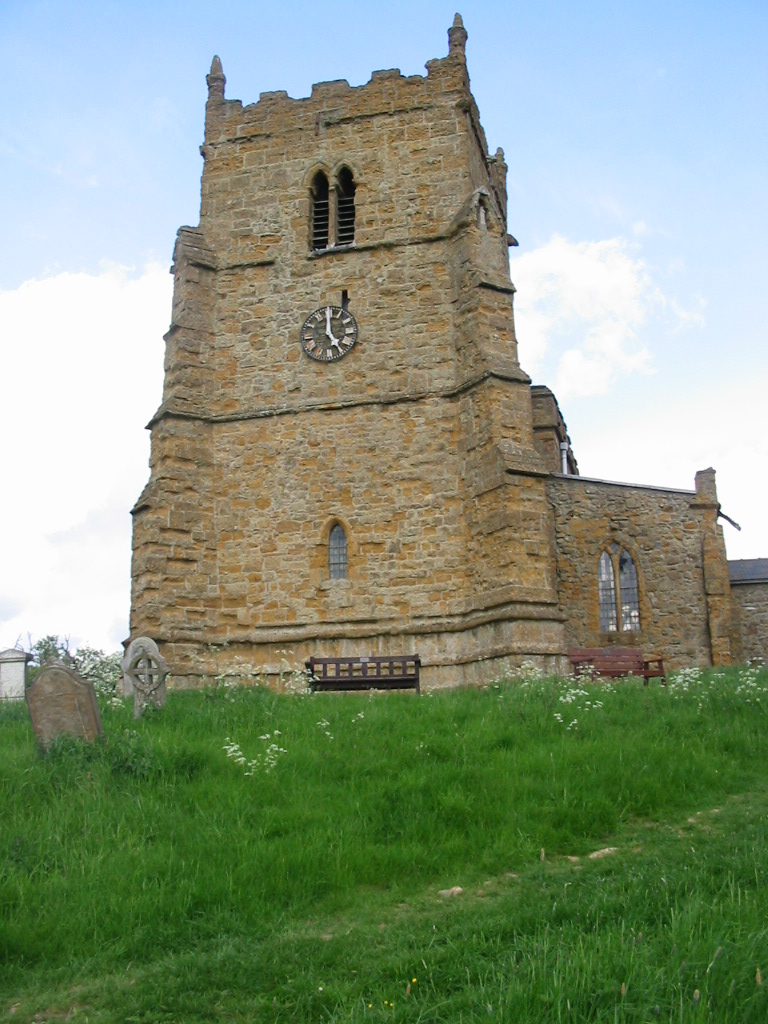
- The Ramblers' Church (All Saints' Old Church) is on a hill overlooking the village

- Location within Lincolnshire
- Population: 249 (Census, 2011)
- OS grid reference: TF134923
  - London: 130 mi (210 km) S
- Civil parish: Walesby
- District: West Lindsey
- Shire county: Lincolnshire
- Region: East Midlands
- Country: England
- Sovereign state: United Kingdom
- Post town: MARKET RASEN
- Postcode district: LN8
- Dialling code: 01673
- Police: Lincolnshire
- Fire: Lincolnshire
- Ambulance: East Midlands
- UK Parliament: Gainsborough

Walesby is a village and civil parish in the West Lindsey district of Lincolnshire, England. The population of the civil parish at the 2011 census was 249. It lies in the Lincolnshire Wolds, 3 miles (5 km) north-east from Market Rasen and 7 miles (11 km) south from Caistor. Tealby parish lies to the south-east. The parish covers about 3,600 acres (15 km^{2}) and includes the hamlets of Risby and Otby.

The name 'Walesby' is thought to mean 'farm/settlement of Valr' or another suggestion is 'farm/settlement of the Britons'.

St Mary's is an Arts and Crafts style church designed by the architect Temple Moore in 1913. It is a Grade II* listed building. The church was temporarily closed after the 2008 Market Rasen earthquake when a large crack appeared in the tower and masonry fell inside the church. St Mary's was also damaged in the 1930s when a hurricane dislodged its 'candle snuffer' spire resulting in its eventual removal.

In the 1930s an earlier church, All Saints', was renovated after it fell into disuse. It is Grade I listed. Now known as the 'Ramblers Church', in its south aisle it features a stained-glass window of 1950, financed by the Grimsby and District Wayfarers Association, showing a central figure of Christ, with hikers with haversacks on the left and cyclists on the right. The Viking Way long-distance route passes close to All Saints'.

== See also ==
- St Mary's Chapel, Lead, also known as the 'Ramblers Church'

== Gallery ==
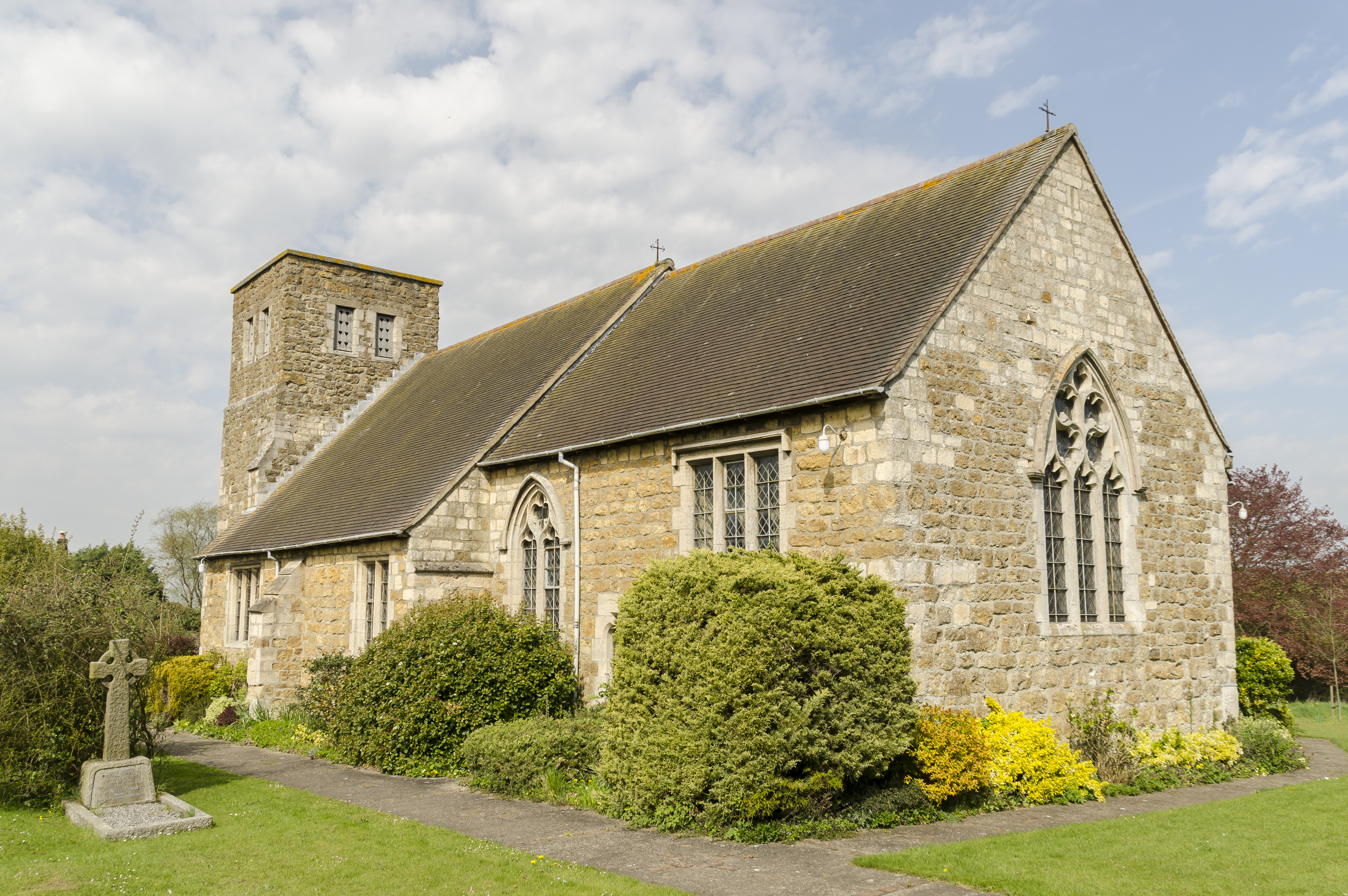
St Mary's Church, Walesby

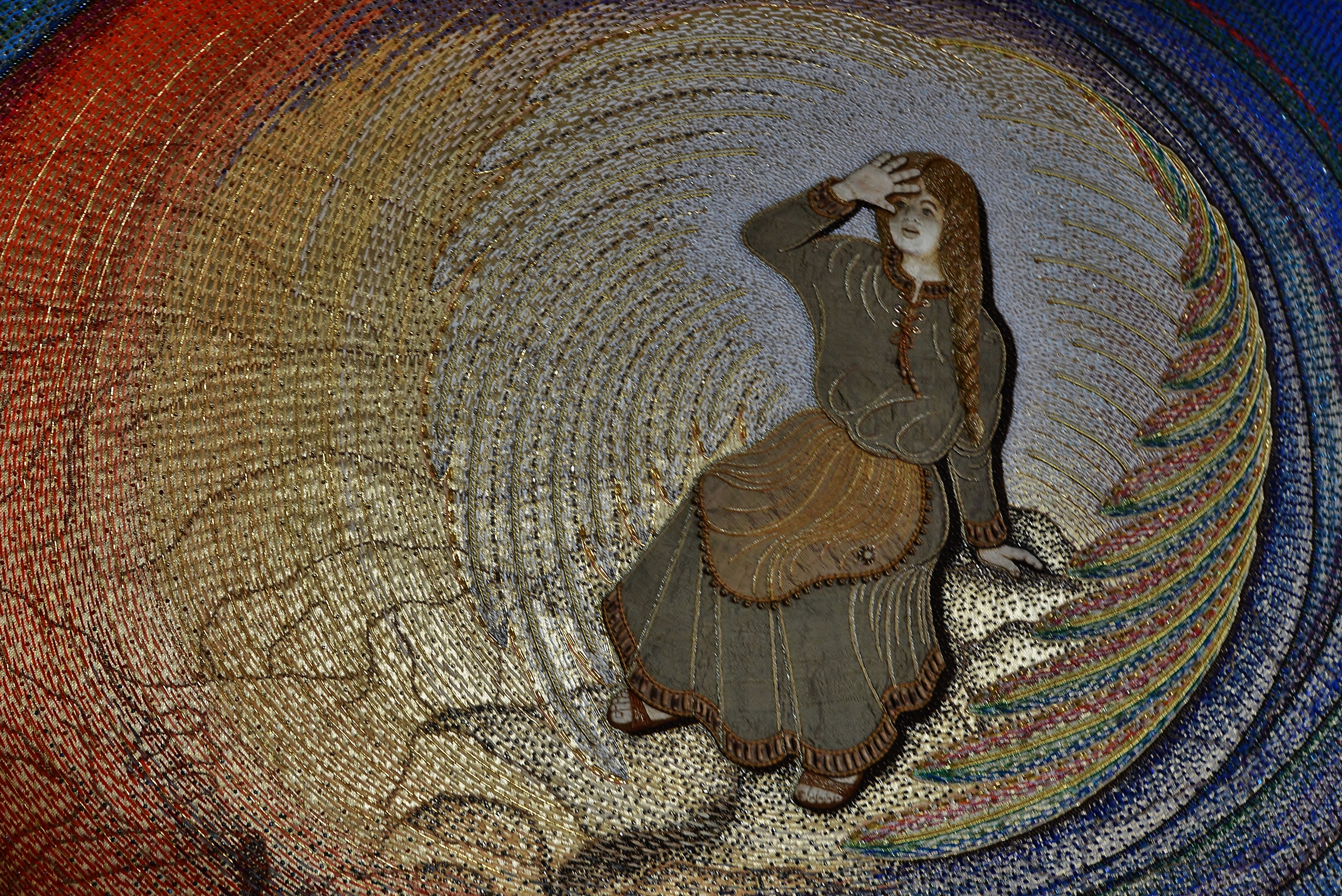
The Annunciation embroidery by Dilys Jones in St Mary's

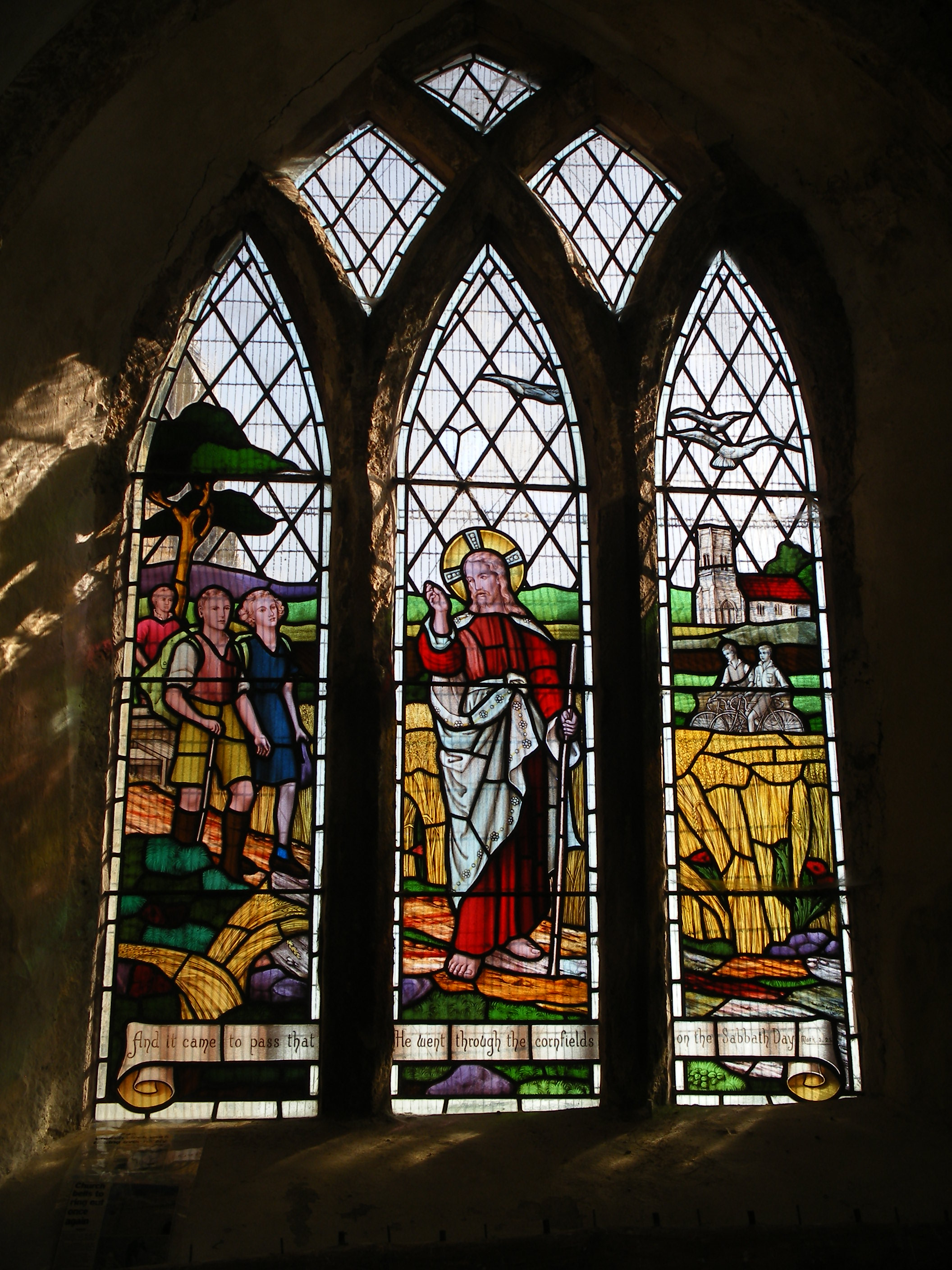
Stained-glass window in All Saints'
