= A631 road =

Road in England

A631

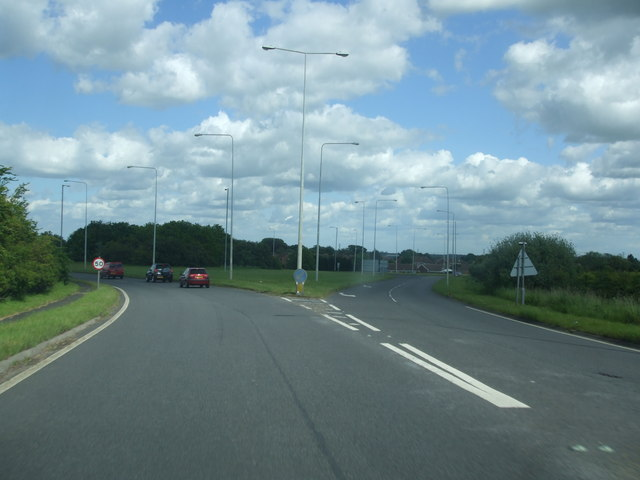
- A631 at Junction with A161 in Beckingham

Route information
- Length: 62.8 mi (101.1 km)

Major junctions
- From: Sheffield
- A6102 A6109 A6178; M1 J34 A630 A618 A6123 A6021 M18 J1 A634; A60 A638 A614 A161 A620 A156 A159; A15 A1103; A46 A157
- To: Louth

Location
- Country: United Kingdom
- Primary destinations: Meadowhall, Rotherham, Maltby, Bawtry, Gainsborough

Road network
- Roads in the United Kingdom; Motorways; A and B road zones

The A631 is a road running from Sheffield, South Yorkshire to Louth, Lincolnshire in England. It passes through the counties of South Yorkshire, Nottinghamshire and Lincolnshire. The road has many towns on its route including Rotherham, Maltby, Gainsborough and Market Rasen. It is mostly single road throughout its length but has some stretches of dual carriageway as well.

== Sheffield (Meadowhall) to Bawtry ==
The road starts at the M1/A6109 junction at Meadowhall. This is the northern half of Junction 34 on the M1. The road then passes under the M1 on the lower deck of the Tinsley Viaduct as a dual carriageway with the Meadowhall Shopping Centre visible to the southwest. At the southern half of junction 34 a roundabout links the road to the A6178 Sheffield Road and the A6102 Shepcote Lane (part of the Sheffield by-pass). This short section is classified as a trunk road.

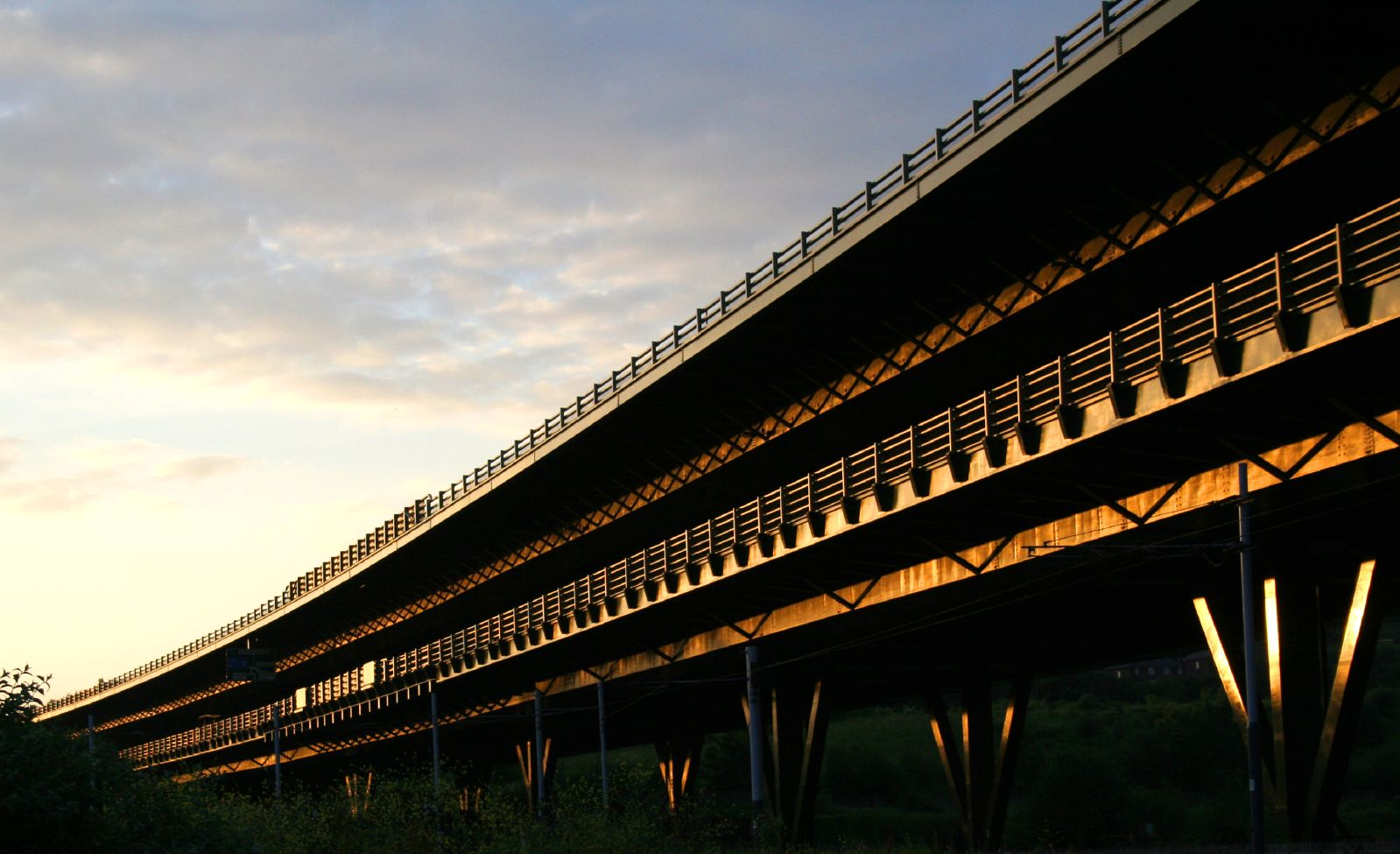
Tinsley Viaduct

After the M1 the road is a single carriageway non-trunk road and heads east to Rotherham as Bawtry Road through Tinsley. It passes Tinsley Infants School and Tinsley Junior School, and on the left hand side on the corner oh Highgate is the Pike & Heron. The Jamia al Hudaa Sheffield, a girls' independent Muslim secondary school is on the right, and opposite Park House Lane is the Outokumpu sports and social club, with Sheffield Hallam University's Graham Solley Sports Development Centre on the right (where SHU play other universities at sport). The road enters the borough of Rotherham at a bend to the left, becomes the parish boundary between Brinsworth and Rotherham, and there is a crossroads, with the left for Balk Lane and the BOC Brinsworth Operations Centre, opposite Firth Rixson Aurora Sports Club, and the right for Bonet Lane (B6067) near The Fairway. There is a left turn for Phoenix Golf Club, a right turn for Brinsworth Lane near former The Atlas and the Esso Brinsworth Service Station, a right turn for Whitehill Lane (B6066, for Catcliffe, and is also the Trans Pennine Trail). It passes under a 15 ft 3 in railway bridge, and crosses the River Rother.

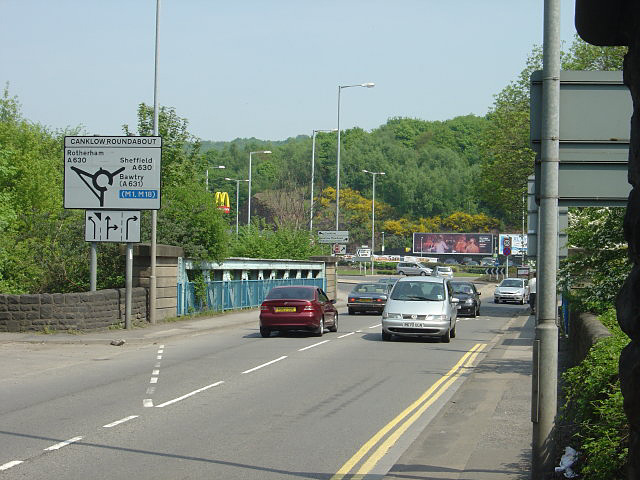
Canklow Roundabout

The road then serves as a bypass of Rotherham after it combines with the dual-carriageway Centenary Way (A630) at Canklow Roundabout. A Total garage is on the right, and a McDonald's and the Pace (former Q8) Canklow Service Station is opposite. It continues to the south-east as the non-trunk dual-carriageway West Bawtry Road, with Canklow Woods to the east, on the side of the Rother Valley. Canklow Meadows Industrial Estate is on the right with Leger Holidays HQ, the large Crossroads Volvo truck garage, and Manheim Auctions. It is followed by the Canklow Meadows Retail Park, and it passes the Holiday Inn Rotherham-Sheffield on the left (former Swallow Hotel), opposite Energy Alloys. The A630 (Rotherway) leaves to the right at the busy Rotherway Roundabout, over the River Rother, to junction 33 of the M1, with a large electrical substation to the right. The A631 used to continue to the east as a trunk single-carriageway, but was upgraded to dual carriage way to the A618, and is crosses by the Rotherham Roundwalk. The West Bawtry Road Improvement – Rotherway to Whiston Crossroads was built by Birse Civils of Barton-upon-Humber for £5 million. The A631 is now dual-carriageway between the M1 and M18 junctions.

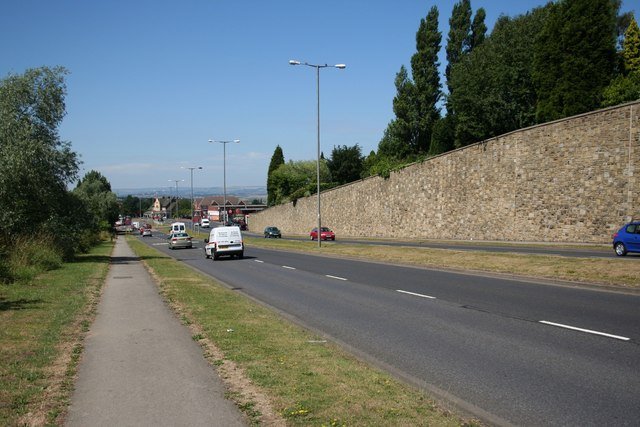
Brecks

The A631 then continues round Rotherham crossing the A618, becoming the dual-carriageway East Bawtry Road. Moorgate is to the left and Whiston is to the right – the road is the Rotherham-Whiston parish boundary. Ember Inns The Hind is on the right. It meets the B6410 and the A6123 (Herringthorpe Valley Road, the Rotherham ring road) at the Worrygoose Roundabout. The A631 becomes a non-trunk road and meets the A6021 at the Brecks Roundabout, also meeting Brecks Lane. After the roundabout is the Rotherham Premier Inn, and The Brecks Beefeater pub on the left, opposite an Esso garage. Further on the left is a small Sainsbury's, some takeaways, and Texaco The Brecks garage. It becomes Bawtry Road, passing the Dalton Listerdale Junior and Infants School, and passes through Listerdale and Wickersley with a parade of shops either side and The Three Horseshoes on the left, being crossed by the Rotherham Roundwalk. The Masons Arms is on the left, next to the Wickersley Roundabout which meets Northfield Lane from the left and Morthen Road (B6060) from the right, with the St Albans CE primary school to the south. It passes eastwards through Bramley with Wickersley library and the Wickersley School and Sports College on the right, next to the footbridge, meeting the B6093 from the left (for Sunnyside) near St Francis church. Rotherham Morrisons is on the right hand side, with access for the Rotherham East Ibis hotel. There is also the Sir Jack Roast Inn carvery and a McDonald's. A 2.5-mile section, west of the M18 to Brecks Hotel, was widened to dual carriageway from early 1972.

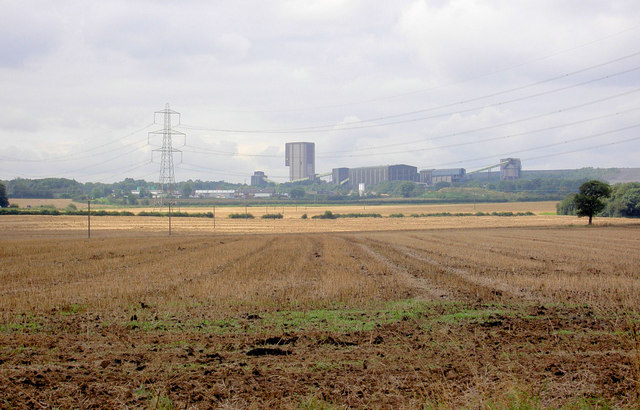
Maltby Main Colliery

The road crosses the M18 at Junction 1 and continues as Bawtry Road, a trunk road, through Hellaby, with a left turn for the Hellaby Industrial Estate, and the large Stockyard truck stop. There are speed cameras on this stretch. It enters Maltby as Rotherham Road with a left turn for Addison Road, then passes Maltby Academy and leisure centre on the left, and Hooton Levitt and St Bartholomew parish church on the right. The A634 leaves to the south east for Blyth and Retford, and Braithwell Road (B6376) leaves to the left. It passes through the town centre as High Street, passing the fire station and library on the left. It then crosses the B6427 then heads east towards Tickhill, passing the Lumley Arms. The main landmark on the left hand side is Maltby Main Colliery, for which there is an entrance on the left, opposite Maltby Wood. It crosses a railway and Scotch Spring Lane (the Doncaster-Rotherham boundary), for Stainton, is on the left, the point where the road becomes the Doncaster-Rotherham boundary for one mile, just before being crossed by a 400 kV pylon line, the point where it also enters the Doncaster postcode.

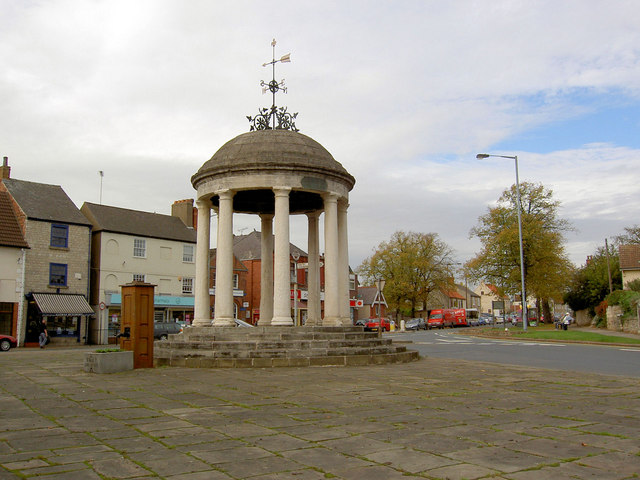
The Market Cross, a buttercross built in 1777, looking north along the A60, in the middle of the A631 T-junction in Tickhill in 2007

Limekiln Lane is on the left, and the landscape is now mostly rural from here to Bawtry. At the junction of Blyth Gate Lane on the right, the borough boundary leaves to the south along Sandbeck lane and the road enters the Borough of Doncaster. It passes under a railway line and enters Tickhill as Rotherham Road where it meets the A60 from the right. It continues along West Gate, passing the police station on the left. There is a right turn for Tickhill Castle, and the road bends sharply to the left near the Millstone. on the left is St Mary's Church, Tickhill. The road passes along Castle Gate and a JET garage, and at the Market Place, the A60 continues straight ahead, and the A631 leaves sharply to the right at a T-junction for Sunderland Street.

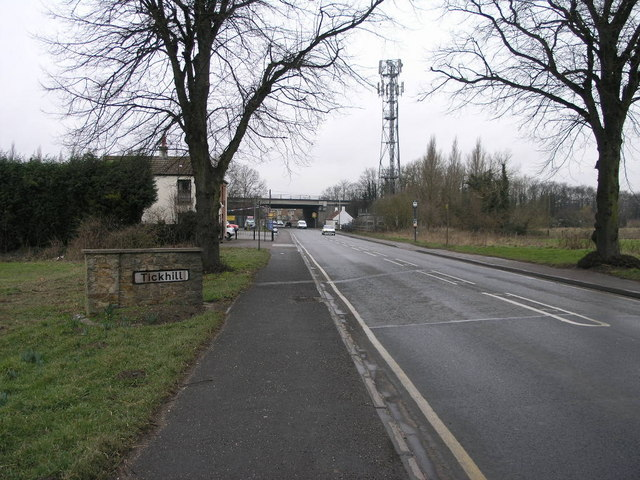
Passing under the A1(M)

After Tickhill the road passes under the A1(M) (Doncaster bypass) near a radio mast then over the beginnings of the River Torne, and crosses the B6463 (for Harworth to the south) as Bawtry Road at Spital Hill. It meets the Nottinghamshire boundary from the south, which follows the road all the way to Bawtry for around three miles. Harworth is to the south, and it meets Bawtry Road (for Harworth) from the right. There is a bend to the left, with Swinnow Wood on the left, and Plumtree Farm Industrial Estate on the right. The road enters Bawtry as Tickhill Road, with the Nottinghamshire boundary passing along the southern edge of the town. In Bawtry, next to Bawtry Hall, it meets the north-south A638, also a trunk road, the former A1.

== Bawtry to Louth ==
The road starts again slightly further south off the A638 and A614, and heads east of Bawtry passing under the East Coast Main Line railway as Gainsborough Road. It then crosses the River Idle at Bawtry Bridge and enters Nottinghamshire and Bassetlaw. The road bends to the right and becomes dual carriageway as it bypasses the village of Scaftworth, which has two exits to the right; the Scaftworth bypass was built in 1936. It bends to the left and continues as the single carriageway Bawtry Road (passing SPECS average speed cameras) through Everton, with Harwell on the left. There is a right turn for Mattersey at the Sun Inn. Further on the B6045 joins from Blyth at Drakeholes, where the road has been diverted to the north, over the Chesterfield Canal and Cuckoo Way. The section was improved in 1960, west of Gringley, and later in 1965 as the 'East of Drakeholes' improvement; dual carriageway was proposed on the section in the 1960s. The £215,000 Drakeholes diversion started in August 1972, to finish in early 1973, being built by A.F. Budge.

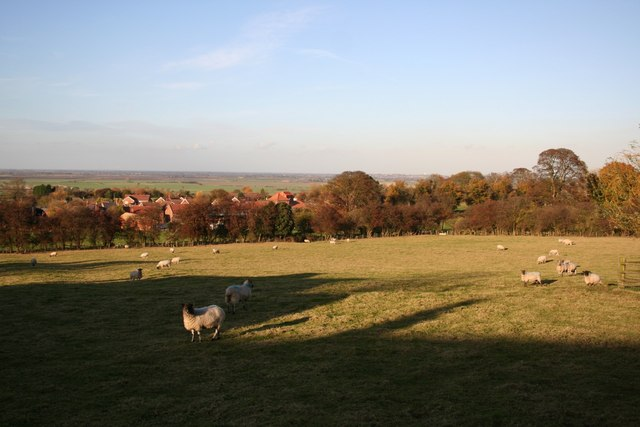
Gringley on the Hill

As Gainsborough Road it passes along the top of an escarpment (Cuckoo Hill to the south) near Prospect Hill Farm, and there is a right turn for Wiseton. It passes Park House Farm and climbs Mill Hill then becomes dual carriageway at Gringley on the Hill, which it bypasses to the south on the edge of the escarpment; the bypass was built in the late 1930s. On the bypass, Clayworth Road exits to the right and Beacon Hill Road (and the Trent Valley Way) to the left, both part of the B1403 (from Misterton). It climbs Beacon Hill, resuming the former route. To the south West Burton power stations and Cottam power stations can be seen. It gently descends the hill and at Beckingham meets the A161 (from the north) at a roundabout near Mill Farm. Previously it met the A161 in the village.

There had been a terrible crash at 11.15am on Tuesday 16 April 1968 at the A631 level crossing, which made national news, where five occupants were killed, including three children. It was the 10am York to Great Yarmouth train, and the level crossing was a new automatic half-barrier, which had been installed 18 months earlier. The driver of the car was John Hilton, aged 50, manager of the New Charnwood Restaurant at Blyth, Nottinghamshire, with his two sons Stuart, 8, and Irvine, 9, and his daughter Sheena, 13, and with his mother-in-law Maria Moody. His wife, May, was elsewhere. A.F. Budge were given the £725,301 contract for the Beckingham bypass in March 1973, to take 18 months from April 1973; the bypass was finished in January 1974, with soil from the Gainsborough relief road, eight months early.

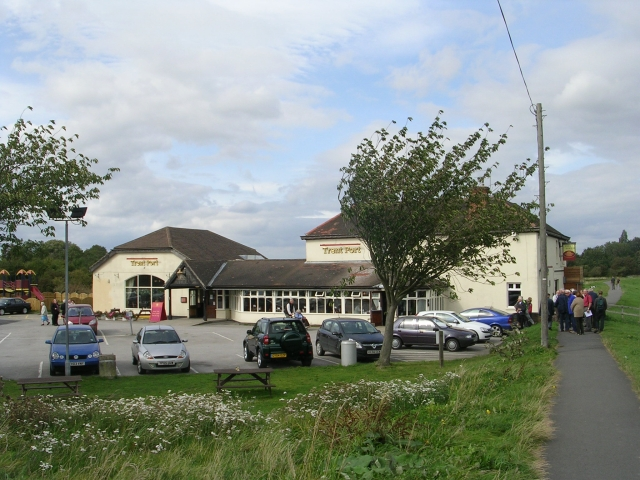
Trent Port Inn

The road becomes dual carriageway again as the road follows the Beckingham Bypass, then reaches another roundabout with the A620, from the south (and for Retford). The road continues as dual carriageway, crossing the Doncaster to Lincoln Line, with the former road being Ramper Road to the south, and becomes the single carriageway The Flood Road, on the former route, being the Beckingham-Saundby parish boundary. Approaching Gainsborough it passes the Stonehouse Trent Port. Crossing Trent Bridge, Gainsborough it enters West Lindsey and Lincolnshire. It then goes through Gainsborough, meeting two spurs of Lea Road (A156) and Trinity Street (A159) at a roundabout. There is an exit for Thorndike Way, the A631 Gainsborough Relief Road, started by Tarmac in late 1972, and opened on Friday 10 May 1974. Lindsey County Council intended to continue the dual carriageway all the way to the A15 at Caenby Corner. On the southern relief road, it passes The Gainsborough Academy (former Trent Valley Academy) to the south, and there is a right turn at traffic lights for Heapham Road. Corringham Road (B1433), the former route, is to the left, and nearby is the Road Safety Markings Association.

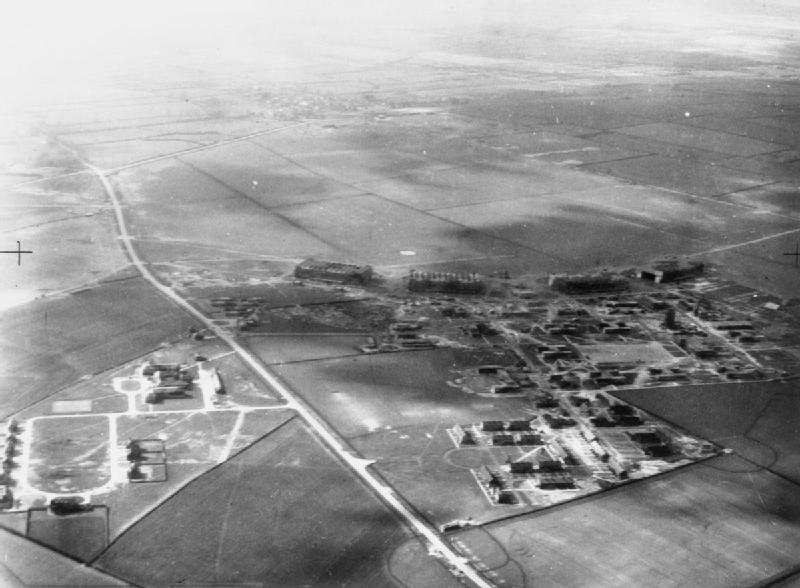
RAF Hemswell in c. 1941 with the route passing east–west, to the left of the picture; the airfield had squadrons 61 and 144, both flying Hampdens with 5 Group

At Woodhouse Farm it resumes its former route. As Corringham Road it enters Corringham, passing the Beckett Arms. There is a left turn for Hemswell Lane, and it continues as Harpswell Lane, becoming the parish boundary for two miles between Hemswell and Harpswell. It climbs the Lincoln Cliff to meet Middle Street (B1398) at a roundabout at Harpswell. It becomes the parish boundary between Hemswell Cliff and Harpswell, with the former RAF Hemswell (where The Dam Busters was filmed in 1954) adjacent on the left, and the Hemswell Court conference centre on the right. There is a right turn for Dog Kennel Road (for Glentworth). The road becomes the parish boundary of Hemswell Cliff and Glentworth. At Caenby Corner it meets the A15 at a roundabout near the Total Caenby Corner Garage, and passes through the parish of Glentham. Near Highfield Farm it becomes the parish boundary of Glentham and Caenby, then passes through Glentham and the Crown Inn, and in the distance are the Lincolnshire Wolds. At Bishopbridge it crosses the River Ancholme, which is its must southern navigable point. It passes The Bell and becomes the parish boundary between Osgodby (to the north) and West Rasen (to the south).

At Kingerby Wood, the A1103 continues for four miles to the left as a trunk road to the A46, and the A631 leaves to the right as a non-trunk road. Most traffic will follow the A1103 for Grimsby. The road becomes more twisty and meets a roundabout at West Rasen, where it crosses the River Rase. As Gainsborough Road it meets the trunk road A46, from the right, at Middle Rasen where the A46 does not have priority. It follows the A46 for a half-mile, and the A46 continues to the left, with the A631 leaving at a right turn. It enters Market Rasen as Gainsborough Road then becomes King Street. It meets the B1202 (former A46) from the left, and as Queen Street passes under the Newark to Grimsby Line then is crosses by the B1203 at traffic lights. As Willingham Road it passes the De Aston School and Market Rasen Racecourse on the right. In Tealby parish it passes through Willingham Woods.

It passes through North Willingham, with a right turn for Sixhills. It then ascends the western edge of the Lincolnshire Wolds as Willingham Road to 142 metres height, crossing Caistor High Street (B1225) at Boucherette Farm, where it enters East Lindsey. It passes through Ludford where it is briefly followed by the Viking Way, passing the Black Horse on the right and the White Hart. At a crossroads the Viking Way leaves to the right. It passes through the parish of Calcethorpe with Kelstern, with a left turn for Kelstern. It passes Cotes Grange Farm with a crossroads for Welton le Wold, to the right. It passes through South Elkington, where in the parish of Elikington it terminates at the A157 just outside Louth (53.3652°N 0.0339°W).
