= River Ancholme =

River in Lincolnshire, England

Coordinates: 53.6783°N 0.5249°W

- The old River Ancholme in Brigg

Location
- Country: England
- County: Lincolnshire

Physical characteristics
- Source
  - location: Bishopbridge, Lincolnshire
- Mouth
  - location: South Ferriby, Lincolnshire (The Humber, North Sea)
- Length: 27 km (17 mi)(navigable)

The River Ancholme is a river in Lincolnshire, England, and a tributary of the Humber. It rises at Ancholme Head, a spring just north of the village of Ingham and immediately west of the Roman Road, Ermine Street. It flows east and then north to Bishopbridge west of Market Rasen, where it is joined by the Rase. North of there it flows through the market town of Brigg before draining into the Humber at South Ferriby. It drains a large part of northern Lincolnshire between the Trent and the North Sea.

The river has been used by humans since at least 800 BC, seen by the excavation of a planked boat at Brigg. Letters patent for improvements to the river are known from 1287 onwards. Major change occurred in 1635, when a new straight channel was constructed from Bishopbridge to Ferriby. The new channel carries most of the water, the New River Ancholme, whereas the Old River Ancholme still meanders. The latter is mostly reduced to a ditch, save around Brigg's central 'Island Carr'. Further improvements were started by John Rennie (the Elder) in the early 1800s and completed by his son in the 1820s, with the reconstruction of Ferriby Sluice taking place around 1841.

From that time onwards the river was reasonably profitable. Receipts fell when railways arrived locally but trade picked up in the 1890s, and was boosted by cargoes of sugar beet in the 1930s. All commercial carrying ceased: above Brigg by the 1970s; altogether as of the 1980s. Upper reaches were in places part-blocked so were restored and dredged in 2004. The river is used for leisure, with boating, rowing, canoeing and fishing taking place. Responsibility or merely the name of the body for the river changed six times between 1930 and 1996, ending with the Environment Agency.

The Ancholme Internal Drainage Board maintains twelve pumping stations which can pump water from the surrounding low-lying land to prevent flooding. The river is used by Scunthorpe Steelworks, and Anglian Water supplying the South Humber bank industrial area. To meet these needs in many dry times water is transferred from Barlings Eau, near the Witham, by the Trent-Witham-Ancholme transfer scheme, commissioned in 1974.

Some bridges are private rights of way – remaining such as conscious of the risk of driver shortcutting and over-use – many such are listed (statutorily protected for architectural merit or age). Similarly, Ferriby Lock is a scheduled ancient monument. Local moorings host two historic boats owned by the Humber Keel & Sloop Preservation Society.

== History ==
In its natural post-glacial state, the river's valley was flat-bottomed: it had formed the bed of the glacial Lake Ancholme, on an outwash delta, as the ice retreated, and consequently was fenny. There is evidence that boats have used the river from early times, for there have been three significant archaeological finds of ancient boats. Logboats have been found at Brigg and Appleby, and a planked boat was found at Brigg in 1888. Professor McGrail conducted a re-excavation of the site in 1974, to discover the bottom of a flat-bottomed boat, made from oak planks, sewn together and caulked with moss. The boat was thus similar in construction to the Ferriby Boats found on the northern shore of the Humber, but was some 500 years younger, being carbon-dated to around 800 BC.

Further evidence of the local importance of the river in prehistory is evidenced by other finds or archaeology close to the river's course. As an example, in the parish of Bishop Norton, which is situated just over 1 km north of Bishopbridge. In this parish the Lincolnshire Historical Environment Record (HER) records just under 90 sites, from different historic periods. The majority of the prehistorical sites, including settlements, are close to the Ancholme. Most of these range from the Neolithic (4000 BCE to 2351 BCE), through the Bronze Age to the Romano-British period. The oldest find in the parish was a Paleolithic handaxe discovered close to the site of the Harlam Hill Lock on a hummock of river gravels. This find dates anywhere from 500,000 BCE to 150,001 BCE. This axe, along with several Neolithic axes are now in Lincoln Museum.

The course of the old river acts as a boundary for Bishop Norton and all the other parishes that abut it. This being the eastern boundary; the western boundary is Ermine Street. The fact that the majority of archaeology in the parish, as recorded in the HER that dates from after the construction of the Roman Road, tends to the western end of the parish close to the Roman road, and that from earlier periods tends to be closer to the river is suggestive that the River was a primary communications route as well as the provider of physical and economic need which was supplanted by the new road.

Despite suffering from silting as a result of water from the Humber entering it, and passing through land which was often waterlogged on both sides, the Ancholme offered a route into the communities of northern Lincolnshire. Cargo was carried on it from an early date: in 1287 a patent was granted to allow improvements to be made from Bishopbridge to Ferriby, so that boats could more easily carry grain and other commodities on the river "as they had done formerly". However, the major concern of the local landowners seems to have been that it should act as an effective drainage channel to prevent inundation of their lands, and between 1289 and 1418 the river was mentioned in the Patent Rolls thirteen times. The need to keep the channel scoured was always mentioned, but often, navigation was not.

The river was subject to a repeated cycle of concerns being raised, improvements being made, euphoria at the result, and decline through neglect. However, in 1635 Owersby-based local landowner Sir John Monson was granted powers to construct a new river for drainage purposes. He removed most of the meanders, to create a new straight channel from Bishopbridge to Ferriby. The patent under which the work was carried out was again chiefly concerned with drainage, although there was a requirement to make sure that any new works did not make the river less useful for the passage of boats than it had been for the previous seven years. At Ferriby, where there had been a bridge since 1312, a sluice was constructed, to control the deposition of silt from the Humber. It had three arches and 24 doors, but there is no mention of how boats could pass through it.

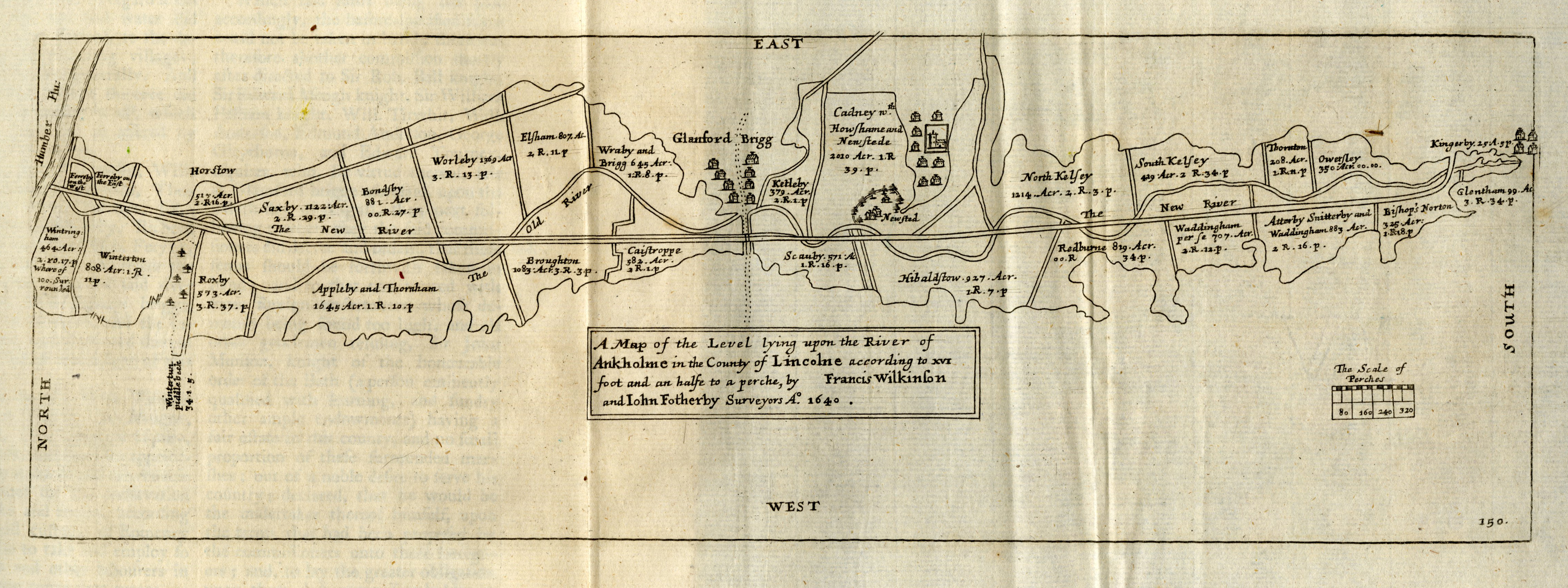
"A map of the Level lying upon the River of Ancholme, in the county of Lincoln, according to XVI Feet and a half to a Perch, by Francis Wilkinson and John Fotherby, Surveyors, Anno 1640." from "The history of imbanking and drayning" by William Dugdale (1662).

River Ancholm Level Act 1662
- Act of Parliament
- Parliament of England
- Long title: An Act for confirming of several Decrees of Sewers, made by the Commissioners of the Limits of the Level of the River of Antholme, in the County of Lyncolne.
- Citation: 14 Cha. 2. c. 17 Pr.
- Territorial extent: England and Wales

Dates
- Royal assent: 19 May 1662
- Commencement: 7 January 1662 (Note: Start of session.)
Other legislation
Relates to	River Ancholme Navigation and Drainage Act 1766

Status: Current legislation

At Brigg, the new channel bypassed the town, but the old channel was also retained, which made the town less vulnerable to flooding. The draining of the Ancholme Level was a lesser project among the fenland "improvements" undertaken under contracts to patentees by the government of Charles I in the 1630s. It was somewhat less brutal than many such projects, for Kennedy states that "... with the possible exception of the Ancholme Level the draining of the fens was executed and defended by a continuous and unscrupulous use of the power and authority of the royal government to manipulate local institutions and to overawe the local populace."

River Ancholme Navigation and Drainage Act 1766
- Act of Parliament
- Parliament of Great Britain
- Long title: An Act for the more effectual draining the Lands lying in the Level of Ancholme in the County of Lincoln, and making the River Ancholme navigable from the River Humber at or near a Place called Ferraby Sluice in the County of Lincoln, to the Town of Glemford Briggs; and for continuing the said Navigation up or near to the said River, from thence to Bishop Briggs, in the said County of Lincoln.
- Citation: 7 Geo. 3. c. 98
- Territorial extent: Great Britain

Dates
- Royal assent: 20 May 1767
- Commencement: 11 November 1766 (Note: Start of session.)
Other legislation
Amended by	Ancholme Drainage Act 1833; Anglian Water Authority Act 1977
Relates to	River Ancholm Level Act 1662; South Ferriby (Lincolnshire) Inclosure Act 1801; Ancholme Drainage and Navigation Act 1825

Status: Amended

Text of statute as originally enacted

The antiquarian William Stukeley visited the river and in 1724 published a report in which he lamented the fact that the sluices below the stately bridge were "broken down and lying in dismal ruins by the negligence of the undertakers." Conditions continued to deteriorate, so that in 1766, landowners in the Ancholme floodplain contracted Thomas Yeoman to survey the river. He pointed to the decay of Ferriby Sluice, which had resulted in silting of the navigation as far as Glanford, some 8.7 miles (14.0 km) above Ferriby. In places the width had been reduced from 40 feet (12 m) to 15 or 16 ft (about 4.8 m), which significantly reduced its capacity to cope with flood waters. Above Glanford, lugworm beds, weeds and sandbanks impeded progress, and the final 5 miles (8 km) to Bishopbridge was completely silted up. Yeoman produced his report on 17 September 1766, and the River Ancholme Navigation and Drainage Act 1766 (7 Geo. 3. c. 98) to authorise improvements to both navigation and drainage was granted on 20 May 1767.

=== Development ===
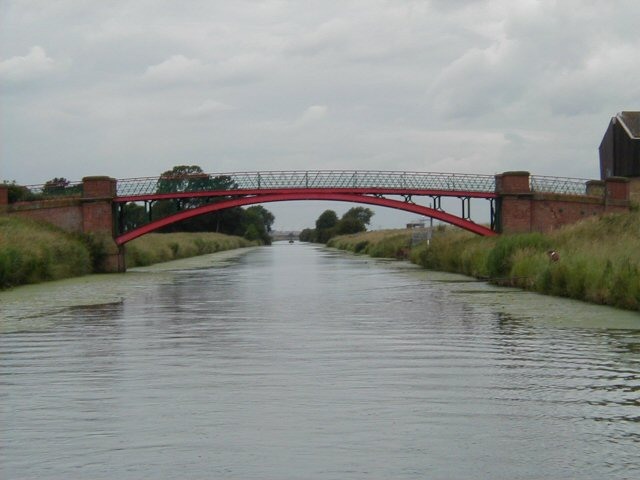
Cadney Bridge, between Cadney and Hibaldstow is one of several iron bridges.

The River Ancholme Navigation and Drainage Act 1766 created commissioners, and John Bennett from Barton-upon-Humber was appointed clerk. The minutes of the commissioners show that their major concern was with drainage, rather than navigation, although the new sluice at Ferriby included a 70 by 14.75 ft (21.34 by 4.50 m) lock and a house for the lock keeper. The sluice was built with three openings, but the sills were set at a level which was 8 feet (2.4 m) above the low water level of spring tides in the Humber, which was not low enough to ensure the drainage of the lowlands in times of flood. The work was completed in 1769.

The commissioners gradually realised that navigation might be beneficial, and on 7 April 1778 instructed their engineer, Dunderdale, to design a wharf for coal and general goods at Bishopbridge, and to construct a lock at Harlam Hill. No progress was made until 20 July 1785, when the commissioners met the proprietors to arrange the purchase of land for the wharf. By this time the engineer had been replaced by Thomas Bradley. The tolls had been leased to Jonathan and John Goodwin for a period of eleven years from 1781. They paid the commissioners £402 per year, and were expected to make good any damage by tides up to the value of £20, although the commissioners would pay for repairs where the cost exceeded £20. The lease expired on 2 July 1792, when the commissioners took back control, and appointed their own collector of tolls. They noticed a disparity in the tolls for coal, caused by the differing sizes of the wagons at various collieries. The collieries mentioned show that coal was arriving from the River Don Navigation and the Aire and Calder Navigation.

During the 1790s, the problems of effective drainage worsened, and the commissioners appointed Isaac Leatham, from Barton near Malton, to produce a comprehensive report with recommendations for the Ancholme Level. He addressed the issues of both drainage and navigation, and presented his plans on 29 August 1800, but commissioners thought the projected cost of £22,975 was excessive. They therefore approached John Rennie (the Elder) for a second opinion, and he produced a report on 9 November 1801. His proposals included constructing catchwater drains on either side of the main channel, enlarging the width and depth of the channel, building two new locks, and rebuilding the road bridge at Brigg. The cost was estimated to be £53,921, of which only 11 per cent was for improvements to navigation. Again, the commissioners were unhappy with the cost, and although Rennie suggested completing the work in stages, he later produced a modified plan which would only cost £25,413.

River Ancholme Drainage and Navigation Act 1802
- Act of Parliament
- Parliament of the United Kingdom
- Long title: An Act for altering and enlarging the Powers of an Act, passed in the Seventh Year of the Reign of His present Majesty, intituled "An Act for the more effectual draining the Lands lying in the Level of Ancholme, in the County of Lincoln, and making the River Ancholme navigable from the River Humber, at or near a Place called Ferraby Sluice, in the County of Lincoln, to the Town of Glamford Briggs, and for continuing the said Navigation up or near to the said River from thence to Bishop Briggs, in the said County of Lincoln."
- Citation: 42 Geo. 3. c. cxvi
- Territorial extent: United Kingdom

Dates
- Royal assent: 26 June 1802
- Commencement: 26 June 1802 (Note: The Acts of Parliament (Commencement) Act 1793.)
Other legislation
Amends	River Ancholme Navigation and Drainage Act 1766
Amended by	Ancholme Drainage and Navigation Act 1825; Ancholme Drainage Act 1833; River Ancholm And Winterton Beck Catchment Board Transfer Order 1933; Lincolnshire River Board (Ancholme Internal Drainage District) Order 1951; Anglian Water Authority Act 1977

Status: Amended

Text of statute as originally enacted

Ancholme Drainage and Navigation Act 1825
- Act of Parliament
- Parliament of the United Kingdom
- Long title: An Act for altering and enlarging the Powers of Two Acts of His late Majesty King George the Third, for draining Lands within the Level of Ancholme, in the County of Lincoln, and making certain Parts of the River Ancholme navigable.
- Citation: 6 Geo. 4. c. clxv
- Territorial extent: United Kingdom

Dates
- Royal assent: 22 June 1825
- Commencement: 22 June 1825
Other legislation
Amends	River Ancholme Navigation and Drainage Act 1766; River Ancholme Drainage and Navigation Act 1802
Amended by	Ancholme Drainage Act 1833; Anglian Water Authority Act 1977

Status: Amended

Text of statute as originally enacted

Ancholme Drainage Act 1833
- Act of Parliament
- Parliament of the United Kingdom
- Long title: An Act to alter and amend Three several Acts made in the Seventh and Forty-second Years of the Reign of King George the Third and the Sixth Year of the Reign of His late Majesty King George the Fourth, for draining Lands within the Level of Ancholme in the County of Lincoln, and making certain Parts of the River Ancholme navigable.
- Citation: 3 & 4 Will. 4. c. cxi
- Territorial extent: United Kingdom

Dates
- Royal assent: 9 July 1833
- Commencement: 9 July 1833
Other legislation
Amends	River Ancholme Navigation and Drainage Act 1766; River Ancholme Drainage and Navigation Act 1802; Ancholme Drainage and Navigation Act 1825

Status: Current legislation

Text of statute as originally enacted

The commissioners decided to proceed with the revised plan, and a new act of Parliament, the River Ancholme Drainage and Navigation Act 1802 (42 Geo. 3. c. cxvi) was obtained on 26 June 1802. The two locks were to be located at Harlam Hill and Kingerby, to improve navigation on the upper section. The act stipulated that oak mooring posts should be provided at 1 mile (1.6 km) intervals, to indicate the distance from Ferriby. Although most of the materials were ordered promptly, the work was hampered by a shortage of finance, and progress was very slow. After the project engineer, Samuel Porter, died in July 1808, the work ground to a halt, and in 1824 Sir John Rennie (the Younger) was asked for advice. He stated that the work specified by his father should be completed. He also recommended that the Ferriby sluice should be reconstructed, with the sills 8 feet (2.4 m) lower, and that the capacity of the channel should be doubled, by making it wider and deeper. Finally, a new entrance lock should be built, capable of accommodating boats of 60 tons, and 20 feet (6.1 m) wide. Another act of Parliament, the Ancholme Drainage and Navigation Act 1825 (6 Geo. 4. c. clxv) followed, and work began again in 1826. Progress was faster, although there were delays to the drainage works, caused by litigation over the rates that each district should pay towards the project.

Several of the existing bridges were constructed of wood, and had multiple openings, which restricted the flow of water through them. They were reconstructed in a variety of styles. Horkstow Bridge was planned as a cast iron bridge with an 80-foot (24 m) span, but was built as a suspension bridge with a span of 130 feet (40 m). It is one of the earliest suspension bridges still standing, and the only suspension bridge known to have been designed by Rennie. The bridge at Yarborough Mills, in Brigg, has a single segmental arch build of stone, and was opened in 1827, although it has been widened subsequently. The bridge at Brandy Wharf, which was completed in the following year, is more typical of the structures built at that time, consisting of an iron span with stone abutments. Harlam Hill lock was reconstructed in 1827, but plans for a second lock at Kingerby were dropped. Discussions had taken place in 1823 about extending the navigation to Market Rasen. The plans were revised and expanded in 1829, by which time a link from Bishopbridge to Barlings Eau and the River Witham was suggested. It would have cost £90,000 to build the 14-mile (23 km) waterway, including the construction of seven locks. Although the scheme was dropped, Rennie was still championing it in 1841 and 1844.

Rennie also oversaw the reconstruction of Ferriby Sluice and lock. An initial meeting with the commissioners was held on 4 October 1841. Work began in March 1842, and the cost was estimated to be £16,533. The Earl of Yarborough and Miss Alice Corbett officially opened the new sluice on 22 May 1844. The Earl of Yarborough arranged for his brass band to attend, and he then sailed through the new lock in a schooner. The lock was spanned by a swing bridge, cast by the Butterley Company, which was in use for 90 years, but was badly damaged in 1934 when a large vessel ran into it. Head Wrightson built the replacement swing bridge in 1935.

=== Operation ===
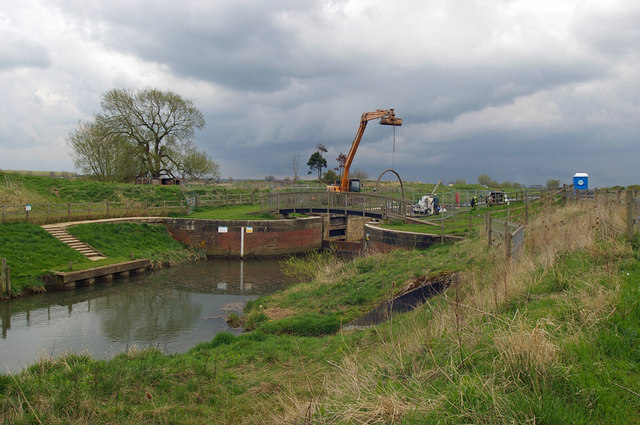
The Environment Agency were undertaking renovation work at Harlam Hill lock in 2008.

The navigation became an important route for transporting cargo from the rural communities to the towns of Beverley and Hull in the East Riding of Yorkshire. William Colton had run a packet boat between Brigg and Hull since 1793, and in 1823 he began operating a steam packet boat. It left Brigg at 7 am each day, arriving in Hull 10:30. The return journey left Hull at 3 pm, and was timetabled to connect with a coach service from Brigg to Lincoln. From October 1856 the service was run by the Hull, Ferriby Sluice and Brigg Steam Packet Company, formed by a group of farmers who lived between Brigg and Ferriby Sluice.

For many years, the tolls on the navigation were leased, and the value of the lease steadily increased, from £402 in the 1780s to £950 in 1828, and had reached £1,857 per year for the period from 1843 to 1845. For the following three years it was £3,020, but it then declined, as railways arrived in the area. Brigg railway station opened on 1 November 1848, and the line from there to Gainsborough Central followed on 2 April 1849. Tolls reduced, falling to £949 in 1850, and to £700 by the late 1850s. After thirty years, trade revived a little, with the tolls reaching £1,000 in the 1890s. It was further boosted by the development of the sugar beet industry in the 1930s, with tolls averaging £1,294 in the late 1930s. Bishopbridge, where there was a basin, two corn mills and warehousing, acted as a distribution and collection centre for the farms and villages of that part of Lincolnshire, but by the 1970s commercial traffic had ceased except between Ferriby and Brigg, where there were factories along the river bank. All commercial traffic had ceased by the 1980s.

Some development continued, with Snitterby bridge reconstructed in 1872, Hibaldstow in 1889 and Cadney in 1892. In 1977, Ian Horsley formed the Rase-Ancholme Navigation Trust, and in 1978 proposed upgrading of the upper section to Bishopbridge. His grand plans included the construction of three new locks on the River Rase, to link to Middle Rasen and Market Rasen. By the early 1980s, the scheme had grown to include further links to Horncastle and the Foss Dyke, thus creating a northern Lincolnshire waterways network, but the area was too sparsely populated for such ambitious plans to succeed. The Trust was registered in 1979, and ceased to exist in 2009.

By the 1980s, the section above Harlam Hill lock was almost derelict. Rennie's original lock had been reconstructed with a top guillotine gate at some point, and repairs to the lock were attempted in 1993. Although they were not successful, the Inland Waterways Association continued to campaign for the restoration of Harlam Hill lock, raising funds to assist this, and the Environment Agency completed dredging and restoration of the upper section in 2004. The restoration was funded by a grant of £100,000, the first successful bid for funds by the Lincolnshire Waterways Partnership. The work included the provision of new 48-hour visitor moorings at Bishopbridge, with portage points for canoeists nearby and at Harlam Hill lock.

The top gate of Harlam Hill lock was subsequently replaced by conventional mitre gates in 2010. Despite this successful restoration, the lock was again closed in 2012 by the Environment Agency on safety grounds, thus preventing access to the first two miles of the waterway. In 2017 there were no plans for its reopening.

The lock at South Ferriby, which allows boats to leave the river and enter the Humber, is a tide lock, with four sets of gates, two for use when the tidal Humber is at a higher level than the river, and two for when it is lower. From the Humber, a vessel can access many other major waterways leading to the larger towns of Lincolnshire and Yorkshire, as well as to the North Sea. Because the river acts as a drainage channel for the Ancholme Level, water levels and flow rates are subject to rapid change, and all navigation can be suspended after heavy rain, when the sluices are opened to prevent flooding.

=== Organisation ===
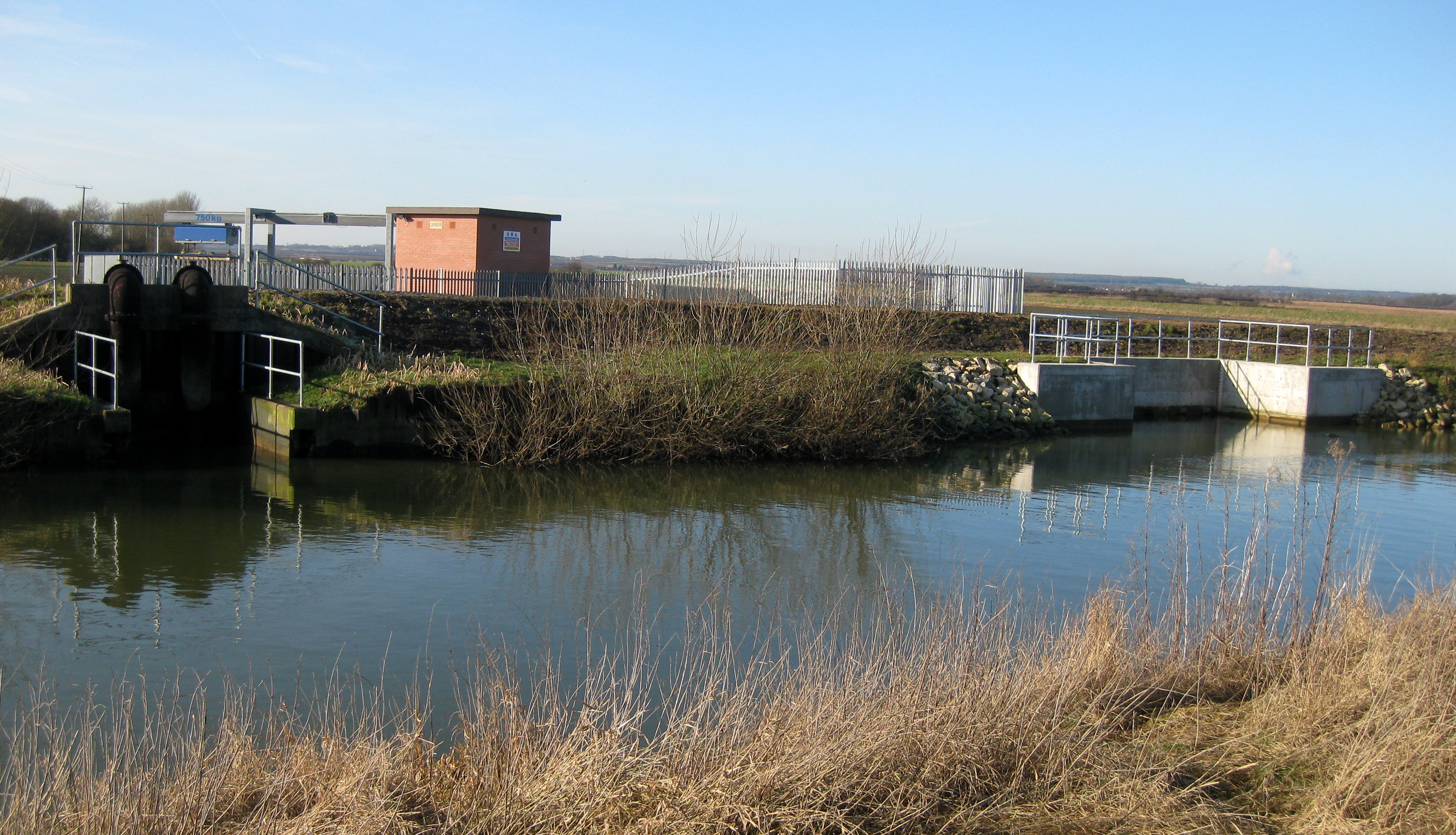
Redbourne Hayes is one of 12 pumping stations run by the Ancholme IDB which discharge into the river.

Responsibility for the river and the flood defences of the surrounding countryside changed several times during the 20th century. Under the Land Drainage Act 1930, 47 catchment areas were defined, covering many of the river systems of England and Wales, including the Ancholme and Winterton Beck Catchment Area. A catchment board had been set up to manage the area by November 1931. The catchment board was replaced by the Lincolnshire River Board following the passing of the River Boards Act 1948, and the new board also had responsibility for the River Welland, the River Witham and the Steeping River. Land drainage functions became the responsibility of the Ancholme Internal Drainage Board from 1951. This was formed under the terms of the Land Drainage Act 1930, and manages an area of 68.77 square miles (178.1 km^{2}) containing 119 miles (192 km) of maintained watercourses. Around half of the water falling on this area has to be pumped into the River Ancholme, because the land is too low-lying to allow gravity drainage. The IDB maintains 12 pumping stations on the banks of the river.

Responsibility for the river changed again with the passing of the Water Resources Act 1963: the river board was replaced by the Lincolnshire River Authority, although the geographical area which it managed was similar. This in turn became part of Anglian Water following the passing of the Water Act 1973. When the regional water authorities were privatised under the terms of the Water Act 1989, management of rivers, including the Ancholme, passed to the National Rivers Authority (NRA). Finally, the NRA was subsumed into the Environment Agency in 1996.

== Recreation ==
In addition to its function as a land drainage channel and for water supply, the river is also used for recreation. The waterway is managed by the Environment Agency, which requires all vessels to be registered and in possession of an up-to-date licence. There are over 200 boats registered, and there are moorings at Ferriby, Brigg, Brandy Wharf and Bishopbridge. Access to and from the Humber is restricted by extensive mud banks to the north of Ferriby Sluice, which are exposed at low tide. Passage through South Ferriby lock is therefore limited to three hours either side of high tide. The river is large enough to support small barges and medium-sized cabin cruisers. South Ferriby lock is 68 by 18 feet (20.7 by 5.5 m) with a draught of 4 feet 11 inches (1.50 m). Harlam Hill lock is smaller, at 60 by 16 feet (18.3 by 4.9 m) but the effective maximum length of boats is 40 feet (12 m), as there is nowhere above the lock to turn a longer boat. Small boats can be launched from a slipway at Brandy Wharf Leisure Park, on the western bank of the river.

The river is a popular venue for rowing, kayaking and canoeing.

=== Ancholme Rowing Club ===
Ancholme Rowing Club is based in Brigg, and caters for rowers of all abilities. It encourages junior membership, offers tuition, and organises two major events each year. The Ancholme Head race covers a 2,750-metre (3,010 yd) course, with open, women's, juniors, mixed and masters categories, and is affiliated to British Rowing. The Scrumpy Row has a more social orientation, and covers 6 miles (9.7 km) from Brigg to Brandy Wharf. The Environment Agency work with the club to support competitive and recreational rowing.

=== BCU members use ===
The Agency have an agreement with the British Canoe Union, allowing their members to use the river.

=== Yachts and cruiser/estuary vessel marinas ===
Some small sailing yachts use the river, and the slipway at Brandy Wharf has encouraged this kind of use.

The Ancholme has a marina at Brigg and another at South Ferriby, which has a chandlery and boat building facilities. Around three-quarters of the boats that use the river are sea-going vessels, as it provides easy access to the North Sea via the Humber.

=== Angling ===
The river is well stocked with fish, and provides high-class coarse fishing. There are organised competitions each year, including winter match angling, which attract anglers from Lincolnshire, South Yorkshire and nearby.

=== Pedestrians ===
The river is also popular with walkers, having a towpath along its entire length; other rights of way are associated with the river.

== Water supply ==
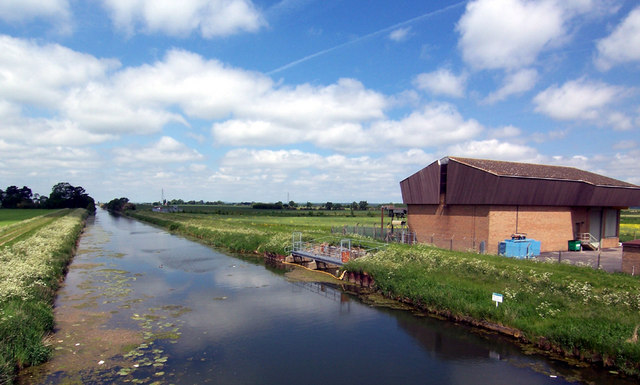
The Anglian Water intake at Cadney can abstract up to 31,000 Ml per year from the river.

During the late 1960s, there was increasing demand for water, particularly within the South Humber bank industrial area. Extractions from the underlying chalk aquifer could not be increased, and so the demand was met by building the Trent Witham Ancholme Transfer Scheme (TWA), which was commissioned in 1974. A pumping station at Short Ferry on Barlings Eau, near its junction with the River Witham, pumps water through 10.6 miles (17 km) of pipeline to a reservoir at Toft Newton, which covers an area of 41 acres (16.5 ha). During the summer months and other dry periods, water is released from the reservoir into the Ancholme to augment its flow and maintain its level. In the event of failure of the pumps at Short Ferry, the reservoir has enough capacity to maintain flows in the Ancholme for up to seven days. There is another pumping station at Torksey, on the River Trent, and in the event of low flows on the Witham, water is pumped from the Trent into the Foss Dyke, from where it flows eastwards to Lincoln and the River Witham system.

In 1996, removal of some 37,698 megalitres (8,292×10^{6} imp gal) per year from the river was covered by abstraction licences. Major holders of licences included British Steel plc, Centrica and Anglian Water. British Steel take water for the Scunthorpe Steelworks from a pumping station immediately to the north of Worlaby railway bridge. Centrica run the Glanford Brigg Power Station, located on the west bank of the river near Brigg. It is a gas-fired generating station, capable of producing 240 MW from six turbines. Water is taken from the river to supplement cooling water lost by evaporation, and some of the cooling water is discharged to the river to prevent a build up of suspended and dissolved solids. Water is also processed by a treatment plant, where it is filtered and ion-exchanged, to provide a clean supply for the boilers, which will not cause scaling or corrosion. Like the cooling water, the boiler feed water is also purged regularly, to prevent dissolved solids building up.

The largest abstractor is Anglian Water, who maintain a pumping station on the east bank of the river by Cadney bridge. They were licensed to remove 31,000 megalitres (6,800×10^{6} imp gal) per year in 1996, which is about 82 per cent of the total abstraction. After initial grit removal and chlorination, water is pumped for 1.2 miles (1.9 km) through twin 5.9-foot (1.8 m) diameter concrete pipelines to Cadney reservoir, which can hold 900 megalitres (200×10^{6} imp gal), covers 35 acres (14 ha), and has a maximum depth of 36 feet (11 m). After further chlorination, the water is pumped for another 6.2 miles (10 km) through a 4.0-foot (1.22 m) diameter steel pipeline to Elsham Water Treatment Works, which produces up to 30 megalitres (6.6×10^{6} imp gal) per day of potable water for public water supply.

In addition to supporting these abstractions, the use of water from the TWA scheme has other benefits. Because the flow is maintained even in dry weather, eutrophication, which is caused by a build up of nutrients in the water, is reduced, and the flow through Ferriby sluice also helps to prevent the ingress of salt water from the Humber into the river. The volume of water transferred via the TWA scheme depends on the weather conditions. In 1987 it was 2,425 megalitres (533×10^{6} imp gal), while in 1979 it was 17,425 megalitres (3,833×10^{6} imp gal).

== Course ==
The Ancholme rises near Top Farm, West Firsby, close to the 40-metre (130 ft) contour, from where it flows eastwards, gradually turning towards the north east. It passes through the site of the West Firsby deserted medieval village, which is a scheduled ancient monument, and then under Owmby Road, a minor road which connects the villages of Saxby and Spridlington. It soon drops below the 10-metre (33 ft) contour and turns to the north as is flows past Toft Newton reservoir, which is used to augment the flow of the river, and is supplied with water by the Trent Witham Ancholme transfer scheme. The reservoir is a popular site for stillwater trout fishing, and in 1996 was stocked with rainbow trout and brown trout twice weekly. Contributions from a number of organisations and individuals resulted in the purchase of a "wheelyboat", a flat-bottomed boat which allows wheelchair users to access the water. Passing under Pilford Bridge, near Toft next Newton, the river reaches Bishopbridge, where it is crossed by the A631 road.

The River Rase runs under an adjacent bridge, and the two rivers run parallel for the next 2.5 miles (4 km). On the Ancholme, there is a sloping weir, which forms the head of navigation, beyond which is a large four-storey building which was formerly a warehouse for the navigation. The towpath starts on the western bank soon after the wharf area, and Harlam Hill lock is reached after 2.5 miles (4.0 km). The bypass channel passes over a weir, and the water flows into the River Rase, which joins the Ancholme at Atterby weir, a little further below the lock. Rather than heavy wooden balance beams, the lock gates have slender metal poles to open them. Snitterby bridge, which is also known as Browns Bridge, is just below Atterby weir, and like most of the bridges over the river, is not part of a public roadway, so it is maintained by the Environment Agency, rather than the Highways Authority. Brandy Wharf bridge, at 4 miles (6.4 km) from the head of navigation, is one of the two bridges on a public road. Next to it is a brown-brick warehouse with three storeys and a slate hipped roof, which is a Grade II listed structure.

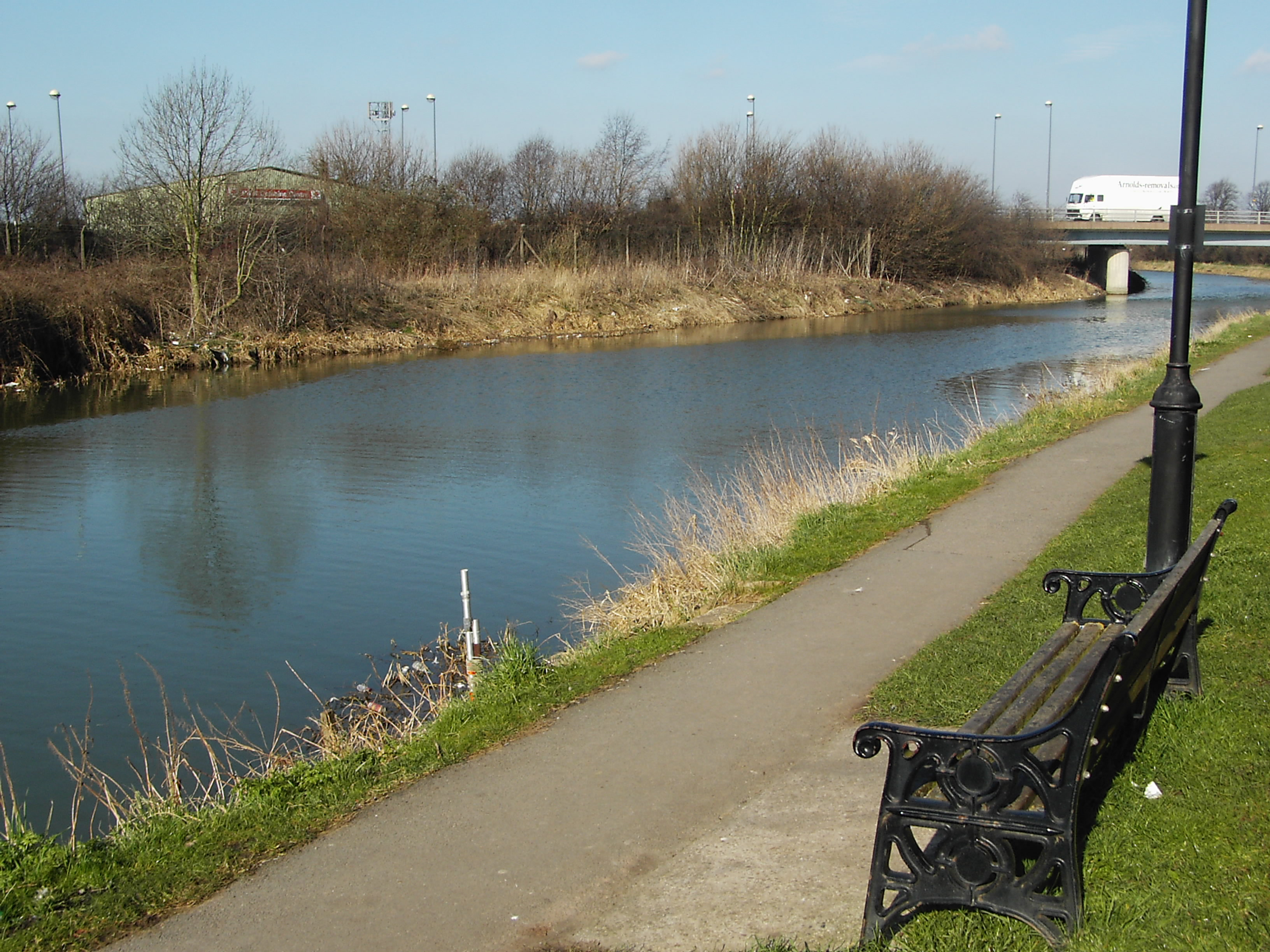
The River Ancholme at Brigg, looking towards the A18 bridge

The towpath crosses from the west bank to the east bank at the bridge. A little further to the east is the Old Tollgate Bridge, a red brick single span with ashlar dressing dating from the late 1700s, which crosses the Old River Ancholme. Continuing northwards, the towpath crosses the entrance to the Caistor Canal, disused since 1877. A 20th century steel span is supported by stone abutments, built around 1785, when the canal opened. The bridge is Grade II listed as is the adjacent first lock, one of five that remain on the Caistor Canal. Hibaldstow Bridge was rebuilt in 1889 to a design by Alfred Atkinson, and the wrought-iron span, which rests on brick piers, was supplied by a company of ironfounders called Messrs Porter and Co of Lincoln. It replaced an earlier wooden swing bridge, dating from Rennie's reconstruction, and the piers from that bridge were probably reused. Atkinson was also responsible for Cadney Bridge, rebuilt in 1882, for which the wrought iron span was supplied by Messrs Goodwin, Jardine and Co of Glasgow. Again, the piers from an earlier bridge were probably reused.

The Anglian Water pumping station, immediately to the north of the bridge, has an unusual wooden roof. Beyond, and slightly set back from the river, Newstead Priory Farm stands on slightly higher land. The house is Grade I listed, and incorporates parts of a 12th-century Gilbertine Priory. Kettleby Beck joins the river from the east, through a set of sluice gates, just before the channel splits in two, with the old river passing through the centre of Brigg and the new one bypassing it to the west, before rejoining to the north of Brigg. They form an island, which is known as Island Carr. There is a marina on the old branch, and the former Manchester, Sheffield and Lincolnshire Railway main line from Gainsborough to Grimsby, now part of the Sheffield to Lincoln Line, crosses both branches. The A18 road also crosses both branches. The bridge over the new branch was designed by John Rennie and built in 1827, with brick flanks and ashlar masonry. The bridge was widened in the 20th century, with the south face being reused once the widening had taken place. The road formerly crossed the old branch at County Bridge, a single span rusticated stone arch erected in 1828. The handrails were replaced in 1951, and the A18 was diverted over a new bridge to the north.

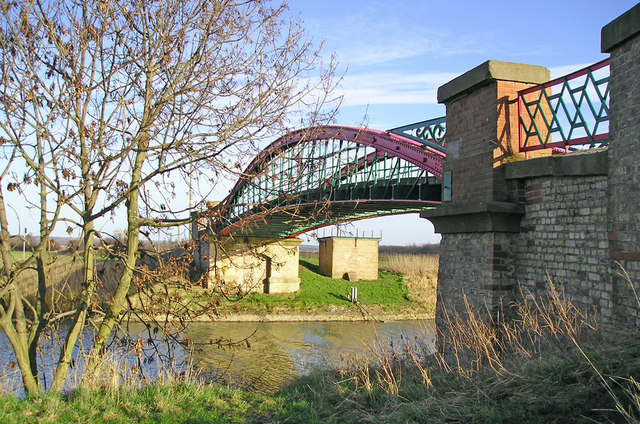
Broughton Bridge is an inverted suspension bridge.

Below the point where the two branches rejoin, a new bridge carries the M180 motorway over the channel. Next come Castlethorpe bridge and Broughton bridge, both maintained by the Environment Agency. Broughton is an inverted suspension bridge, which replaced an earlier bridge in the mid- to late 19th century, but this reused the earlier abutments. The single span is supported by two wrought iron arched ribs, with vertical and diagonal suspension rods, supporting timber decking. Another railway bridge follows, this time linking Scunthorpe to Grimsby, and now carrying trains run by South TransPennine. The intake formerly owned by British Steel plc is on the west bank by the bridge, supplying water to the steel industry in Scunthorpe.

Saxby Bridge is a wrought iron single span with timber decking, dating from the mid-19th century, which is virtually unaltered, apart from minor repairs to the decking. Horkstow Bridge is John Rennie's only known suspension bridge, and is one of the earliest unaltered suspension bridges in Britain. It is Grade II* listed. As the river nears the Humber, a high-level conveyor belt carries material from South Ferriby quarry to the cement works at Ferriby Sluice. The conveyor is 1.25 miles (2.0 km) long, and is used to transfer around 3000 tonnes of crushed chalk and 1,000 tonnes of clay per day. This stretch of the river has numerous moorings, and the Humber Keel & Sloop Preservation Society usually moor their keel Comrade and their sloop Amy Houson just above the final lock. The lock at Ferriby Sluice has two sets of gates: a low level set pointing upstream, and a set of much taller gates pointing downstream which prevent the river being inundated by tides, and allow vessels to leave when the Humber is at a higher level than the Ancholme. In order to minimise the ingress of brackish water into the Ancholme when the tide gates are used, the water is culverted into the West Drain when the lock is being emptied. The sluice consists of three sets of pointed doors, and two electrically operated vertical guillotine gates. Salinity in the river is further controlled by two bubble curtains, and is continuously measured at Saxby, with the information used to decide whether the flow should be supplemented by water from the Trent Witham Ancholme Transfer Scheme.

== See also ==
- Hibaldstow Bridge
- Caistor Canal
- Rivers of the United Kingdom
- Tiddy Mun

== Bibliography ==
- Anderton, Alison (October 2012). "An Ancholme Adventure". Waterways World. ISSN 0309-1422.
- Anon (10 December 1932). "Land Drainage". Nature. 130 (3293): 875. Bibcode:1932Natur.130Q.875.. doi:10.1038/130875a0.
- Boyes, J.; Russell, R. (1977). The Canals of Eastern England. David and Charles. ISBN 978-0-7153-7415-3.
- Butt, R. V. J. (October 1995). The Directory of Railway Stations: details every public and private passenger station, halt, platform and stopping place, past and present (1st ed.). Sparkford: Patrick Stephens Ltd. ISBN 978-1-85260-508-7. OCLC 60251199. OL 11956311M.
- Cumberlidge, Jane (2009). Inland Waterways of Great Britain (8th Ed.). Imray Laurie Norie and Wilson. ISBN 978-1-84623-010-3.
- Dobson, Alban; Hull, Hubert (1931). The Land Drainage Act 1930. Oxford University Press.
- EA (2006). A better place for all – River Ancholme Waterway Plan (PDF). Environment Agency.
- Fisher, Stuart (2013). British River Navigations. Bloomsbury. ISBN 978-1-4729-0084-5.
- Greenhill, Dr Basil; Morrison, Prof John (1995). The Archaeology of Boats and Ships. Conway Maritime Press. ISBN 978-0-85177-652-1.
- HMSO (1963). "Water Resources Act 1963" (PDF). legislation.gov.uk.
- Itinerary (7 June 1996). Lincolnshire Catchment Panel Field Visit (PDF). Environment Agency. Archived from the original (PDF) on 4 March 2016.
- Paget-Tomlinson, Edward (2006). The Illustrated history of Canal and River Navigations. Landmark Publishing Ltd. ISBN 978-1-84306-207-3.
- Solomon, Dr D. J.; Wright, Dr R. (September 2012). Prioritising pumping stations for facilities for the passage of eels and other fish (PDF). Environment Agency, Anglian Region.
- Squires, Roger (2008). Britain's restored canals. Landmark Publishing. ISBN 978-1-84306-331-5.
- Wisdom, A. S. (1966). Land Drainage. London: Sweet & Maxwell.
- Wright, Edward (1990). The Ferriby Boats. Routledge. ISBN 978-0-415-02599-7.
