= Osgodby, Lincolnshire =

Village and civil parish in Lincolnshire, England

Coordinates: 53.420172°N 0.388325°W

Osgodby
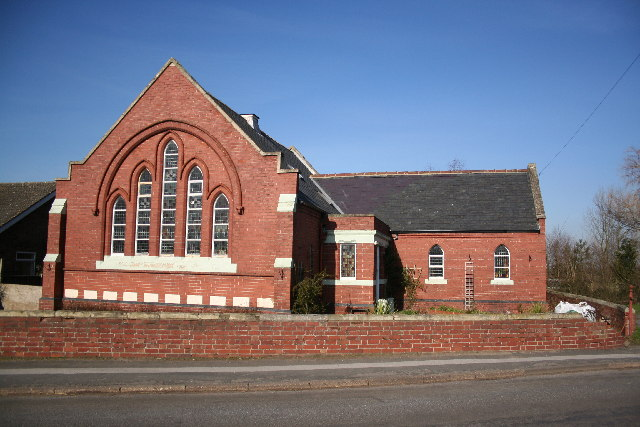
- Osgodby Chapel

- Location within Lincolnshire
- Population: 660 (2011)
- OS grid reference: TF072926
  - London: 130 mi (210 km) S
- District: West Lindsey
- Shire county: Lincolnshire
- Region: East Midlands
- Country: England
- Sovereign state: United Kingdom
- Post town: Market Rasen
- Postcode district: LN8
- Police: Lincolnshire
- Fire: Lincolnshire
- Ambulance: East Midlands
- UK Parliament: Gainsborough

Osgodby is a village and civil parish in the West Lindsey district of Lincolnshire, England. The population of the civil parish, including Kingerby, Kirkby and Usselby, as well as West Rasen in its own civil parish, was 660 at the 2011 census.

Osgodby is close to the A1103 and A46 roads, and 3 miles (5 km) north-west from the market town of Market Rasen. The parish contains the small villages of Kingerby, Kirkby cum Osgodby, Osgodby itself, Usselby and the hamlet of Bishopbridge. To the north is North Owersby. Nearby to the west is the north–south River Ancholme. The population of the parish is 646.

== History ==
At the time of Domesday Book the village consisted of 41 households.

There are medieval settlement remains, including a moat, visible as earthworks and thought to be part of Tournay Manor which was established during the 14th century. In 1424 John Tournay was given as a gift land on the south side of Osgodby, but the principal residence of the family was at Caenby. During the Second World War there was an army camp at Osgodby, and 60 accommodation huts were dispersed within nearby woodland. One building remains at the junction of the A46 – A1103, function unknown, and where the woods border the A1103, Westwards from the A46, many of the foundations are still visible.

== Bishopbridge ==
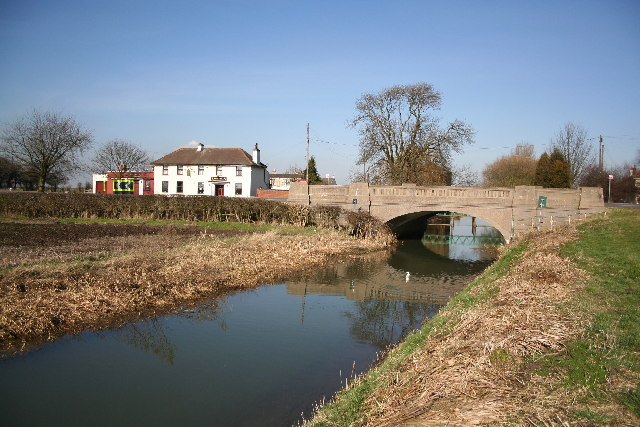
The River Ancholme and The Bell at Bishopbridge

Bishopbridge is a hamlet at the western limit of the parish of Osgodby, on the A631 and is named after the bridge that crosses the River Ancholme at this point. The hamlet consists of a public house and a few farms and houses.

Kirkby-cum-Osgodby Inclosure Act 1803
- Act of Parliament
- Parliament of the United Kingdom
- Long title: An Act for dividing, allotting, and inclosing the Open and Common Fields, Meadows, Pastures, Moors, and other Commonable Lands and Waste Grounds, within the Parish of Kirkby cum Osgodby, in the County of Lincoln.
- Citation: 43 Geo. 3. c. 64 Pr.

Dates
- Royal assent: 11 June 1803

The settlement marks the upper limit of the navigation of the Ancholme, which was created by the River Ancholme Navigation and Drainage Act 1766 (7 Geo. 3. c. 98), which records the location as Bishop Brigys, in the Kirkby-cum-Osgodby Inclosure Act 1803 (43 Geo. 3. c. 64 Pr.) it has changed to Bishop Briggs.

The navigation ends where there is a measurement weir at the gauging station that records the flow of the river. On the adjacent River Rase, another weir and gauging station measures the flow of that river. Both sites are listed as Bishopbridge.

== See also ==
- Osgodby Hoard
- Chapel of Our Lady and St Joseph, Osgodby
- West Rasen
- Kingerby
- Usselby
- Kirkby
