= Rase =

Rase may refer to:

== People ==
- Ann-Sofie Rase
- Betty Jane Rase, also known as B. J. Baker, Miss America competitor
- Laurence Rase (born 1977), Belgian taekwondo practitioner

== Places ==
- River Rase, England

== Organisations ==
- Royal Agricultural Society of England
