= Kingerby =

Village and former civil parish in the West Lindsey district of Lincolnshire, England

Coordinates: 53.421681°N 0.41004°W

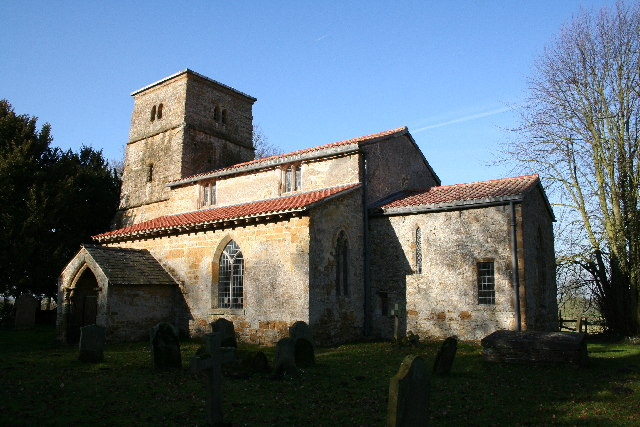
- St Peter's Church, Kingerby

- Location within Lincolnshire
- OS grid reference: TF057928
  - London: 135 mi (217 km) S
- Civil parish: Osgodby
- District: West Lindsey
- Shire county: Lincolnshire
- Region: East Midlands
- Country: England
- Sovereign state: United Kingdom
- Post town: Market Rasen
- Postcode district: LN8
- Police: Lincolnshire
- Fire: Lincolnshire
- Ambulance: East Midlands
- UK Parliament: Gainsborough

Kingerby is a village and former civil parish, now in the parish of Osgodby, in the West Lindsey district of Lincolnshire, England. It is situated 5 miles (8.0 km) north west from the town of Market Rasen. The hamlet of Bishop Bridge lies about 1.5 miles (2.4 km) to the south-west. In 1931 the parish had a population of 75. On 1 April 1936 the parish was abolished to form Osgodby.

The parish church is dedicated to Saint Peter and is a Grade I listed building cared for by The Churches Conservation Trust; it became redundant in 1981. It dates from the early 11th century and is built of Ironstone. There are three monuments in the church to 13th- and 14th-century knights. There are also several marble tablets to the Young family of Kingerby Hall. To the north and east of the church are scheduled earthworks of an ecclesiastical enclosure in which Elsham Priory was located.

Kingerby Hall, or Manor, is a Grade II listed building dating from 1812. It is situated on the scheduled site of a motte and bailey castle and a later moated manor house. The castle was built sometime prior to 1216, in which year it burnt down. In the 12th and 13th centuries a village grew up around the castle, but in the 17th century the village population declined.
