= Chapel of Our Lady and St Joseph, Osgodby =

Coordinates: 53.419376°N 0.382566°W

Chapel of Our Lady and St Joseph
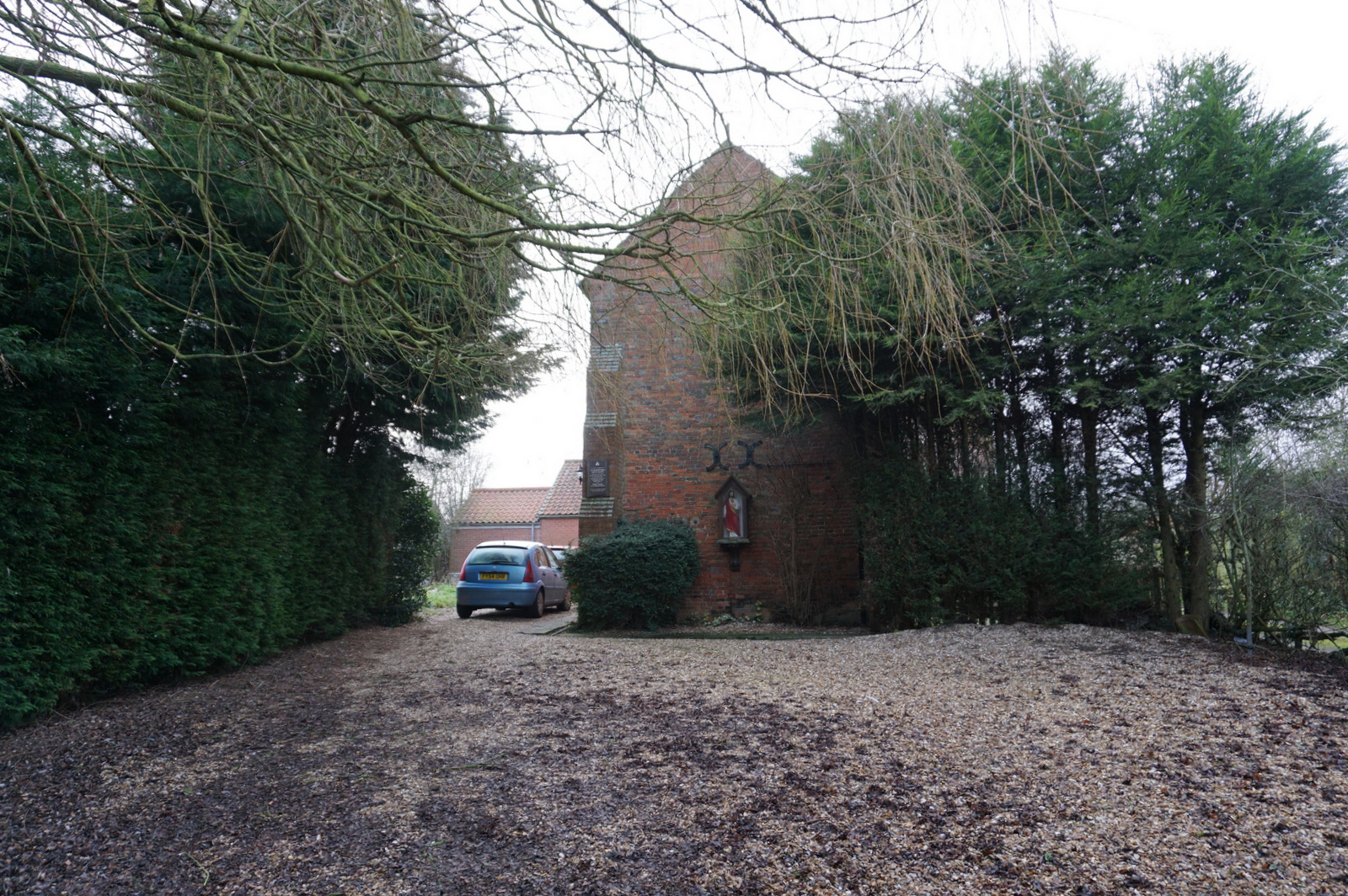
- Chapel of Our Lady and St Joseph
- OS grid reference: TF 07591 92598
- Country: England
- Denomination: Catholic
- Website: https://holyroodcatholicchurch.org.uk

Architecture
- Years built: 1793

Administration
- Province: Westminster
- Diocese: Nottingham
- Deanery: Northern Lincolnshire
- Parish: Market Rasen

Clergy
- Bishop: Right Revd. Patrick McKinney
- Priest: Fr David Palmer

The Chapel of Our Lady and St Joseph is an 18th Century Roman Catholic chapel of ease located in Osgodby, Lincolnshire. It is served from Holy Rood Church in Market Rasen and is the oldest surviving church in the Diocese of Nottingham.

== History ==
The church was built in 1793, two years after the passing of the Roman Catholic Relief Act 1791. To avoid local hostilities, the chapel was designed to be discreet, and resembles a house. The building was extended in 1850, from an L shaped plan to a T shaped plan, through the extension of the southern presbytery range.The chapel's ownership was transferred to the Diocese of Nottingham in 1861 and it was listed in 1976.
