= Toft Newton =

Civil parish in the West Lindsey district of Lincolnshire, England

Coordinates: 53.373194°N 0.423063°W

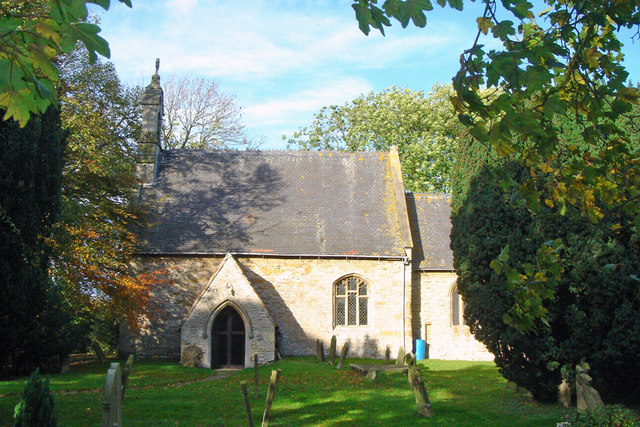
- St Michael's Church, Newton by Toft

- Location within Lincolnshire
- Population: 457 (2011)
- OS grid reference: TF050874
  - London: 140 mi (230 km) S
- District: West Lindsey
- Shire county: Lincolnshire
- Region: East Midlands
- Country: England
- Sovereign state: United Kingdom
- Post town: Market Rasen
- Postcode district: LN8
- Police: Lincolnshire
- Fire: Lincolnshire
- Ambulance: East Midlands
- UK Parliament: Gainsborough

Toft Newton is a civil parish in the West Lindsey district of Lincolnshire, England. It consists of the hamlets of Toft next Newton and Newton by Toft, and the small village of Newtoft. It is 4 miles (6 km) west from Market Rasen. According to the 2001 Census it had a population of 522, decreasing to 457 at the 2011 census.

The church of St Michael in Newton by Toft dates from the 12th century and was extensively rebuilt in 1860 by James Fowler. St Peter and Paul Church in Toft next Newton was originally built in the thirteenth century, but was extensively remodelled in 1891 by Hodgson Fowler. It is a grade II listed building, but was closed in 1986 and was sold for residential use in 1989.

Toft Newton Reservoir on the upper reaches of the River Ancholme attracts fishing, particularly for trout, and bird watching. The reservoir covers 41 acres (16.5 ha), and is supplied with water from Short Ferry, on the River Witham, through a 10.6-mile (17 km) pipeline. It is used to maintain flows in the Ancholme during the summer months, and is regularly stocked with rainbow trout and brown trout. Facilities include a "wheelyboat", which is designed to allow wheelchair users to access the fishery.
