= Usselby =

Hamlet in the West Lindsey district of Lincolnshire, England

Coordinates: 53.428578°N 0.350416°W

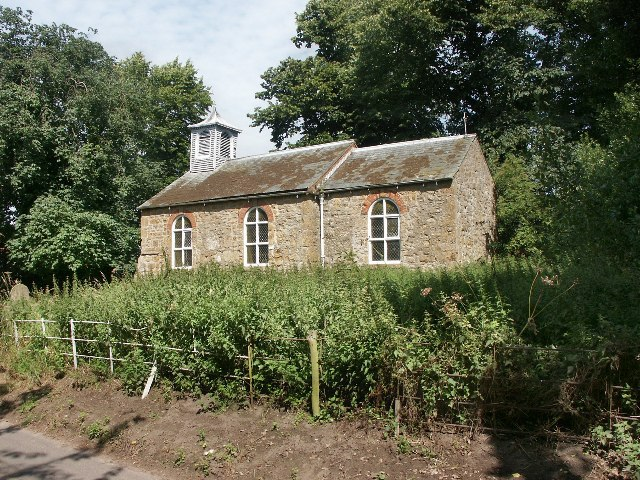
- Church of St Margaret, Usselby

- Location within Lincolnshire
- OS grid reference: TF097936
  - London: 155 mi (249 km) S
- Civil parish: Osgodby
- District: West Lindsey
- Shire county: Lincolnshire
- Region: East Midlands
- Country: England
- Sovereign state: United Kingdom
- Post town: Market Rasen
- Postcode district: LN8
- Police: Lincolnshire
- Fire: Lincolnshire
- Ambulance: East Midlands
- UK Parliament: Gainsborough

Usselby is a hamlet in the civil parish of Osgodby, in the West Lindsey district of Lincolnshire, England. It is approximately 3 miles (5 km) north-west from the town of Market Rasen. In 1931 the parish had a population of 54. On 1 April 1936 the parish was abolished to form Osgodby.

The parish church is dedicated to Saint Margaret, and is a Grade II listed building dating from the 14th century and 1749, with 1889 alterations, in ironstone with red brick, by Hodgson Fowler of Sheffield. Over the west door is a tablet inscribed "Queen Ann's bounty fell to this church in MDCCXLIX." The early 18th-century Queen Anne's Bounty acts of parliament provided extra income for poor incumbents.

Usselby Hall is also a Grade II listed building, dating from the mid-18th century with early 19th-century alterations and additions, and built with red brick. It was owned and lived in by Lord Tennyson's grandfather. During the Second World War it was used as a German Officer prisoner-of-war camp. Usselby Hall now covers most of the site of the Usselby deserted medieval village.

Claxby and Usselby railway station opened here in 1848 and closed in 1960.
