= RSMA =

RSMA, RSM-A and similar may refer to:

- Regenerative Satellite Mesh - A, internationally standardized satellite communications protocol
- Regimental Sergeant Major of the Army (RSM-A)
- Reverse polarity SMA connector (RSMA, RPSMA or RP-SMA)
- Road Safety Markings Association, a British trade association
- Royal Society of Marine Artists

== See also ==
- RSMAS
