= Kirkby cum Osgodby =

Hamlet and former civil parish in the West Lindsey district of Lincolnshire, England

Coordinates: 53.420792°N 0.401241°W

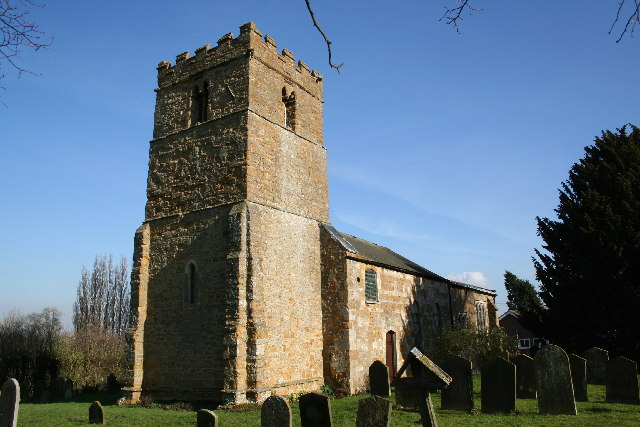
- St Andrew's Church

- Location within Lincolnshire
- OS grid reference: TF063927
  - London: 135 mi (217 km) S
- Civil parish: Osgodby
- District: West Lindsey
- Shire county: Lincolnshire
- Region: East Midlands
- Country: England
- Sovereign state: United Kingdom
- Post town: Market Rasen
- Postcode district: LN8
- Police: Lincolnshire
- Fire: Lincolnshire
- Ambulance: East Midlands
- UK Parliament: Gainsborough

Kirkby cum Osgodby, sometimes called Kirkby, is hamlet and former civil parish, now in the parish of Osgodby, in the West Lindsey district of Lincolnshire, England. It lies 3.5 miles (5.6 km) north-west from Market Rasen and less than 1 mile (1.6 km) west from the village of Osgodby.

In 1931 the parish had a population of 322. On 1 April 1936 the parish was abolished to form Osgodby. This successor council now styles itself Kirkby cum Osgodby.

== Church ==
The church at Kirkby, dedicated to Saint Andrew and dating from the early 13th century and 1790, is built of limestone and ironstone. The nave was rebuilt in 1825, and the church restored in 1891, 1900 and 1923.

The base of a medieval limestone cross in the churchyard dates from the 14th century, and is both Grade II listed and an ancient scheduled monument.
