= Claxby and Usselby railway station =

Former railway station in Lincolnshire, England

Coordinates: 53.42398°N 0.34020°W

Claxby & Usselby
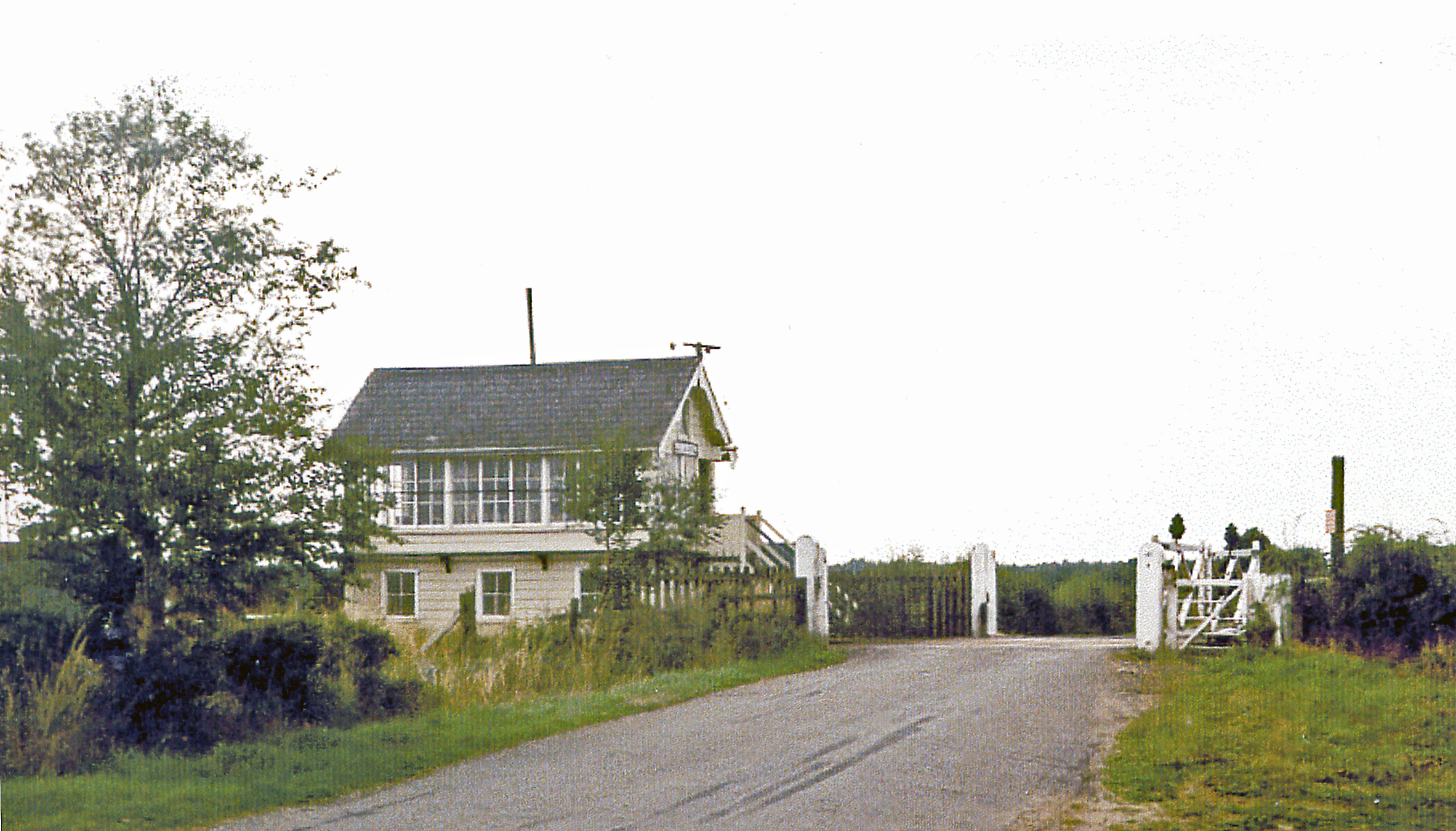
- Signalbox and level-crossing at Claxby & Usselby

General information
- Location: Claxby and Usselby, Lincolnshire, England
- Platforms: 2

Other information
- Status: Disused

History
- Original company: Manchester, Sheffield and Lincolnshire Railway
- Pre-grouping: Great Central Railway
- Post-grouping: London and North Eastern Railway

Key dates
- 1 November 1848: Opened as Usselby
- 1 July 1897: renamed Claxby & Usselby
- 7 March 1960: Closed
Location

Claxby and Usselby railway station was a station that served the hamlets of Claxby and Usselby in Lincolnshire, England. It was opened in 1848 on a branch line of the Great Grimsby and Sheffield Junction Railway to Market Rasen but closed in 1960.

Preceding station	Disused railways	Following station
Market Rasen	Great Central Railway	Holton Le Moor
