= Brecks =

Suburb of Rotherham in South Yorkshire, England

Coordinates: 53.42°N 01.30°W

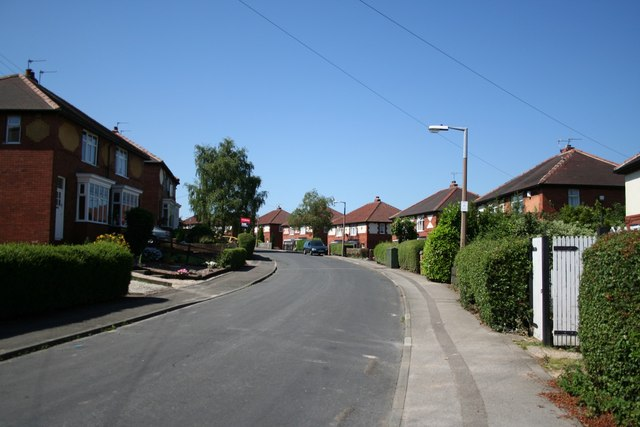
- Brecks Crescent, a residential street in the suburb

- Location within South Yorkshire
- OS grid reference: SK4692
- Metropolitan borough: Rotherham
- Metropolitan county: South Yorkshire
- Region: Yorkshire and the Humber
- Country: England
- Sovereign state: United Kingdom
- Police: South Yorkshire
- Fire: South Yorkshire
- Ambulance: Yorkshire

Brecks is a suburb of Rotherham in South Yorkshire, England. It is situated roughly 2 miles (3.2 km) from central Rotherham. Brecks borders the suburb Wickersley. The A631 road, here called Bawtry Road, forms the southern boundary of the built-up area.

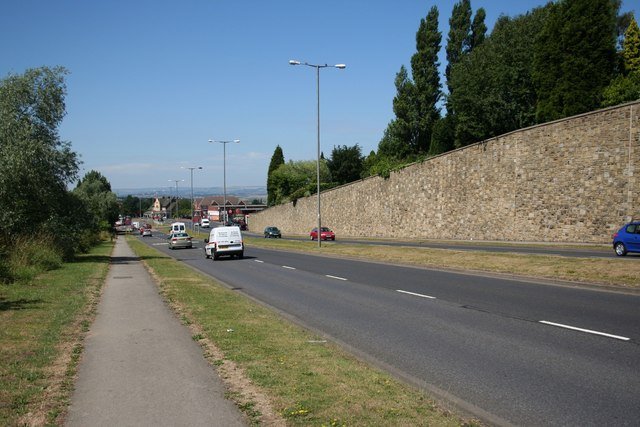
A631 at Brecks
