= Tealby =

Village and civil parish in the West Lindsey district of Lincolnshire, England

Coordinates: 53.400840°N 0.264080°W

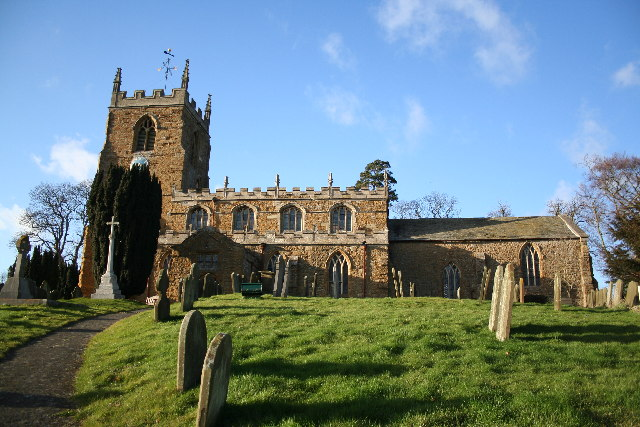
- All Saints' Church, Tealby

- Location within Lincolnshire
- Population: 593 (20`11)
- OS grid reference: TF155907
  - London: 130 mi (210 km) S
- Civil parish: Tealby
- District: West Lindsey
- Shire county: Lincolnshire
- Region: East Midlands
- Country: England
- Sovereign state: United Kingdom
- Post town: Market Rasen
- Postcode district: LN8
- Dialling code: 01673
- Police: Lincolnshire
- Fire: Lincolnshire
- Ambulance: East Midlands
- UK Parliament: Gainsborough

Tealby is a village and civil parish in the West Lindsey district of Lincolnshire, England, situated on the edge of the Lincolnshire Wolds and 3 miles (5 km) north-east of Market Rasen. The population of the civil parish at the 2011 census was 593.

== Community ==
Tealby is noted for the Tennyson-d'Eyncourt family, which provided the village hall and school. In the 1980s the school was used for filming the programme Nanny.

In the early 2000s the village was granted permission for a shop to be built, now run by volunteers. The village post office was threatened with closure but it is open at certain times of the week. Tealby church, built using local orange-iron stone, is dedicated to All Saints and dates back to the 12th century; it holds memorials to the Tennyson-d'Eyncourt family. Tealby residents included Bernie Taupin, who lived on Beck Hill (Elton John recorded a song about "Tealby Abbey" on Regimental Sgt. Zippo).

The King's Head, one of two public houses in the village, is one of the oldest in the country and retains a thatched roof.

Tealby has a Bowls Club and a Lawn Tennis Club, the courts of which are a facility for the wider district, the club promoting a Young Leaders Tennis Course and competitions. The village hall, run by a committee, is used for parties, social events, playgroups, school events and meetings.

=== Bayons Manor ===
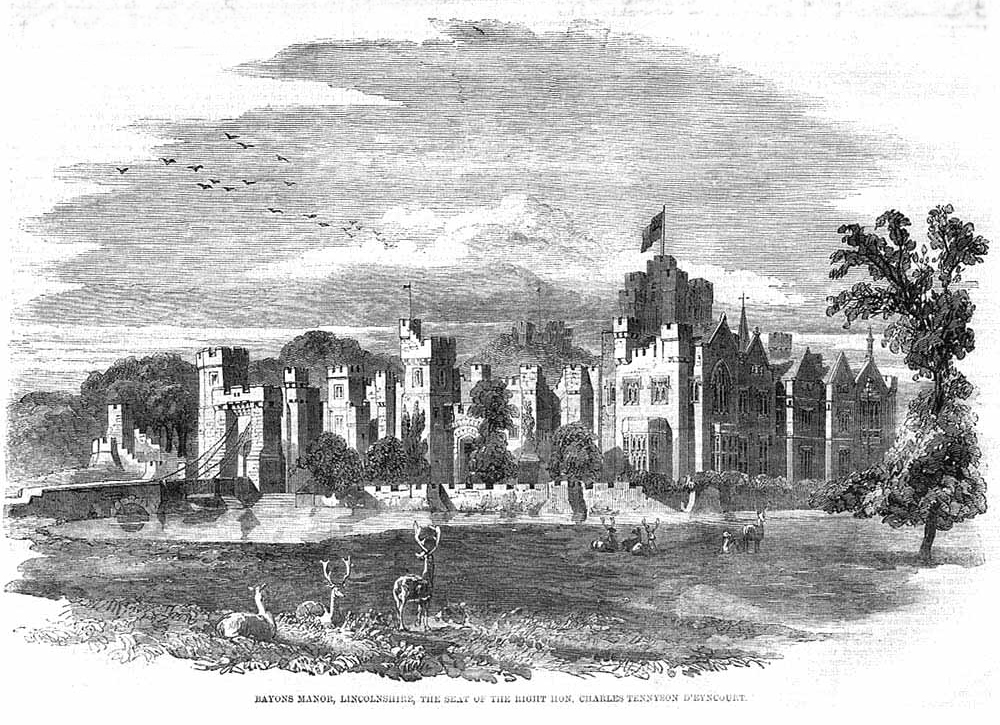
Bayons Manor, 1859

Tealby's Bayons Manor was owned by Charles Tennyson, later Tennyson-d'Eyncourt, the uncle of Alfred, Lord Tennyson. Bayons Manor house was built between 1836 and 1842 for Tennyson d'Eyncourt, to designs by William Adams Nicholson and with contributions made by Anthony Salvin. It consisted of castellated mansion with a moat, machicolated and embattled towers, curtain-wall and great hall with a hammer-beam roof. It was situated on rising ground to provide a picturesque scene and to give the widest views. The house was occupied by troops during the Second World War, and was sold in 1944. The estate was purchased by a local farmer, primarily for the farmland since the house was already derelict and becoming dangerous. Because of its condition a subsequent owner had it blown up in 1964. Bayons Manor was a rare example of a Victorian stately home in the style of a moated castle.

=== Tealby Thorpe ===
This hamlet is a short distance south-west of Tealby village. It has a watermill on the River Rase, and also boasts a couple of fords.

== Tealby Hoard ==
In 1807 a ploughman working for George Tennyson uncovered an earthenware pot containing a hoard of some 6,000 silver coins. These were examined by Sir Joseph Banks, 604 retained for collectors and reference and 5,127 melted down at the Tower Mint. The Tealby pennies have been historically important in numismatics, showing development of Medieval coinage in England.

== Etymology ==
For a long time the placename Tealby has been attributed to Anglo-Saxon tæfl/tefl "gaming-board", here for a square piece of land, plus Old Norse -bȳ "dwelling". But there are old spellings Tavelesbi, Tauelesbi and Teflesbi, and the Anglo-Saxon word tæfl is feminine and so its genitive would be tæfle, and therefore Caitlin Green suggests that the name refers to some Taifali (a horse-riding Germanic or Sarmatian people) who invaded Gaul or were brought into Gaul by Romans as mercenaries and later crossed to Britain with the Anglo-Saxons.
