= Osgodby Hoard =

Coordinates: 53.417°N 0.383°W

The Osgodby Hoard is a Romano-British hoard of coins and metalwork found near Osgodby, Lincolnshire in 1999. The hoard was discovered in 1999 during engineering works on farmland and comprises 44 coins, a brooch and an intaglio. It is now in the collection of the British Museum.
