= Glanford Brigg Power Station =

Gas-fired power station in North Lincolnshire, England

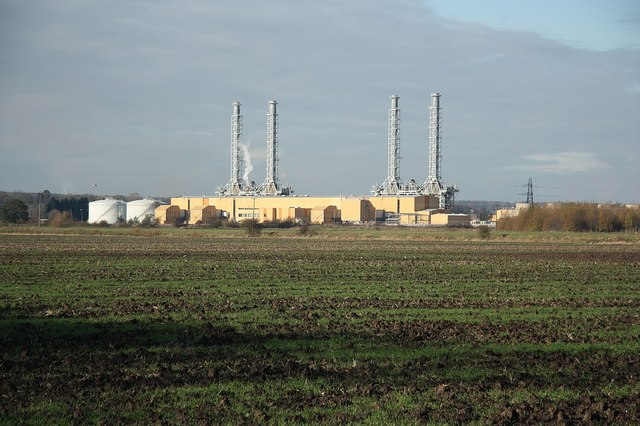
- Glanford Brigg Power Station; Viewed from the east in November 2009
- Country: England, United Kingdom
- Location: North Lincolnshire, Yorkshire and the Humber
- Coordinates: 53.540577°N 0.503635°W
- Status: Operational
- Construction began: 1991
- Commission date: 1993
- Operators: Fortum (1993–2002); Centrica Brigg (2002–present)

Thermal power station
- Primary fuel: Natural gas
- Secondary fuel: Diesel fuel
- Combined cycle?: Yes

Power generation
- Units operational: 6 x 40 MW
- Make and model: General Electric; Alstom
- Nameplate capacity: 240 MW

External links
- Commons: Related media on Commons

Glanford Brigg Power Station (also known as Brigg Power Station) is a gas-fired power station in North Lincolnshire, England. It is capable of firing diesel as a substitute of natural gas. It is situated on the River Ancholme, beside the Sheffield to Cleethorpes via Brigg Line, outside the town of Brigg, with its name coming from the former name for the town. It has a generating capacity of 240 megawatts (MW).

Opened in 1993, the station was originally operated by Finnish company Fortum. It is now operated by Centrica. There are currently plans to build a straw fuelled renewable energy plant alongside the station.

== History ==
Construction of the power station started in late 1991. It was opened in December 1993. It was built just south of a former British Sugar sugar beet factory, which is the planned location of Brigg Renewable Energy Plant, by European Gas Turbines (EGT), which was a division of GEC Alsthom. GEC Alsthom won the £90m contract in March 1991. Initially, it was owned by Yorkshire Electricity, but operated by a Finnish company, Fortum, under the name Regional Power Generators Ltd.

RPG was a joint venture between Yorkshire Electricity and Newcastle upon Tyne-based Berisford Bristar. YE took 75% control in January 1991, with Total Gas Marketing owning the rest. The gas was supplied by British Gas. In 2000 it was bought by Fortum. In June 2002 the plant was bought by Centrica for £37 million. The operating company is known as Centrica Brigg Ltd.

== Operations ==
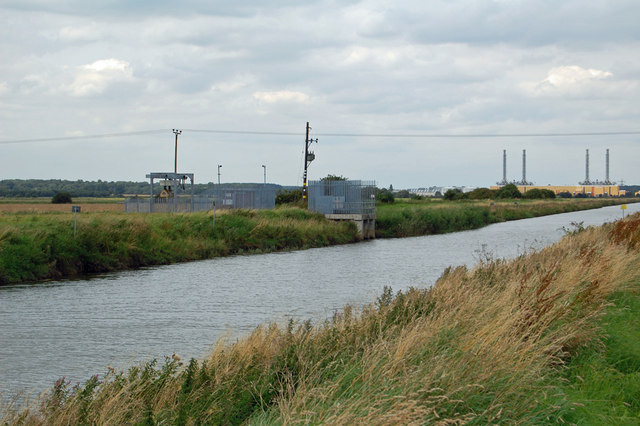
Its position next to the River Ancholme

Glanford Brigg power station is a natural gas fuelled, combined cycle gas turbine power station with four gas turbines, four Stein Industrie heat recovery steam generators (HRSGs), and two 40 MW GEC Alsthom steam turbines, divided into two modules. It can produce 240 MW of base load electricity and 272 MW at peak load, from a thermal input of around 515 MW. In the event of interruption of main fuel supply, it can burn diesel instead.

It can run at a maximum thermal efficiency of 46.8% when on constant running; the actual efficiency depends on factors in the local weather conditions such as temperature and humidity. It is used to fulfill peak load requirements from the National Grid, as the electricity output can be decreased when demand is less. Each gas turbine and both steam turbines are connected to a 40 MW electrical generator (alternator).

The station's four flue gas stacks are 70 m (230 ft) high. The gas turbines are a General Electric Frame 6 MS6001B type, producing 39.16 MW at 31.6% thermal efficiency. They rotate at 5,135 revolutions per minute (rpm), and are connected via a gearbox to the electrical generator revolving at 3,000 rpm. Exhaust gas reaches the steam generator at 541 °C. The gas turbine electrical generators are rated at 50.2 MVA, with a terminal voltage of 11 kilovolts (kV). The electricity enters the National Grid via a transformer at 132 kV.

The station falls within the supply area formerly ran by Yorkshire Electricity, with distribution currently run by Northern Powergrid. The site employs thirty six people.
