= Heapham =

Village and civil parish in the West Lindsey district of Lincolnshire, England

Coordinates: 53.384407°N 0.685094°W

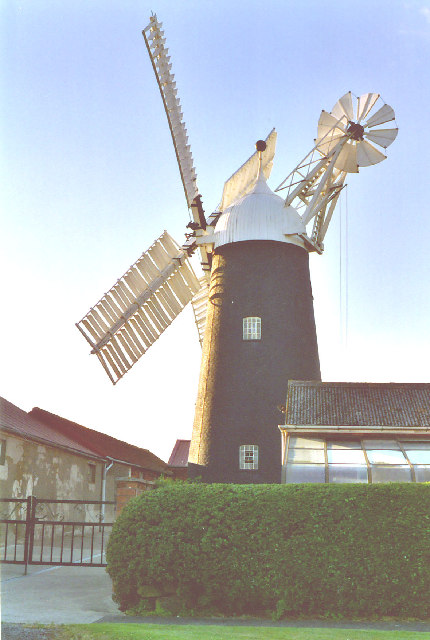
- Heapham windmill

- Location within Lincolnshire
- OS grid reference: SK875883
  - London: 135 mi (217 km) S
- Unitary authority: West Lindsey
- Ceremonial county: Lincolnshire
- Region: East Midlands
- Country: England
- Sovereign state: United Kingdom
- Post town: Gainsborough
- Postcode district: DN21
- Dialling code: 01427
- Police: Lincolnshire
- Fire: Lincolnshire
- Ambulance: East Midlands
- UK Parliament: Gainsborough

Heapham is a village and civil parish in the West Lindsey district of Lincolnshire, England, and 5 miles (8.0 km) south-east from Gainsborough.

According to A Dictionary of British Place Names, Heapham derives from the Old English for "homestead or enclosure where rose-hips or brambles grow", being hēope or hēopa with hām or hamm.

Heapham is recorded in the 1872 White's Directory as a scattered village and parish with a population of 141, and of 1,250 acres (5.1 km^{2}) of land in the Soke of Kirton. All Saints Church had been restored in 1869–70 at a cost of £400. The incumbency was a rectory valued at £361 and included a residence, under the patronage of Lieutenant-colonel Weston Cracroft Amcotts M.P. The Heapham entry included the small Wesleyan chapel, built 1842. Professions and trades listed in 1872 included the parish rector, a corn miller, a farm bailiff, and thirteen farmers, one of whom was a parish overseer, and another a carter and carrier; the carrier [transporting goods and occasionally people] operated between the village and Gainsborough.

Heapham Anglican Grade II listed parish church is dedicated to All Saints. The church tower is of Saxon origin; the main body, Norman. The church was restored in 1868. The churchyard contains the war grave of a Sherwood Foresters soldier of the First World War.

Two chapels were built by Wesleyan Methodists, one in 1842 the other, Grade II listed, in 1897. Other listed buildings include Heapham Windmill, described as "The most complete windmill in West Lindsey".
