= West Rasen =

Village and civil parish in the West Lindsey district of Lincolnshire, England

Coordinates: 53.389359°N 0.402103°W

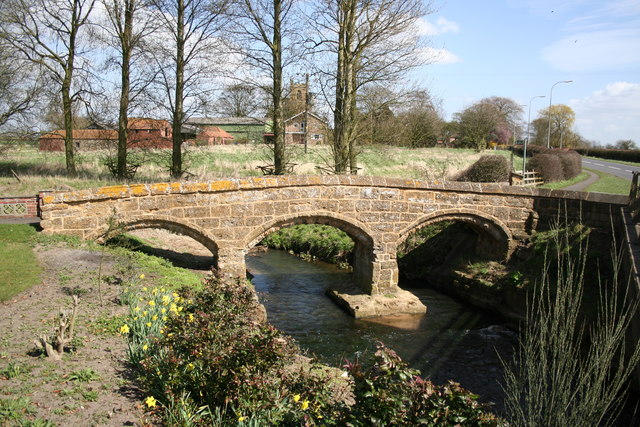
- Packhorse Bridge

- Location within Lincolnshire
- Population: 81 (2021 census)
- OS grid reference: TF063892
  - London: 130 mi (210 km) S
- District: West Lindsey
- Shire county: Lincolnshire
- Region: East Midlands
- Country: England
- Sovereign state: United Kingdom
- Post town: Market Rasen
- Postcode district: LN8
- Police: Lincolnshire
- Fire: Lincolnshire
- Ambulance: East Midlands
- UK Parliament: Gainsborough (UK Parliament constituency)

West Rasen is a village and civil parish in the West Lindsey district of Lincolnshire, England. It is situated on the A631 road, and approximately 3 miles (5 km) west from Market Rasen. In 2021 the parish had a population of 81.

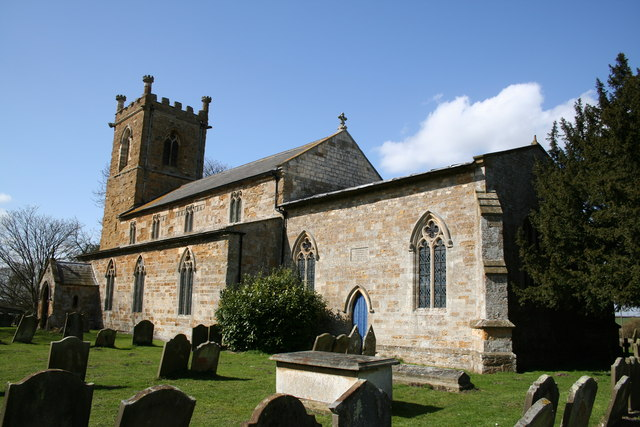
All Saints' Church

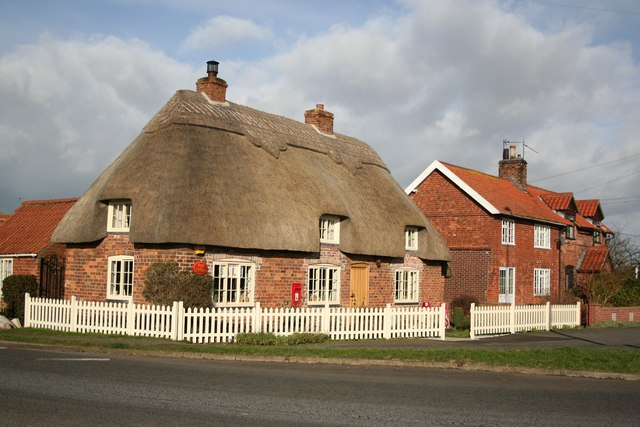
West Rasen Post Office

The name 'Rasen' derives from the Old English ræsn meaning 'at the planks' probably indicating a bridge over the River Rasen.

The parish church is a Grade I listed building dedicated to All Saints, dating from the 11th century, and built from ironstone. The font is 15th-century, and the former north aisle chapel was a chantry founded in 1373 for John Pouger and dissolved in 1548. The churchyard cross is 14th-century, although it was restored in the 19th century, and is both Grade II listed and a scheduled monument.

Packhorse Bridge is a Grade II* ironstone listed bridge over the River Rase, which dates from the 15th century with 20th-century alterations. It consists of a narrow bridge with 3 arches and cobbled surface. It is a scheduled monument.

The Post Office is a Grade II listed former cottage, now shop and house, dating from the late 17th century with 20th-century alterations and additions. It is likely to have been mud and stud originally, but is now underbuilt in red brick with a thatched roof.
