= River Rase =

River in Lincolnshire, England

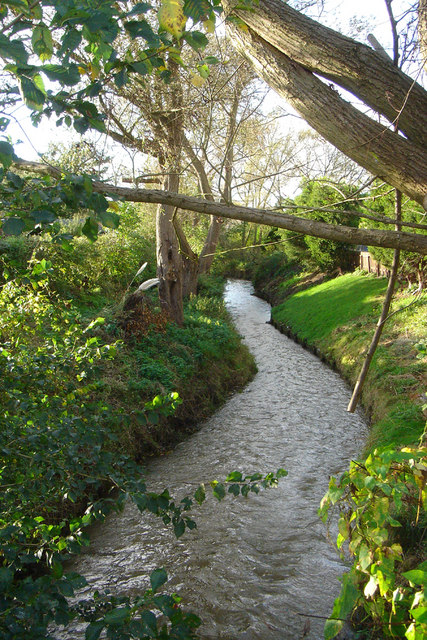
- River Rase near Middle Rasen

Location
- Country: United Kingdom
- Country within the UK: England
- Counties: Lincolnshire
- Town: Market Rasen
- Villages: Tealby, Middle Rasen, West Rasen

Physical characteristics
- Source
  - location: Churn Water Heads, Tealby, Lincolnshire
  - coordinates: 53.4159°N 0.2566°W
  - elevation: 118 m (387 ft)
- Mouth
  - location: River Ancholme near Snitterby, Lincolnshire
  - coordinates: 53.4390°N 0.4667°W
  - elevation: 4 m (13 ft)
- Length: 25 km (16 mi)
- Basin size: 67 km^{2} (26 sq mi)
- Discharge
  - location: Bishopbridge
  - average: 0.48 m^{3}/s (17 cu ft/s)

Basin features
- Tributaries
  - right: Brimmer Beck, The Dale

The River Rase is a 16 mile (25 km) long tributary of the River Ancholme that flows through Lincolnshire, in the east of England.

== Course ==
The source of the river is a series of springs known as Churn Water Heads, that occur on Bully Hill north of Tealby in the Lincolnshire Wolds. These springs occur where the permeable chalk geology of the Wolds meets the impermeable mudstone and clays that underlie most of the Rase catchment.

The river flows in a south-westerly direction through the village of Tealby, where it is crossed by the Viking Way, a long-distance footpath that crosses the Wolds. To the west the Rase reaches the market town of Market Rasen, from which the river takes its name, and where it meets a tributary that flows through the local racecourse. The river continues through the villages of Middle Rasen and then West Rasen, where it is spanned by a packhorse bridge. At the hamlet of Bishopbridge the river changes character, becoming an artificial drainage channel that runs in parallel with the Ancholme. As it flows further north the river also loses its identity becoming the East Drain, when it is joined by the Kingerby Beck. The waters of the Rase and the Ancholme eventually join together near Harlam Hill, to the south of Snitterby Carr.

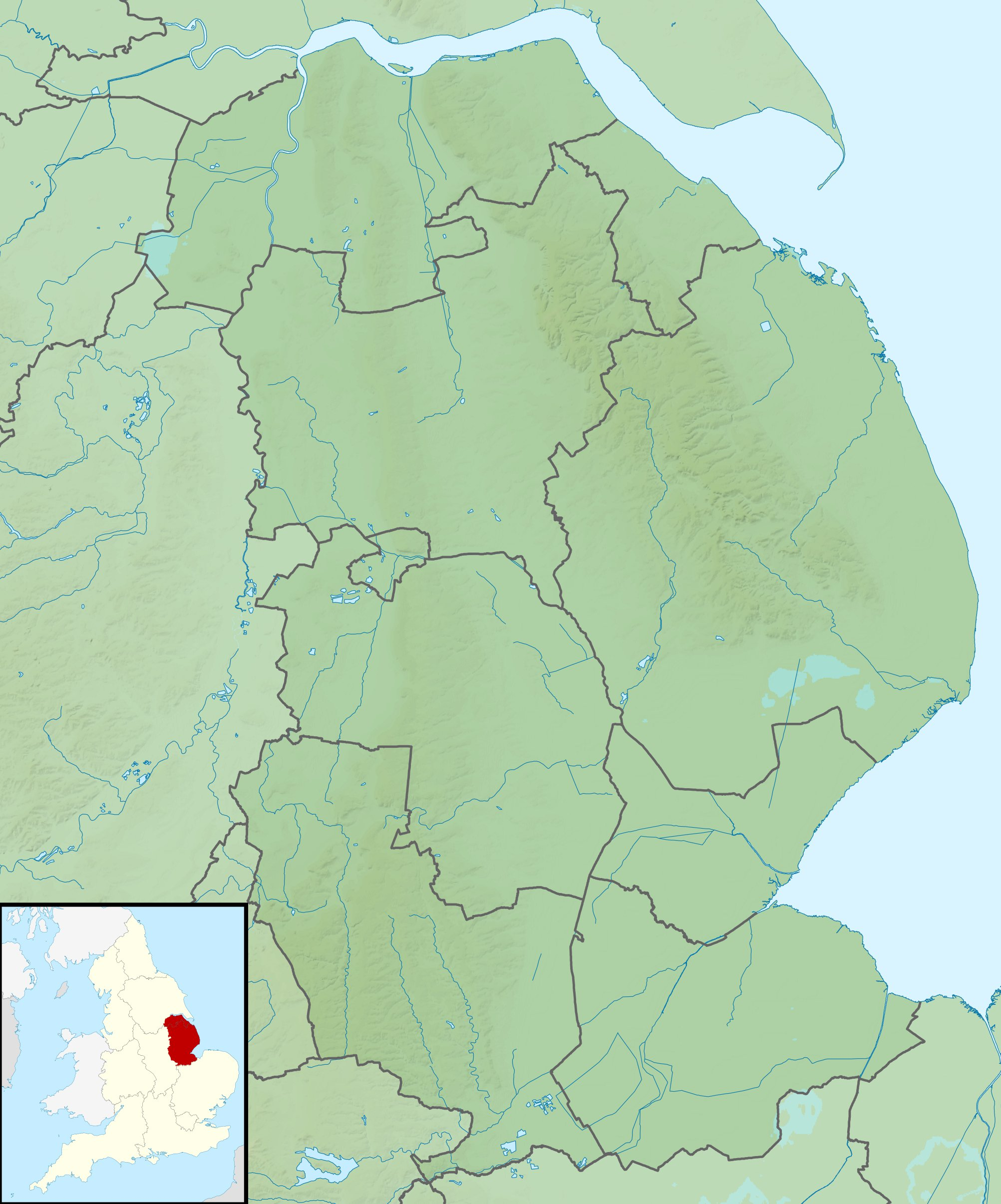
Map showing locations along its course in Lincolnshire
