= Middle Rasen =

Village in Lincolnshire, England

Coordinates: 53.387129°N 0.362506°W

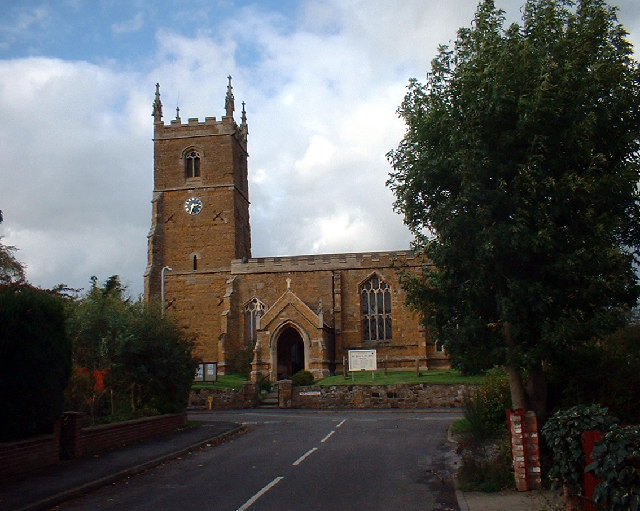
- St Peter’s Church, Middle Rasen

- Location within Lincolnshire
- Population: 2,043 (2011)
- OS grid reference: TF089890
  - London: 130 mi (210 km) S
- District: West Lindsey
- Shire county: Lincolnshire
- Region: East Midlands
- Country: England
- Sovereign state: United Kingdom
- Post town: Market Rasen
- Postcode district: LN8
- Police: Lincolnshire
- Fire: Lincolnshire
- Ambulance: East Midlands
- UK Parliament: Gainsborough

Middle Rasen is a village and civil parish in the West Lindsey district of Lincolnshire, England, located about 1.5 miles (2.4 km) west from the town of Market Rasen. The population of the civil parish at the 2011 census was 2,043.

== History ==
Rasen is mentioned in Domesday Book of 1086, but West Rasen, Middle Rasen and Market Rasen are indistinguishable. In its entirety the list includes ten separate references to Rasen, which as a whole consists of 144 households.

Today's village results from the merger of the two historic villages of Middle Rasen Drax and Middle Rasen Tupholme.

Middle Rasen has had two churches. A church dedicated to St Paul Middle Rasen Drax took part of its name from the parent house of Drax Priory in Yorkshire. In 1846 St Paul's comprised a nave, chancel, South aisle and western tower, with the probable remains of a demolished north aisle and north chapel. – it was demolished in 1860, with parts of its fabric used to restore of the church of St Peter. Grade II* listed St Peter's church dates from the 12th century, with later alterations and additions, and an 1861 restoration by Pearson Bellamy and John Spence Hardy, of Lincoln.

In 1885 Kelly's Directory noted village Wesleyan, Primitive Methodist, and Reformed Wesleyan chapels. It described a parish land of sand and clay, with a clay subsoil, on which wheat, barley and turnips were grown, and with pasture. Parish area was 3,550 acres (14 km^{2}), supporting an 1881 population of 928. There were 17 farmers listed, four of whom had added trades, variously a miller, cattle dealer, butcher & cattle dealer, and machine owner. Other occupations were a blacksmith, beer retailer & blacksmith, millwright, grocer, shopkeeper, wheelwright, carrier, grocer & draper, butcher & cattle dealer, miller, publican, and dressmaker, and a shoemaker who also ran the post office.

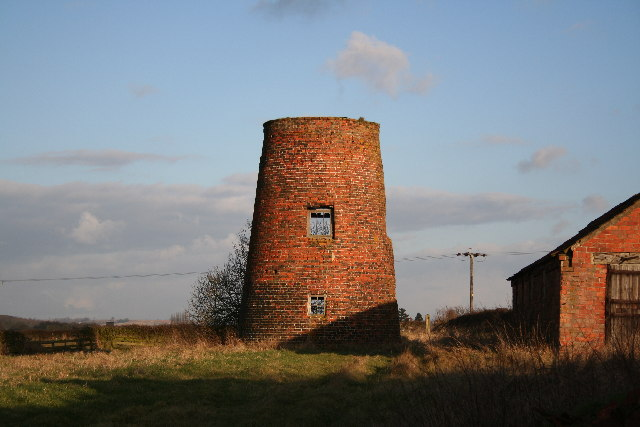
Middle Rasen Mill

A tower windmill, built in 1827 for the grinding of cereal, ceased working permanently in 1925, and is now used as a store. A previous three storey red-brick watermill dated from the late 18th century, with 1827 remodelling – its remaining wheelhouse is Grade II listed.

Middle Rasen Primary School was built in 1875 to replace a charity school founded through a bequest by John Wilkinson, who died in 1720. In 1878 the school became a Board School, and in 1903 the Middle Rasen Council School. The charity still supports the current school.

== Community ==
The ecclesiastical parish is part of The Middle Rasen Group of the Deanery of West Wold. The 2013 incumbent is The Revd Charles Patrick. Since the demolition of one church the other has carried both dedications, and is known to the Diocese as Drax St Peter & St Paul. The parish maintains a modern church hall which is used by the village. To mark the Millennium a new clock, new bell frame, and three additional bells were installed.

The Middle Rasen Methodist church maintains a chapel on Gainsborough Road. The Anglican and Methodist churches hold joint services at a former RAF base 4 miles (6.4 km) away.

The Bowling club maintains a Bowling Green on Church Street. The village has numerous sports and social clubs, including a Cricket Club and a Horticultural Society.
