= Road Safety Markings Association =

Trade association for companies involved in the road safety markings industry

- Abbreviation: RSMA
- Formation: 1976 (as RMMCA)
- Type: Trade association
- Legal status: Unincorporated entity
- Purpose: Trade Association
- Location: Unit 35, Corringham Road Industrial Estate, Gainsborough, Lincolnshire, DN21 1QB
- Region served: UK
- Members: Companies involved in the road marking industry
- Chief Executive: Stu McInroy
- Website: RSMA

The Road Safety Markings Association (RSMA) is a trade association for companies involved in the road safety markings industry.

== History ==
The RSMA was founded in 1976, as the Road Marking Manufacturers and Contractors Association (RMMCA), changing its name to the Road Safety Markings Association in 1992. Initially based in Charlwood, Surrey, it had offices in Bury, Greater Manchester from 1998 to 2006, prior to setting up offices and a national training centre in Gainsborough, Lincolnshire.

== Function ==
As a trade association RSMA represents and promotes the legitimate business interests of the UK road marking sector (it has provided evidence to the House of Commons Transport Select Committee, for example). It also provides specialist services to member organisations, and undertakes research and marketing activities to identify the safety and economic benefits of road markings use - many of which are made from thermoplastics. For example, in 2014, an RSMA survey found that 52% of markings on motorways, 42% on dual carriageways, and 48% on single carriageways, all needed replacing immediately or imminently.

The RSMA publishes specialist trade publications including Top Marks (circulated to over 8000 industry specialists), and member publication (and e-publication) On the Line.

It offers industry training to companies and local authorities via its NHA subsidiary, established in 2007. As part of this, it runs the Specialist Applied-Skills Programme (SAP).

== Structure ==
The RSMA has representative committees specialising in health and safety, and technical issues.

=== Membership ===
RSMA has 65 members throughout the UK and Europe.

== See also ==
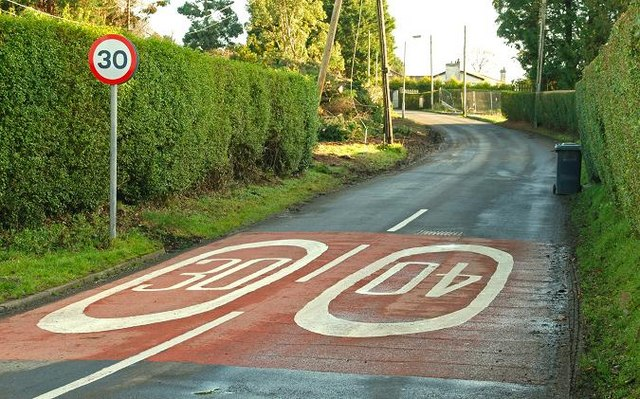
Typical road safety markings in Dromore, County Down

- Road signs in the United Kingdom
- Highways Agency
- Road Safety Foundation
- Highway Code (first published in 1934)
- Institute of Highway Engineers
- Living Streets (UK)
