= Market Rasen =

Town and civil parish in Lincolnshire, England

Coordinates: 53.38713°N 0.33550°W

- Market town and civil parish
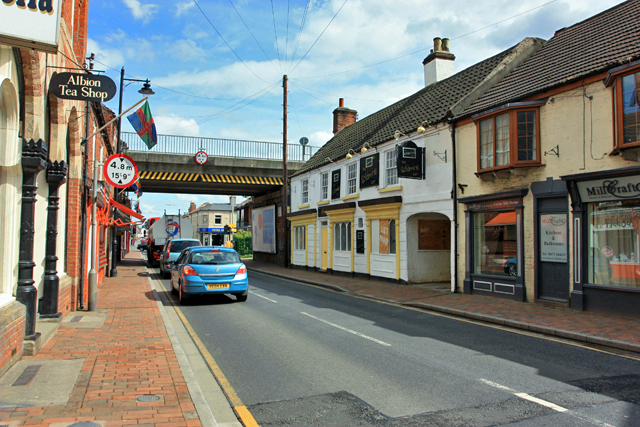
- Queen Street, 2009

- Location within Lincolnshire
- Interactive map showing the parish boundary
- Population: 4,087 (2021 census)
- OS grid reference: TF108891
  - London: 130 mi (210 km) S
- District: West Lindsey
- Shire county: Lincolnshire
- Region: East Midlands
- Country: England
- Sovereign state: United Kingdom
- Post town: Market Rasen
- Postcode district: LN8
- Dialling code: 01673
- Police: Lincolnshire
- Fire: Lincolnshire
- Ambulance: East Midlands
- UK Parliament: Gainsborough

Market Rasen (/ˈreɪzən/ RAY-zən) is a market town and civil parish within the West Lindsey district of Lincolnshire, England. It lies on the River Rase approximately 16 miles (26 km) north-east from Lincoln on the A46 road between Lincoln and Grimsby. It is famous for Market Rasen Racecourse. The parish had a population of 4,087 at the 2021 census.

== History ==
The place-name Market Rasen is first attested in the Domesday Book of 1086, where it appears as Rase, Rasa, and Resne. The name derives from the Old English ræsn meaning 'plank', and is thought to refer to a plank bridge. The river name Rase is a back-formation.

Originally, Rasen, as it is known locally, was called East Rasen, Rasen Parva or Little Rasen.

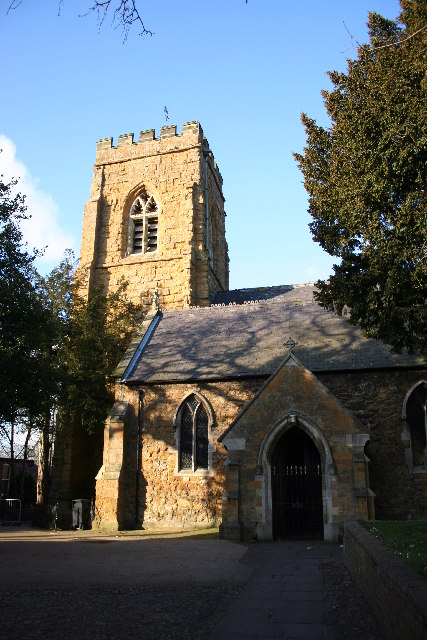
St Thomas's church

In the 19th century, touring theatrical companies performed in theatres in the town. David Grose opened 'a very neat and comfortable theatre' in 1834. In May 1844, the Giffords performed in the town.

The Corn Exchange was designed by Henry Goddard and completed in 1854.

Market Rasen's community fire and police station opened in December 2005. Market Rasen is served by a railway station which opened in 1848.

=== 1964 Vickers Valiant crash ===
Vickers Valiant 'WZ363' crashed on Wednesday 6 May 1964 at 11:41 p.m. It had flown from RAF Marham, having taken off at 7 p.m. It crashed near the B1202, around 400 yards south of the railway station, on the southern edge of the town, close to the fire station. There was a square mile of debris. People had seen an aircraft engine on fire.

The roof of the town's Methodist chapel was alight, which took a half hour to extinguish. Showers of sparks landed on the Wold View Estate, built in 1953, on the south-west of the town, as the aircraft flew over at roof-top height.

Search parties went out to look, but it was raining too much. Fire engines attended from Rasen and Wragby, with the Deputy Chief Fire Officer for Lindsey in attendance. There was a 25ft deep crater. Around 100 people from the town visited the scene that night, out of curiosity.

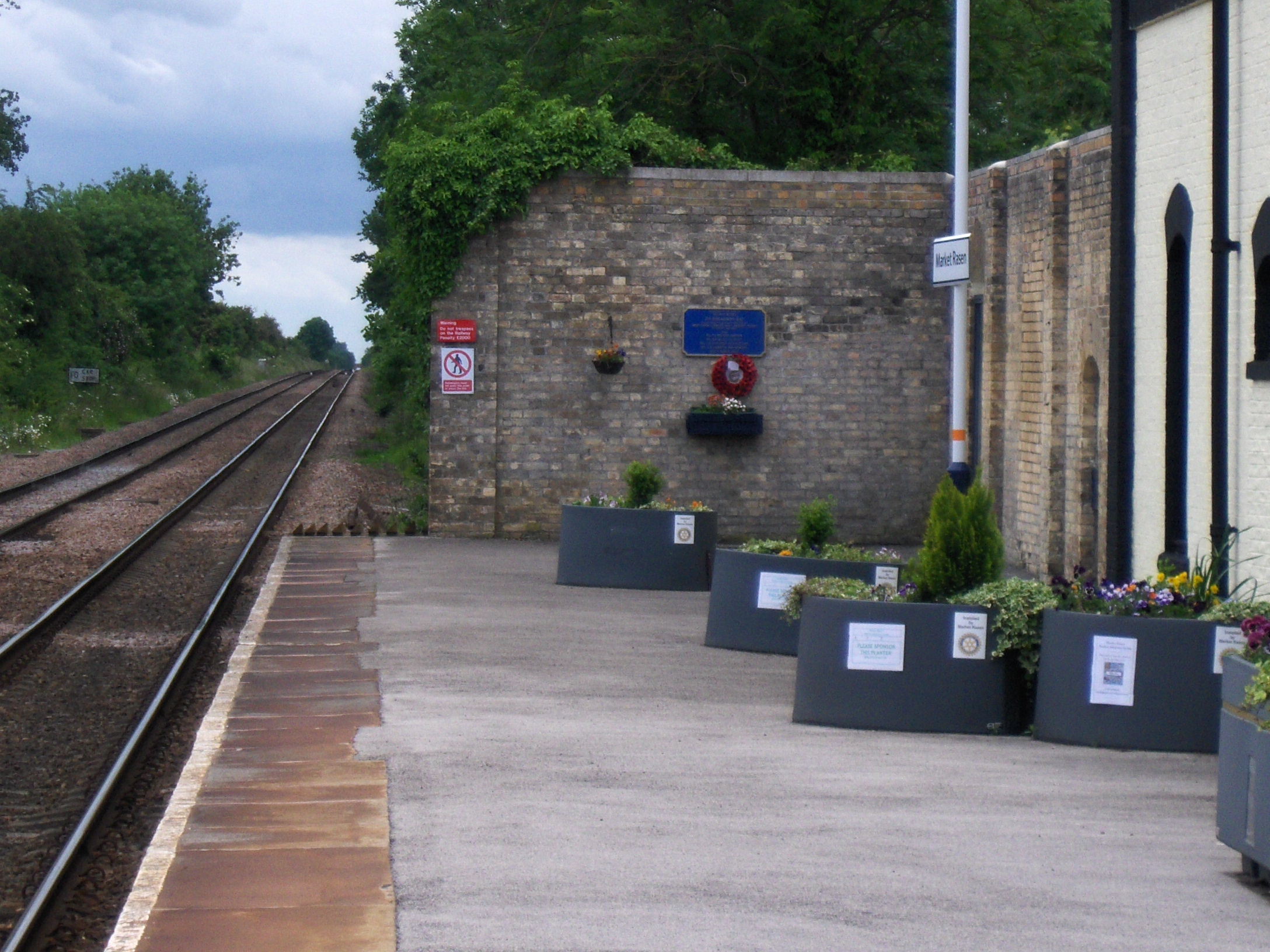
There is a May 2010 memorial on the northbound platform of the railway station

- Pilot - Flt Lt Francis Christopher Welles (10 May 1937 - May 1964), 26, from Ferring Close in Ferring, West Sussex; the son of Francis Channing Welles, he attended Dean Close School from 1950-55 in Cheltenham, and played hockey for Scotland in April 1962 against England for the Combined Services Hockey XI in 1962, and for the RAF, against the Switzerland national team, when a Pilot Officer at RAF Hack Green in 1956 and for the England Schools XI in 1955 and for Hampstead and for Gloucestershire in 1958
- Co-pilot - Flt Lt George Arthur Mills, married with two children, from Orford, Cheshire, attended Beamont Secondary School
- Navigator - Flt Lt John Robert Stringer, 37, married, from Letchworth, Hertfordshire
- Radio - Flt Lt Leslie Richard Hawkins, 30, of North Wembley
- Air Electronics Officer - Sgt Richard Noble, 25, had married two months previously, from Kings Lynn but lived at Narborough, Norfolk

=== February 2008 earthquake ===
On 27 February 2008, a significant earthquake had its epicentre approximately 2.5 miles (4.0 km) north-west of Market Rasen, near the neighbouring parish of Middle Rasen. The earthquake, which according to the British Geological Survey measured 5.2 on the Richter Scale, struck at a depth of 11.6 miles (18.7 km) and was felt across much of the UK from Edinburgh to Plymouth, and as far away as Bangor in Northern Ireland and Haarlem in the Netherlands. The 10-second quake was the largest recorded example in the United Kingdom since the 1984 Llŷn Peninsula earthquake struck North Wales, measuring 5.4. There were no recorded local injuries and only one recorded injury elsewhere in the UK, in South Yorkshire, when a chimney was dislodged from a house roof, falling down through the house's roof and landing on the male resident, who was in bed at the time, causing a broken pelvis.

== Geography ==
The River Rase flows through the town from east to west and is crossed by Waterloo Street at Crane Bridge.

In 2011, it was one of the towns chosen for the Portas Review of small-town retailing businesses.

== Demographics ==
At the 2021 census, the civil parish had a population of 4,087 people in 2,023 households.

Census population of Market Rasen parish
Census	Population	Female	Male	Households	Source
2001	3,230	1,678	1,552	1,422	
2011	3,904	1,982	1,922	1,788	
2021	4,087	2,098	1,989	2,023	

== Education ==
Market Rasen's secondary school is De Aston School, a co-educational 11–18 former comprehensive school now an academy member with approximately 1,300 pupils, including day pupils and formerly boarders. It was founded in 1863 as a small grammar school as part of a legal settlement following a court case involving funds from the medieval charity of Thomas de Aston, a 13th-century monk.

The main primary school is the Market Rasen Church of England Primary School.

== Media ==
Local news and television programmes are provided by BBC Yorkshire and Lincolnshire and ITV Yorkshire. Television signals are received from the nearby Belmont TV transmitter.

The town newspaper is the weekly Market Rasen Mail, which was founded in 1856.

Local radio stations are BBC Radio Lincolnshire on 94.9 FM, Greatest Hits Radio Lincolnshire on 102.2 FM, DAB radio station, Hits Radio Lincolnshire and County Linx Radio, a community online station.

== People ==
- The evangelist Ann Carr was born here in 1783
- Bernie Taupin, lyricist and long-term collaborator with Elton John, spent his teenage years here
- Philip Oakes, journalist, author and poet died here in 2005
- Rod Temperton, hit songwriter for Michael Jackson was at school here
- Philippa Lowthorpe, television director was at school here
- Gordon White, co-founder of Hanson plc grew up here
- Simon Marsden, photographer & baronet lived in the Lincolnshire Wolds nearby
- Roger Scruton, philosopher born in nearby Buslingthorpe
- Harriet Bibby, actress best known for appearing in Coronation Street was born here

== See also ==
- Market Rasen railway station
- Great Grimsby and Sheffield Junction Railway
- Holy Rood Church, Market Rasen
