= List of historic sites in Lincolnshire =

This is a list of all of the notable historic sites in the ceremonial county of Lincolnshire, England.

This list is incomplete. Please feel free to expand it.

== Stone Age (Neolithic) ==
Name	Description	Location	Date	Conservation Status	Notes
Ash Hill	Long barrow	Swinhope		Scheduled Ancient Monument	
Ash Holt	Long barrow	Swallow		Scheduled Ancient Monument	
Beacon Plantation	Long barrow	Walmsgate		Scheduled Ancient Monument	
Burgh on Bain	Long barrow	Burgh on Bain		Scheduled Ancient Monument	
Deadmen's Graves	Long Barrows	Claxby St Andrew		Scheduled Ancient Monument	
Giant's Hills	Long Barrows	Skendleby		Scheduled Ancient Monument	
Hills Brough	Long barrow	Normanby le Wold		Scheduled Ancient Monument	
Cromwell's Grave	Long Barrows	Hoe Hill, Swinhope		Scheduled Ancient Monument	
Shearman's Wath	Henge	West Ashby		Scheduled Ancient Monument	
Spellow Hills	Long barrow	Langton by Spilsby		Scheduled Ancient Monument	AKA; Hills of the Slain
Tathwell	Long barrow	Tathwell		Scheduled Ancient Monument	
Thorganby	Long barrow	Thorganby, Lincolnshire		Scheduled Ancient Monument	

== Bronze Age ==
Name	Description	Location	Date	Conservation Status	Notes
Beacon Hill	Round barrow	Cleethorpes		Scheduled Ancient Monument	
Bully Hill	Round barrow	Kirmond le Mire		Scheduled Ancient Monument	
Bully Hills	Round Barrows	Tathwell		Scheduled Ancient Monument	
Biscathorpe	Round Barrows	Biscathorpe		Scheduled Ancient Monument	
Burwell Wood	Round Barrows	Burwell		Scheduled Ancient Monument	
Buslingthorpe	Round barrow	Buslingthorpe		Scheduled Ancient Monument	
Butterbumps	Round Barrows	Willoughby		Scheduled Ancient Monument	
Cleatham	Round barrow	Manton		Scheduled Ancient Monument	
Donington on Bain	Round barrow	Donington on Bain		Scheduled Ancient Monument	
Folk Moot	Round barrow	Silk Willoughby		Scheduled Ancient Monument	
Butt Mound	Round barrow	Silk Willoughby		Scheduled Ancient Monument	
Fordington	Round Barrows	Fordington		Scheduled Ancient Monument	
Grim's Mound	Round barrow	Grimblethorpe		Scheduled Ancient Monument	
Hagworthingham	Round barrow	Hagworthingham		Scheduled Ancient Monument	
Hatcliffe	Round barrow	Hatcliffe		Scheduled Ancient Monument	
Howe Hill	Round barrow	Wootton		Scheduled Ancient Monument	
King's Hill	Round barrow	Bardney		Scheduled Ancient Monument	Possibly medieval
Ludford	Round barrow	Ludford		Scheduled Ancient Monument	
Mill Hill	Round barrow	Claxby St Andrew		Scheduled Ancient Monument	
Revesby	Round Barrows	Revesby, Lincolnshire		Scheduled Ancient Monument	
Ring Holt	Round barrow	Langton by Spilsby		Scheduled Ancient Monument	

== Later Middle Ages - 1066 to 1485 ==
Name	Description	Location	Date	Conservation Status	Notes
Barrow upon Humber Castle	Castle	Barrow upon Humber	C11		
Bolingbroke Castle	Castle	Bolingbroke	C13-C14		
Bourne Castle	Castle	Bourne	C11		
Bytham Castle	Castle	Castle Bytham	C11		
Carlton Castle	Castle	Reston	C12		
Folkingham Castle	Castle	Folkingham	C12-C14		
Goltho Castle	Castle	Goltho	C11		On earlier Saxon site
Grimsthorpe Castle	Castle/Stately Home	Grimsthorpe	C13		
Heydour Castle	Castle	Heydour	C12		
High Bridge, Lincoln	Medieval Bridge with Building	Lincoln	Bridge c.1160, building c.1550		
Hussey Tower	Castle	Boston	C14-C15		
Kingerby Castle	Castle	Kingerby			
Kyme Tower	Castle	South Kyme	C14		
Lincoln Castle	Castle	Lincoln	C11-C13		
Lincoln Cathedral	Cathedral	Lincoln	Built 1185–1311		
Owston Ferry Castle	Castle	Owston Ferry	C11-C12		
Rochford Tower	Castle	Boston	C15-C16		
Sleaford Castle	Castle	Sleaford	C12		
Somerton Castle	Castle	Boothby Graffoe	1281–1305		
Stamford Castle	Castle	Stamford	C11		
Tattershall Castle	Castle	Tattershall	Originally 1231, current structure 1430		
Toot Hill	Castle	Tothill			
Welbourn Castle	Castle	Welbourn			
Withern Castle	Castle	Withern			

== See also ==
- Lincolnshire
- History of Lincolnshire
  - Kingdom of Lindsey
  - Lindum Colonia
- List of castles in England
