= History of Lincolnshire =

The history of Lincolnshire spans from early Corieltauvi settlement and Roman urbanisation at Lindum Colonia to mediaeval agricultural wealth and 20th-century industry and aviation. Modern Lincolnshire is derived from the merging of the territory of the ancient Kingdom of Lindsey with that controlled by the Danelaw borough of Stamford. For some time the entire county was called 'Lindsey', and it is recorded as such in the Domesday Book. Later, Lindsey was applied to only the northern core, around Lincoln; it was defined as one of the three 'Parts of Lincolnshire', along with Holland in the southeast and Kesteven in the southwest.

During the High Middle Ages, Lincolnshire prospered through the wool trade, generating vast wealth that funded iconic wool churches and made Boston a principal English port. Early modern turbulence followed, including the 1536 Lincolnshire Rising against the Dissolution of the Monasteries and heavy skirmishing during the First English Civil War. The 18th and 19th centuries brought massive agricultural transformation through the systematic land drainage of the Fens, while the first and second world wars established the county as a primary hub for RAF Bomber Command, earning it the moniker "Bomber County".

When county councils were set up in 1888, Lindsey, Holland, and Kesteven were each authorised to have separate "Part" councils. These survived until 1974, when Holland, Kesteven, and most of Lindsey were merged into Lincolnshire, with the northern part, including Scunthorpe and Grimsby, joining the newly formed non-metropolitan county of Humberside alongside most of the East Riding of Yorkshire.

An additional local government reform in 1996 abolished Humberside, and the areas south of the Humber became the unitary authorities of North Lincolnshire and North East Lincolnshire. These areas rejoined Lincolnshire for ceremonial purposes, such as the Lord-Lieutenancy, though they retain separate policing arrangements under Humberside Police. These two authorities sit within the Yorkshire and the Humber region.

The remaining non-metropolitan districts of Lincolnshire are Boston, East Lindsey, Lincoln, South Holland, South Kesteven, North Kesteven, and West Lindsey, which are part of the East Midlands region.

== Stone Age ==
During the Pleistocene epoch, Britain's climate alternated between long periods of extreme cold and relative warmth; at least the last three cold spells lead to glaciation, during which ice moved southwards across England. Lincolnshire was covered by ice in the Anglian and Wolstonian glacial stages and the eastern parts of the county were glaciated during the Devensian. Palaeolithic hunter-gatherers migrated to Britain at least 800,000 years ago, but evidence of early settlement in the Midlands is sparse, probably due to the ice disrupting remains. (Note: The earliest evidence of hominin inhabitants are the Happisburgh footprints in Norfolk, dated to earlier than 800,000 years ago.) Flint flakes at Kirmington in Lincolnshire have been traced to the Hoxnian interglacial, which fell between the Anglian and Wolstonian stages. Most of the other lower Palaeolithic finds in Lincolnshire are Acheulian hand-axes, which date from that period onwards.

During the Ipswichian warm period after the Wolstonian, humans began fashioning Mousterian flint-axes, a specimen of which has been found at Risby Warren, near Scunthorpe in northern Lincolnshire. Finds from the late Devensian have also been uncovered at Scunthorpe and dated to between 12,000 and 8,000 BC. As the Ice age subsided, Britain's climate shifted from sub-Arctic to temperate. Humans developed more complex and innovative stone tools in the Mesolithic era, although their economy remained chiefly hunter-gatherer. The Scunthorpe area may have been a "focus of population" during the Mesolithic. A camp at Willoughton has been excavated, revealing hearths and flints; digging at Sheffield's Hill has revealed microliths, indicating a later settlement date, possibly to the 6th millennium BC, while those found at Risby Warren are even more sophisticated and numerous. Mesolithic sites have also been uncovered along the southern edge of the Lincolnshire Wolds and between Ancaster and Grantham.

The Neolithic is the last stage of Stone Age culture, defined by the use of polished stone tools, a dependence on domesticated plants and animals and the development of pottery and other crafts. Few early Neolithic settlements have been identified in Lincolnshire; examples include a hollow at Dragonby, pottery and flint at Great Ponton, and pottery found in a later barrow at Walesby. Long barrows have been discovered in the southern and central Wolds and include the Giants' Hills barrows at Skendleby. Surface artefacts, mostly late Neolithic flint or other stone tools, are found scattered across the county and especially in the lower Trent Valley and the Lincoln Vale.

== Bronze Age ==
Beaker pottery emerged during the late Neolithic and survived into the Bronze Age, which heralded the use of Bronze tools instead of stone. Early beaker remains from around Scunthorpe and in the southern Wolds have been dated to the third millennium BC. Excavations at Risby Warren have revealed a large amount of Bronze Age beaker pottery from the early 2nd millennium BC, while similar material has been identified around Scunthorpe, the southern Wolds and Ancaster. Although Lincolnshire was once noted for its prehistoric burial mounds, modern farming has destroyed many of them; surviving beaker barrows include the Bronze Age sites at Tallington, Thoresway, Broughton, Cleethorpes, Willoughby and Stroxton, along with scattered tumuli in the Wolds. Middle to late Bronze Age discoveries include a hoard of swords and spearheads from Appleby, a gold torc from Low Burnham (in the British Museum), and a now lost gold "armlet" from Cuxwold.

Changes in vegetation occurred across Britain between roughly 1300 and 600 BC; in Lincolnshire, drier conditions caused pine trees to grow around the Fen edge, while oak forests were largely replaced with peat bogs or moorland. As a result, older settlements were abandoned and new ones began to emerge, leading to difficulties in identifying Bronze Age settlement and burial sites in the county. However, late Bronze Age hoards are known and one of them, from Nettleham, is in the British Museum; the hoard of bronzes from Bagmoor Farm, near Scunthorpe, indicates a continental influence on craftsmanship and it is likely that an antennae-pommelled sword from the River Witham was imported from Europe. A wooden trackway from this era has been found at Brigg in north Lincolnshire, nearby to where a wooden boat has been uncovered and tentatively dated to the mid-1st millennium BC. Dug-out canoes have also been uncovered from the Welland, Nene, Trent and Ancholme valleys and the river Witham.

== Iron Age ==
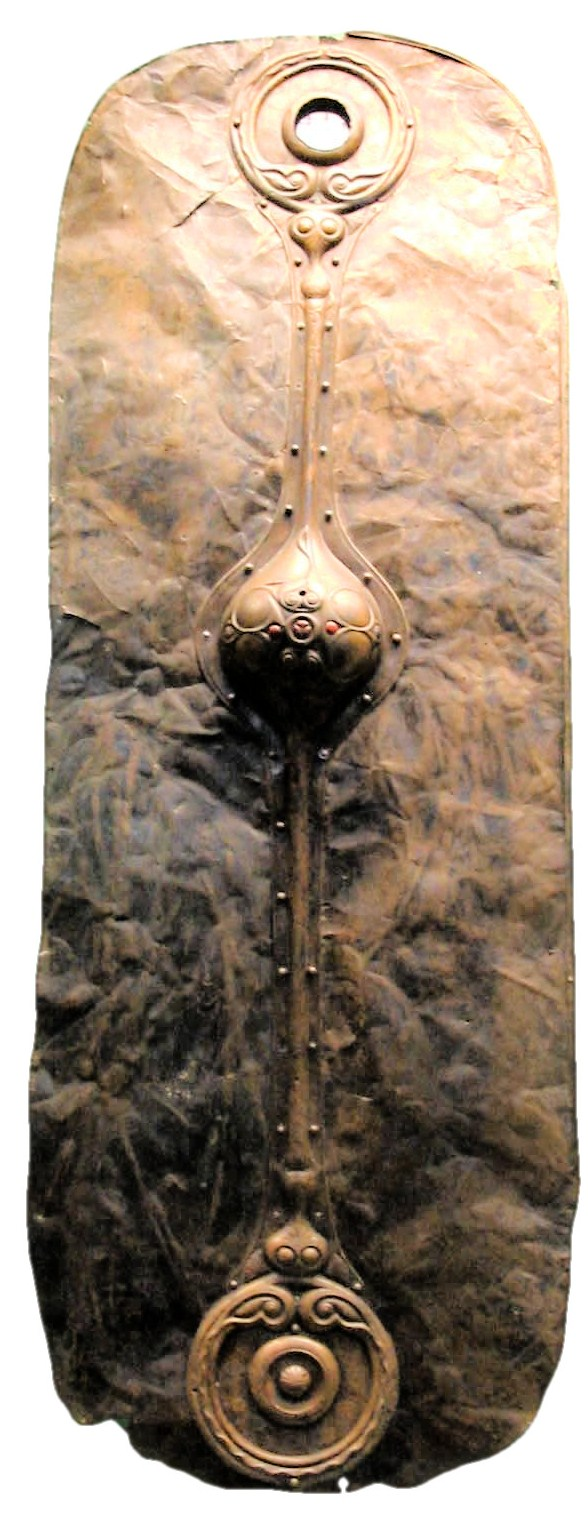
The Witham Shield, c. 300–400 BC: "the finest example of Early La Tène Celtic Art from Britain".

As iron replaced bronze in tool-making in the Iron Age, the distinctive La Tène culture emerged in Celtic societies around 500 BC. Little material from the early stages of La Tène has been uncovered in Lincolnshire. Examples include a bronze brooch from Scunthorpe and a bronze scabbard or sheath with remains of an iron sword found in Wisbech, one of the earliest pieces of decorated La Tène metalwork in the British Isles. A now lost anthropoid-hilted iron dagger in a Bronze sheath with an imp-like pommel probably dated from the 2nd or 1st centuries BC, but the beaten bronze shield dredged from the River Witham remains amongst the "finest and largest surviving La Tène art in Europe". An early Iron Age farming settlement at Ancaster and salterns at Ingoldmells have been excavated; forts from this period are also known: Honington Camp, Round Hills at Ingoldsby, Careby Camp, and Yarborough Camp. Despite the comparatively small number and size of forts in Lincolnshire, the archaeologist Jeffrey May suggests that the landscape's suitability for farming and its prominent salt industry may have led to prosperity during the Iron Age.

The more decorative late Iron Age finds include gold torcs from Ulceby, bronze terrets from Owmby and Whaplode, a bronze ornament from Dragonby, a strap link from Caythorpe and a sword and scabbard from the River Witham. Parts of a war horn were also found in the Witham, but were melted down in the 18th century. There was an "extensive" Iron Age settlement at Old Sleaford, where over 3,500 fragments of coin moulds have been discovered, the largest such find in Europe; it may have been a tribal centre, but never became a walled town under Roman rule. The Ancaster-Sleaford region has a high concentration of settlement, which may be due to geographical factors and the presence of two north–south communication lines, Mareham Lane and Jurassic Way. Similarly, the northern Wolds were more densely inhabited; settlements at Kirmington and Dragonby have been excavated, while North Ferriby was a crossing on the Humber connected to the south by High Street. The earliest coinage in Lincolnshire were gold copies of Gallo-Belgic types, but the distinctive South Ferriby type emerged as the dominant pattern in East Midlands and silver coins became much more common from the 2nd century BC.

The pre-Roman East Midlands were occupied by the Corieltauvi tribe. In his Geography, Ptolemy of Alexandria described Lindum (modern Lincoln) and Ratae (modern Leicester) as the principal towns of the tribe. Whether other groups operated in the county is not clear and it may be that the Catuvellauni controlled parts of southern Lincolnshire. The Roman arrival in AD 43 brought the Ninth Legion to the East Midlands to subjugate the native peoples; they may have reached the county by AD 45.

== Roman ==
The Romans established permanent government in Lincolnshire soon after their invasion of AD 43. The tyrannical rule of the Roman sub-prætor Ostorius Scapula so inflamed the Corieltauvi and their neighbours in Yorkshire, the Brigantes, that the two peoples conducted a simmering, low-key rebellion lasting well into AD 70.

Eventually, the Governorship of Britain was given to the Deputy of the Prefect of Gaul, and the title Vicar of Britain created. He resided at York. The sub-district of Flavia Caesariensis, which comprised Lincolnshire and parts of the Midlands, was created.

Once established, the Romans worked to develop infrastructure in Lincolnshire. They built the Car Dyke, a series of semi-natural and artificial boundary ditches which run from the River Welland at Market Deeping for 64 km to the River Witham at Washingborough, constructed hard standings and walkways across the Fens, and also built inland ports, such as the Brayford Pool at Lincoln.

The main Roman forts in Lincolnshire were:

- Ancaster
- Brant Broughton (Briga)
- Caistor
- Broughton (Praetorium)
- Horncastle (Banovalum)
- Kirton in Lindsey (Inmedio)
- Lincoln (Lindum Colonia)
- Louth (Luda)
- Ludford
- Stow (Sidnacester)
- Tattershall (Drurobrivis)
- Torksey (Tiovulfingacester)
- Wainfleet (Vainona)
- Willoughby (Verometum)
- Winteringham (Ad Abum)

The Romans built three main roads through Lincolnshire:

- Ermine Street (London to York via Stamford, Lincoln and Winteringham)
- Fosse Way (Lincoln to Exeter)
- Tillbridge Lane (Lincoln to York via Marton and Littleborough)

Other roads of Roman origin are the Salters' Way, continuing the line from the Leicestershire border across Ermine Street near Old Somerby, to what was then coast at Donington. King Street, including The Long Hollow road, joined Ancaster to the fen edge and Durobrivae near Peterborough. Two roads linked Lincoln to the coast across the Wolds. This was used as part of the defence system set up to protect the Saxon Shore and re-used by William the Conqueror in conjunction with Lincoln Castle.

Scores of smaller sections of roads branch off from the three major routes and are certainly Roman as well. They link Ermine Street with the Wolds, and King Street with the coast. Also, Mareham Lane continued the fen-edge line of King Street northwards.

During the Roman period, north Lincolnshire produced the regional, coarseware ceramic Dales ware.

== Early Middle Ages ==
Large numbers of people from Germanic-speaking areas of continental Europe settled in the area starting in the fifth century. Eventually, these became known as Angles, though they most likely did not migrate as part of a coherent tribal group. However, indications of a continuing presence of Britons in the region (such as place names) are stronger than in nearby East Anglia, and the transition from British to Anglo-Saxon control may have been peaceful. It has been suggested that Brittonic was spoken in some communities into the eighth century.

The Kingdom of Lindsey was established between the Witham River and the Humber, in the northern part of what is now Lincolnshire, by the 6th century. It appeared to have maintained its independence until at least the end of the 7th century, but was absorbed by Mercia – a rising power – in the 8th century.

In 865 a formidable Danish raiding army, led by Ivar (spelled "Hinguar" or "Igwar" in English sources), one of the sons of Ragnar Lothbrok, landed in East Anglia and established winter quarters there. Within a few years, this force succeeded in conquering Mercia and all the other Anglo-Saxon kingdoms except Wessex.

Scandinavian settlers followed the raiders into the swathe of England under Danish control, which became known as the Danelaw. They have left a legacy of Scandinavian elements in many Lincolnshire place-names. Lincoln became a Danish borough. In the 10th century, it was designated as the head of the new shire of Lincolnshire.

== Later Middle Ages ==
The Anglo-Saxon nobility of Lincolnshire was destroyed by the Norman William the Conqueror, and the lands were divided amongst his followers. He constructed Lincoln Castle and another at Tattershall. Numerous others were built by Norman magnates, the first ones mainly in the years immediately following the Conquest. Another group of castles were built around 1140, during the period of civil war when Stephen and Matilda were disputing the right to rule. The First Battle of Lincoln, in 1141, was part of this conflict.

The Witham valley between Boston and Lincoln was developed with the highest concentration of Christian abbeys and monastic foundations in England. The principal foundations were Barlings Abbey, Bardney Abbey, Catley Abbey, Nocton Priory, Stainfield Abbey, Stixwould Abbey, Tupholme Abbey, Kirkstead Abbey, Kyme Abbey. There were also monastic houses at Bourne Abbey, Sempringhm Abbey and many other places. But the clustering along the Witham was extraordinary.

Fewer castles were built, although some of the manors were fortified in early years. Given the size of Lincolnshire, historians note the relative lack of castles, just as they do the plethora of abbeys along the Witham. Boston had seven friaries but it was defended only by the town walls. There appears to have been no garrison.

Fairs at Stamford, Grantham, and Stow Fair were established, and lasted throughout the period. Corby Glen sheep fair has been held more or less unchanged annually since 1238.

Sheep farming and the wool trade brought untold wealth to the area, and Boston was a major trading centre for wool. The wool trade and associated trades supported the construction of highly elaborate churches in the region. St. Botolph's Church in Boston has a tall tower spire that can be seen from miles around across land and sea.

In this period the Queen's Champion was appointed, and the post is still held by his successor. Many great estates and schools were founded. The Middle Ages were as rich and colourful in Lincolnshire as anywhere else. But there were conflicts, such as accusations against the Jews and the Lincolnshire rebellion, in which lower classes struggled with constraints, show that life was not all a sybaritic idyll.

An important medieval book, the Luttrell Psalter, was the source for nearly every schoolbook illustrations of the period. It lay unregarded in the church at Irnham until the early 20th century, when it was discovered and preserved for the nation. A public subscription in a popular newspaper raised enough money to buy the book before it was sold overseas.

Grantham's St Wulfram's Church has a fine example of a chained library still extant within the church. Numerous churches were established in Lincolnshire that are dedicated to women saints; their names have been given to daughters of county families and passed down in a tradition continuing long after the Protestant Reformation.

== Early Modern ==
During the Protestant reformation, Lincolnshire had strong pro-Catholic sentiments, and on 2 October 1536 an anti Anglican peasant rebellion broke out. The leaders of this rebellion were local peasants and Catholic priests. King Henry VIII responded by dispatching an army of 3,000 soldiers under the command of Sir John Russell and the duke of Suffolk to quell the rebellion. Despite the large number of the rebels (around 60,000), the rebellion was suppressed on 13 October. During the English Civil War, Lincolnshire was part of the Eastern Association, the Parliamentarian alliance. On its western border lay the Royalist strongholds, of Newark on Trent and Belvoir Castle. Lincolnshire was therefore raided and defended by the respective parties. For a time, Crowland, in the south of the county was fortified for the king.

Lincolnshire was important to the Parliamentarians as it provided access between the great arsenal of Hull and the south and the Eastern Association's heartland in the east of England. It also offered a potential starting line for an advance across the English Midlands, cutting the north of England off from the west.

== Victorian ==
In June 1888, Mr G Randall visited 'some 30 villages' across Lincolnshire, recruiting people who were prepared to move to Queensland, including Bicker, Heckington Fen, Ropsley, Dunston, Minting, Donington-on-Bain, East Barkwith, Binbrook, Claxby, Waddingham, Normanby-by-Spital, Welton, Scampton, Eagle, Caythorpe. He claimed 7000 had already left, recruiting a further 200 who sailed on the SS Waroonga, which landed passengers at Cooktown, Townsville, Cairns, Mackay, Rockhampton, and Brisbane.

== Second World War ==
=== The RAF in the Second World War ===
In the late 1930s, despite its coastal holiday industry, distant and near water fishing industries, iron mining and smelting, heavy machinery manufacturing, the country's main road and railway lines and growing number of airfields, Lincolnshire was large enough to give an impression of being a largely unvisited, peaceful agricultural backwater until the Second World War, when its extent, gentle topography and relative proximity to the enemy led to a further expansion in the number of Royal Air Force stations in the county. By 1945 the number of RAF bases exceeded 46. Some of these had by that stage been lent to the Eighth United States Army Air Force. The first airfields had been built for the Royal Flying Corps (RFC) or the Royal Naval Air Service, the first of them at Skegness, on the coast, in 1912, when the RFC was established. Among the more famous Royal Air Force stations in the county was and is RAF Cranwell. This had begun as The Royal Naval Air Service Central Training Establishment, Cranwell; commonly known as HMS Daedalus, commissioned 1 April 1916. It became the RAF Officer Training College after the formation of the RAF in April 1918. RAF Swinderby was a Polish-manned RAF station and from 1964, the RAF's main Recruit Training Camp. RAF Scampton, was the home base of 617 Squadron.

Lincolnshire still has the strongest claim to being the 'home' of RAF Bomber Command, playing host to many squadrons, including the Lancaster bombers of the famous 617 Dambusters squadron who were based at RAF Scampton. There were two Bomber Groups based in the county – No. 1 in the north and No. 5 Group in the centre and south. The Battle of Britain memorial flight is still led by a Lancaster named The City of Lincoln.

Before the war, Sir Frank Whittle had attended RAF Cranwell, near Sleaford, in the late 1920s. Here he formulated his ideas for the jet engine. On 15 May 1941 the world's first true jet-engine flight took place at Cranwell, by the Gloster E.28/39.

Most of the airfields were closed after the war and, although most have been built over, disused airfields, abandoned control towers and crumbling concrete bunkers and airfield buildings remain a physical feature of the county in a number of places, and many still, it is said, holding ghosts and are haunted. Many people in Lincolnshire have learned to drive a car on the disused concrete airstrips of the county.

== Cold War history ==
RAF Waddington and RAF Scampton formed two of the main bases for the V bomber Force, flying Vulcans, during the Cold War, while Thor missiles were stationed on former wartime air stations at for example, RAF Folkingham.

== See also ==
- List of historic sites in Lincolnshire
- List of churches in Lincolnshire
- List of Roman Sites in Lincolnshire
- History of England
