= Historiography of the Anglo-Saxon settlement of Britain =

Area of study on cultural group origins

The historiography on the Anglo-Saxon migration into Britain has tried to explain how there was a widespread change from Romano-British to Anglo-Saxon cultures in the area roughly corresponding to present-day England between the Fall of the Western Roman Empire and the eighth century, a time when there were scant historical records.

From as early as the eighth century until around the 1970s, the traditional view of the settlement was a mass invasion in which "Anglo-Saxon" incomers exterminated or enslaved many of the native "Romano-British" inhabitants of Britain, driving the remainder from eastern Britain into western Britain and Brittany. This view has influenced many of the scholarly and popular perceptions of the process of anglicisation in Britain. It remains the starting point and default position from which other hypotheses are compared in modern reviews of the evidence.

From the 1970s onwards there was a reaction to this narrative, drawing particularly on archaeology, contending that the initial migration had been of a very small group of elite warriors who offered a more attractive form of social organisation to the late Roman models available in Britain at the time.

Since around 2010, genetic studies have begun to contribute a new dataset, suggesting a greater migration from the Continent to Britain, and of Britons to the West, particularly in the case of Southern England and Eastern England, although not a total population replacement. There is as yet, however, little consensus about what this rapidly increasing body of data reveals.

Accounts of the transition from Roman to Anglo-Saxon culture in Britain have been influenced by the political contexts of the scholars who produced them, including many centuries of English colonialism within the British Isles, the Norman Conquest, the Reformation and British settlement in America. Twentieth-century academic disciplinary boundaries have led to divergent histories becoming accepted in different disciplines (for example between history, archaeology, and genetics) or in different sub-disciplines (for example between Roman and early medieval archaeology, or between archaeologists focusing on "Anglo-Saxon" and "Celtic" archaeology).

== Early medieval views ==
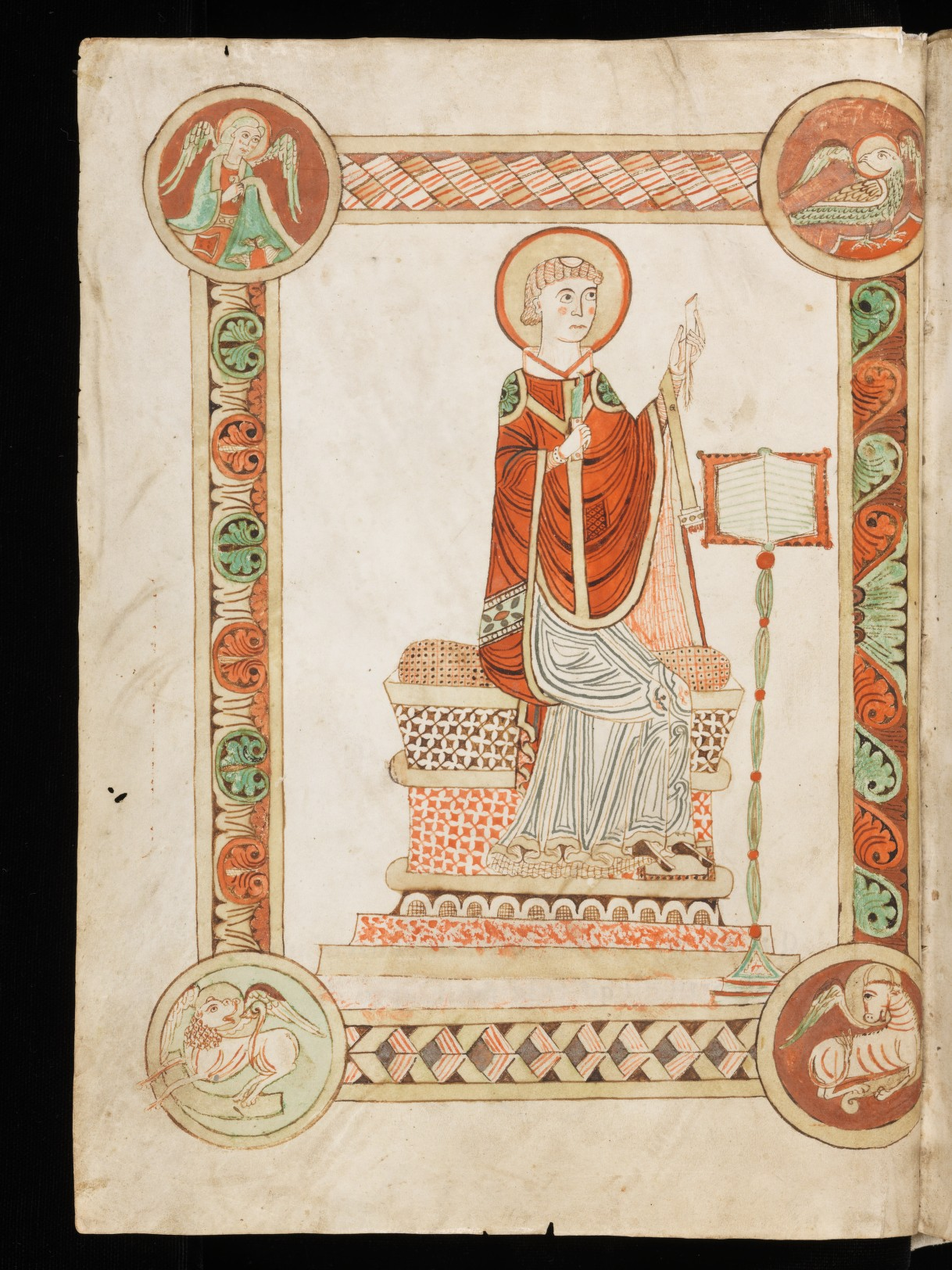
The Venerable Bede writing the Ecclesiastical History of the English People, from a codex at Engelberg Abbey, Switzerland.

Contemporary written sources record scarcely any account of the most influential phases of Anglo-Saxon migration to Britain, generally thought to have been around the fifth century. Surviving written accounts of events of that period are all at least decades after the facts, yet remained the basis for historians' understanding of Anglo-Saxon settlement from the eighth century into the 1970s, and remained influential on less scholarly history-writing into the 2020s.

=== Continental sources ===
Near-contemporary Continental sources attest to raids (though not necessarily settlement) of Britain by Saxons around the fifth century. The Vita Germani, a hagiography of Saint Germanus of Auxerre written in 480, claims that during a visit to Britain this Gaulish bishop helped command a British defence against an invasion of Picts and Saxons in 429.

According to the Chronica Gallica of 452, a chronicle written in Gaul, Britain was ravaged by Saxon invaders in 409 or 410. This was only a few years after Constantine III was declared Roman emperor in Britain, and during the period that he was still leading British Roman forces in rebellion on the Continent. Although the rebellion was eventually quashed, the Romano-British citizens reportedly expelled their Roman officials during this period, and never again re-joined the Roman empire. Writing in the mid-sixth century, Procopius states that after the overthrow of Constantine III in 411, "the Romans never succeeded in recovering Britain, but it remained from that time under tyrants" without, however, being clear as to the ethnicity of the "tyrants".

=== Gildas's De Excidio et Conquestu Britanniae ===
The earliest text to give an explicit account of settlement of Britain by what it calls "Saxons" (Latin Saxones) is the sermon De Excidio et Conquestu Britanniae. Its date of composition is uncertain, plausibly falling between the late fifth and the mid-sixth century. Inspired by Old Testament prophetical writing, seven eighths of the De excidio chastises political figures contemporary with Gildas for their irreligious behaviour. But the work opens with a short historical sketch of the sins of the Britons and their "ruin and conquest" by "Saxons", initially invited to the island as mercenaries, and although it makes up only an eighth of the text, it is this passage that has attracted most attention from historians, from the Early Middle Ages into the twenty-first century. In Gildas's account, settlement in Britain by Saxons was divine punishment for the sinful nature of many British rulers.

=== Anglo-Saxon sources ===
Gildas's account of "Saxon" settlement was adapted and supplemented by Bede in his Ecclesiastical History of the English People, a text that was politically committed to the idea that there was such a thing as English ethnicity, to give an account of settlement by the English (Latin Angli); that the whole of Britain should be a politically unitary part of the Roman Church; and that these agendas constituted the divine plan of the Christian God. Like Gildas, Bede presented the settlement as divinely motivated, echoing divine punishment for Jews' poor behaviour in the Old Testament:

to put it briefly, the fire kindled by the hands of the heathen executed the just vengeance of God on the nation for its crimes. It was not unlike that fire once kindled by the Chaldeans which consumed the walls and all the buildings of Jerusalem. So here in Britain the just Judge ordained that the fire of their brutal conquerors should ravage all the neighbouring cities and countryside from the east to the western sea, and burn on, with no one to hinder it, until it covered almost the whole face of the doomed island.

Unlike Gildas, however, Bede implied that the English were not only sent by God to punish the Britons, but to bring Britain under their own rule, and through their own conversion to Christianity into the Roman Church.

Bede also took the view that this was an invasion of three tribes — the Angles, the Saxons and the Jutes — at a specific date, 449 AD, yet this information is not presented in his History in an internally consistent way.

Regardless of how close it may have come to historical reality, Bede's account of the migration was hugely influential on later historical writing in Britain. It was a source for the Historia Brittonum, composed in ninth-century Wales. As well as being translated and adapted into Old English, it influenced, for example, the Anglo Saxon Chronicle's account of the fifth and sixth centuries.

== Later medieval views ==
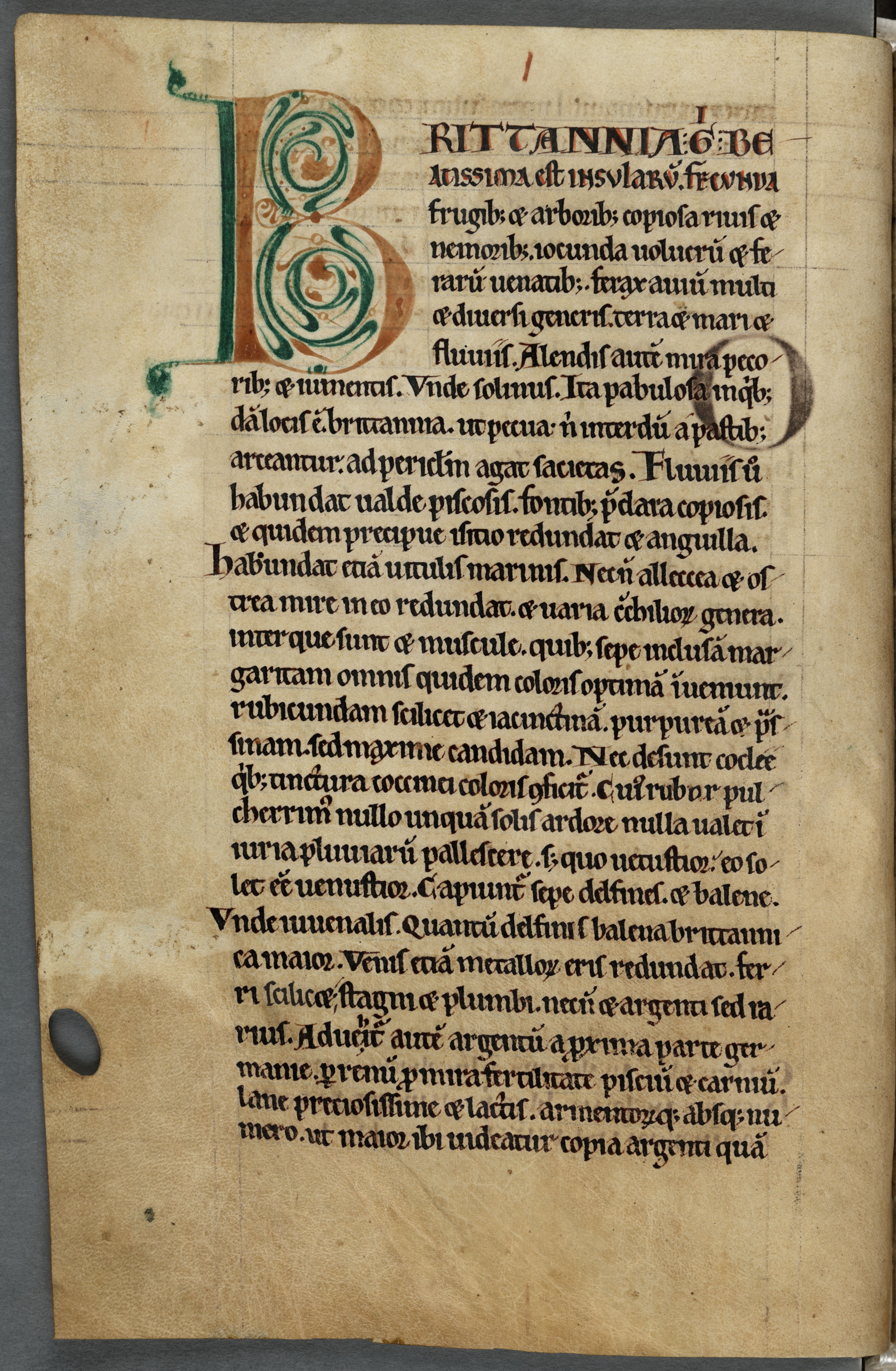
The opening page from Book 1 of the Historia Anglorum.

During the high-to-late medieval period, interpretations of the Anglo-Saxon settlement of Britain were shaped by a combination of monastic traditions, genealogical interests and political concerns — not least different power groups' desire to legitimate or adapt to the Norman Conquest of England of 1066. Chroniclers such as Henry of Huntingdon and Geoffrey of Monmouth relied on earlier sources, particularly Bede's Ecclesiastical History of the English People and the Anglo-Saxon Chronicle, adapting these accounts to reflect the concerns of their own times.

A dominant narrative among late medieval writers was the idea of the Anglo-Saxon migration as a violent invasion that led to the near-total displacement of the native Britons. This interpretation, rooted in Bede and so in Gildas, was frequently repeated and expanded upon in later medieval chronicles. Henry of Huntingdon, in his Historia Anglorum, presented the arrival of the Anglo-Saxons as an overwhelming catastrophe for the Britons, describing their defeat as divine punishment for their sins — he treated the Angle and Saxon "invasions" as two of five invasions (together with the Picts, Scots and Normans) that were sent as a punishment from God.

Geoffrey of Monmouth's largely invented Historia Regum Britanniae and Vita Merlini adapted the accounts of Gildas, Bede, and the Historia Brittonum by giving Britons an illustrious ancestry and period of glory, positioning the Anglo-Saxons as distinctly barbaric invaders. Despite its relatively positive account of the Britons, however, the Historia continued to legitimise the Norman Conquest, implying both that the Norman kings and landowners were the legitimate successors to a successful and just Saxon conquest of Britain and also that Bretons among the Norman forces represented a return of noble British emigrés, chased from the island by the Saxons. Geoffrey of Monmouth's reading was tremendously popular over the next four centuries, both in the original Latin and in translation into Old French, English, Welsh, and other languages, revolutionising British and international views of the Anglo-Saxon settlement (despite the criticism of Gerald of Wales and William of Newburgh, the latter of whom stated "no one but a person ignorant of ancient history [can doubt] how impertinently and impudently he falsifies in every respect"). Geoffrey's association of the Anglo-Saxon settlement with his largely invented character King Arthur has remained influential on non-scholarly understandings of the settlement into the twenty-first century.

Hints also survive of local and oral traditions about migratory histories circulating around the twelfth century, most strikingly in accounts of Havelok the Dane, which, while unhistorical, indicate that the dominance of Bede's account in surviving written history may not be representative of the origin-stories that circulated outside literate, scholarly circles.

== Early-modern views ==
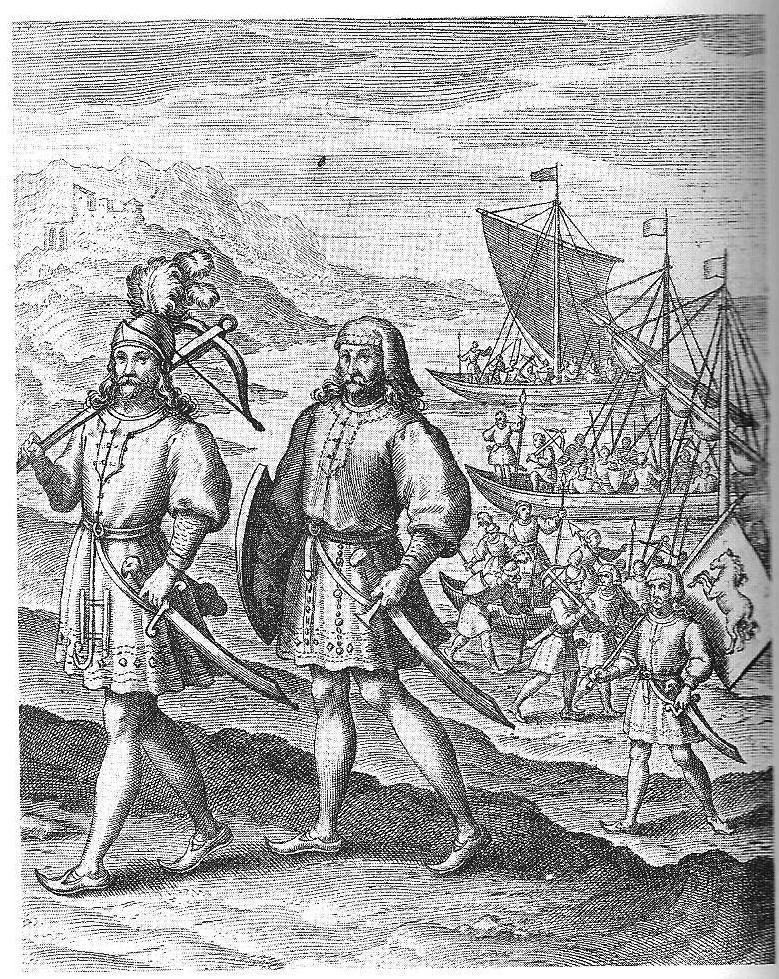
"The Arrival of the First Ancestors of Englishmen out of Germany into Britain", from A Restitution of Decayed Intelligence by Richard Verstegan (1605)

The Reformation gave Protestant English scholars a new ideological motivation for contemplating the Anglo-Saxon period: they hoped to find there evidence of a purer, distinctively English Church. The dissolution of the monasteries put into different hand many Anglo-Saxon manuscripts that had been within monastic libraries, and, although a large number of manuscripts were destroyed, historical and chronological works tended to be preserved, facilitating a religiously charged interest in the Anglo-Saxon period.

The early seventeenth-century historians Richard Verstegan (c. 1550–1640) and William Camden (1551–1623) also began to emphasise the supposed Germanic roots of the English, tracing English institutions to a Germanic love of liberty, which they argued the Anglo-Saxon settlers had imported into Britain. Racial categories were far vaguer than they would be in later centuries, but these writers did start a commonly repeated seventeenth-century theme of the Anglo-Saxons being the "most distinguished branch of the sturdy, free-growing Germanic tree". Hengest and Vortigern were sufficiently well known figures that John Aubrey's Monumenta Britannica (published 1665–93) could attribute earthworks to them without feeling the need for further explanation.

Edward Gibbon (1737–1794), in The History of the Decline and Fall of the Roman Empire (1776–1788), addressed the arrival of the Anglo-Saxons invasion within the broader context of Rome's decline. Gibbon characterized the Saxon incursions as part of the chaotic dissolution of Roman authority in the western provinces, portraying the Britons as a weakened people who fell victim to both external barbarian invasions and internal decay. He drew upon earlier sources such as Gildas and Bede, emphasizing the narrative of Britain's decline due to corruption and the loss of Roman discipline as well as reflecting Enlightenment-era perspectives on civilization and barbarism.

== Nineteenth-century views ==
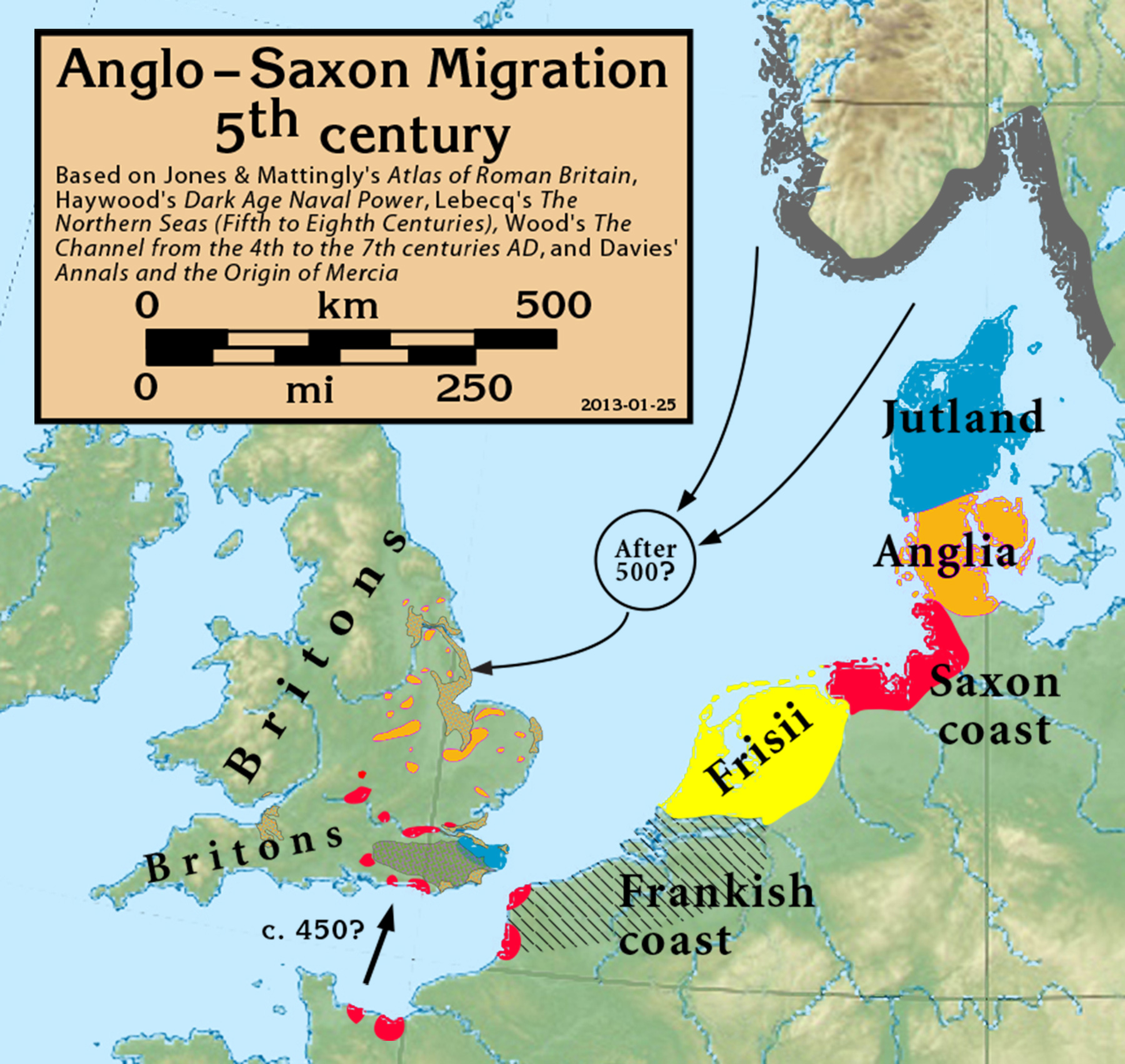
Possible routes of Anglo-Saxon migration in the 5th/6th centuries

There was, according to Donald A. White, "very little interest in the Saxon past among scholars and the general reading public at the beginning of the nineteenth century" in Britain. This changed with major studies of the period by Sharon Turner (1768–1847) and John Mitchell Kemble (1807–1857). They and other English scholars of their time were encouraged to emphasise England's Anglo-Saxon heritage by English colonialism within the British Isles, which English thinkers sought to legitimate by arguing that the English were racially distinct from the Welsh, Irish, and Scots and inherently more fit to govern; the same idea was also used to promote British colonialism elsewhere. The Napoleonic Wars with France discouraged English identification with the Normans, while the 1714 accession to the thrones of the Kingdoms of Great Britain and Ireland by the German House of Hanover encouraged English thinkers to seek historical connections between England and Germany. Additionally, liberal thinkers such as Kemble believed that England could avoid revolution by nurturing a liberal democracy derived from its Anglo-Saxon past. At the same time, as nineteenth-century history-writing developed, there was polarised debate between classicists who lionised Rome, and saw the end of Roman Britain as a disaster, and medievalists who saw Anglo-Saxon migrants as noble savages paving the way for the modern English state.

Kemble was exceptionally well informed about Old English language and literature, Anglo-Saxon historical records, and archaeology, along with comparative material from elsewhere in Europe, undertaking extensive fieldwork in Germany. His research was foundational in helping British archaeologists identify burials from the Anglo-Saxon period and in demonstrating that furnished burials found in fifth- and sixth-century eastern England shared distinctive similarities with contemporary burials in Germany, providing important support for the idea of a migration from one region to the other. Anticipating approaches that would become popular in the late twentieth century, Kemble was sceptical of the accounts of Gildas and Bede, and argued for a gradual transition from a "Keltic" and Roman to an Anglo-Saxon population in Britain, supposing that "the mass of people, accustomed to Roman rule or the oppression of native princes, probably suffered little by a change of masters, and did little to avoid it". For Kemble's English contemporaries, however, "it seemed almost treasonable to impugn the veracity of Bede, the greatest Anglo-Saxon historian, or of the Anglo-Saxon Chronicle, the earliest vernacular history in Europe". In 1849, Edwin Guest gave a vivid account of the Anglo-Saxon settlements that viewed these written sources as straightforwardly true, arguing that the Anglo-Saxons and the Britons were competing cultures, and that through a series of military campaigns, extermination, slavery, and forced resettlement the Anglo-Saxons defeated the Britons and eradicated them and their culture and language from most of England. "By grafting a patriotic zeal for the received accounts on to the congenial stock of Kemble's Germanism, Guest created an historical orthodoxy that lasted for fifty years", influencing histories that were widely read in Britain and its Empire. These included Edward Augustus Freeman (1823–1892), William Stubbs (1825–1901) and J. R. Green (1837–1883).

Freeman's 1869 Old English History for Children contrasted Germanic migration to England with the Frankish invasion of Gaul: whereas the Franks adopted the religion and language of the population, eastern Britain experienced what Freeman saw as a violent takeover and a far greater number of invaders, meaning that the Anglo-Saxons retained an exclusively "Teutonic" character which owed nothing to the expelled, exterminated or enslaved post-Roman native Britons. William Stubbs (1825–1901), in his Constitutional History of England, laid out a more conventionally Whig view which for a while became the standard authority on its subject. The book claimed to trace the development of the English constitution from the first Anglo-Saxon settlers until 1485.

During the eighteenth century, English and American intellectuals and politicians had developed a view, later labelled "Anglo-Saxonism" by scholars such as Alan Frantzen, which contended that the English, and Americans descended from them, were a superior culture due to their Anglo-Saxon racial roots. This movement extended Bede's opinion that the migration of Anglo-Saxons to Britain was divinely ordained as a means to bring the whole island of Britain under proper Christian rule to argue that later English settlement in the British Isles, Caribbean, and North America was likewise ordained by God. In America, the influential concept of Manifest Destiny was linked to a belief that American liberty was tied to Anglo-Saxon heritage. Accordingly, Thomas Jefferson (1743–1826), who had learned to read Old English, proposed that Hengest and Horsa, the legendary leaders of the first Anglo-Saxon settlers of Britain, be put on the Great Seal of the United States, calling them "the Saxon chiefs from whom we claim the honor of being descended, and whose political principles and form of government we assumed". The American preacher Josiah Strong (1847–1916), who originated the idea of the Social Gospel, also believed that the Anglo-Saxon peoples (although he specifically included all English speaking people) had, through their Germanic roots, a predisposition to both civil liberty and to a "pure spiritual Christianity" that laid the way in England to Luther's Reformation.

== Twentieth-century developments: archaeology and place-names ==
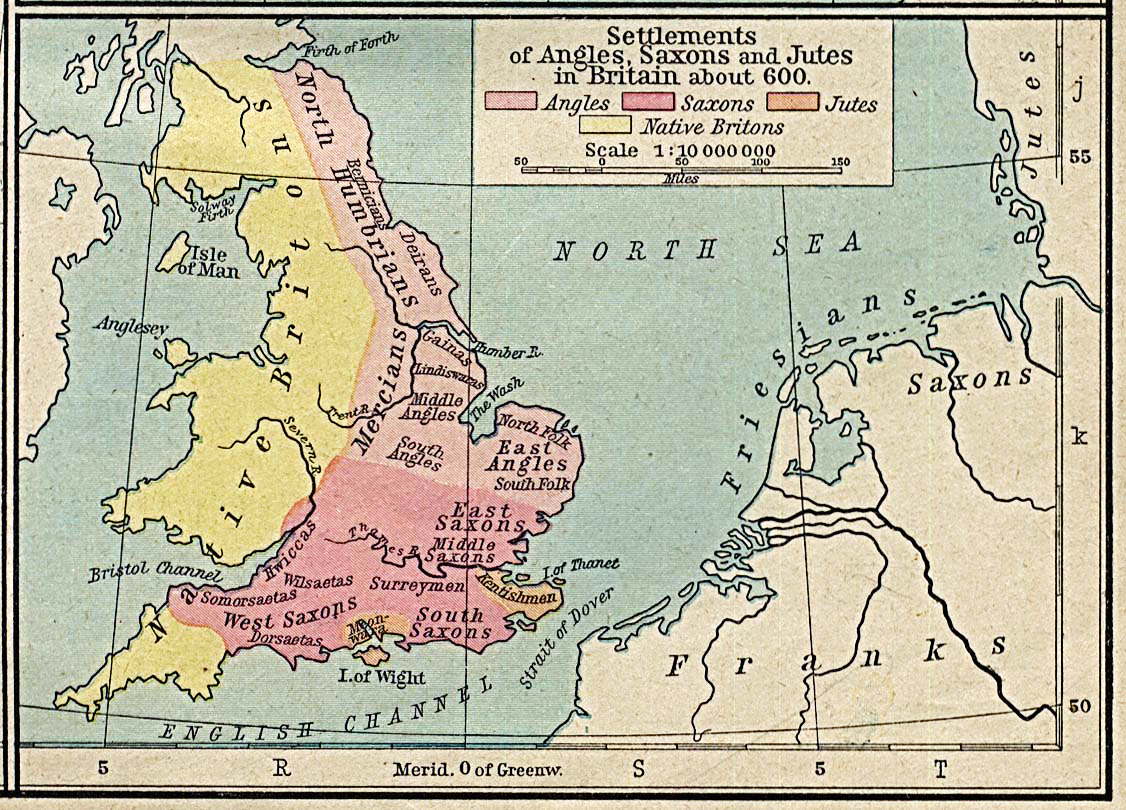
Map of Britain in the year 600 by William R. Shepherd (1871-1934), Professor of History at Columbia University in New York and cartographer, published in Historical Atlas (Henry Holt & Co., NY 1911).

In the early twentieth century, the systematic study of English place-names commenced (and was further promoted by the formation of the English Place-Name Society in 1922–23). This afforded a new source-base for the history of language in much of Britain. Place-name study, and other research on Celtic language decline in England, demonstrated that British Celtic languages had very little impact on Old English vocabulary and place-names, a fact which was taken to affirm Gildas and Bede's narratives of a violent and swift population-replacement of Britons by Anglo-Saxons. Efforts to find Celtic etymologies for English place-names grew from around the 1990s, but did not greatly shift the overall picture, and linguists' efforts to explain the linguistic evidence without assuming large-scale migration were driven by pressure from archaeologists and historians rather than by changing linguistic data.

The early twentieth century also saw archaeology professionalising in Britain, shifting from being the preserve of gentleman antiquarians to a university subject, not least through the efforts of Edward Thurlow Leeds (1877–1955), a key contributor to work on Anglo-Saxon migrations. Archaeologists were able to identify geographical variation in burial furnishings in different parts of eastern England around the fifth century, and quite different forms of material culture (in burials, settlements, and portable objects) in western and northern Britain in the same period. Assuming that these patterns correlated neatly with ethnic groups mentioned in written sources, until the 1970s, archaeologists generally saw these patterns as confirming Bede's account of the settlement of eastern Britain by different Germanic groups (Angles, Saxons, and Jutes), along with the idea that British culture persisted longer in western Britain. Nonetheless, as archaeologists realised that, far from being the forested wilderness of Victorian imagination, Roman Britain was intensively cultivated and densely populated, archaeologists or sympathetic historians such as T. D. Kendrick (1895–1979), H. P. R. Finberg (1900–1974), J. N. L. Myres (1902–1989), and Eric John (1922–2000) increasingly offered interpretations of their data independent of and even at odds with Bede's stories of Anglo-Saxon migration, identifying possible evidence for cultural and institutional continuity between Roman and Anglo-Saxon Britain.

The century also saw the rise of academic Celtic Studies, which was ideologically less inclined to put Germanic peoples at the centre of events. It was also more aware of Celtic-language source material such as the poems Y Gododdin and Canu Taliesin which, while even less straightforward as sources than texts by Gildas and Bede, suggested a dynamic post-Roman Brittonic-speaking warrior culture. Important twentieth-century challenges to Germanist perspectives in the migration debate came, for example, from Celtic studies at the Universities of Cambridge (particularly Hector Munro Chadwick, 1870–1947), Edinburgh (particularly Kenneth Jackson, 1909–1991), and Wales and Glasgow (particularly Leslie Alcock, 1925–2006).

The straightforward narrative offered by the traditional view has led it to remain popular in non-academic history-writing into the 2020s, partly because of its integration into popular myths of King Arthur (which in turn helped Alcock win funding for his archaeological digs).

== Developments 1970s–2010s, and the diffusion theory ==
Around the 1970s, scholars' preferred source materials for the migration began to undergo a revolution. In the context of post-Second-World-War Europeanism and the dissolution of the British Empire, historians, influenced by poststructuralism, began to conclude that early medieval written accounts of the settlement were unlikely to be based on a good knowledge of the events they described, and that those sources were shaped by religious and political agendas and by genre conventions in ways that reveal more about the time in which those texts were written than about the time that the texts wrote about. Influential early studies on these lines included articles by James Campbell (1935–2016), David Dumville (1949–2024), and Patrick Sims-Williams (1949–). As of 2021, their source-criticisms and those of their successors remained central to the study of Anglo-Saxon migrations; in the words of James Harland, "these scholars have created a new body of source criticism that now renders it impossible for the informed and careful reader to simply take the content of those sources at face value".

Meanwhile, archaeology was producing a rapidly expanding source-base, and becoming theoretically much more sophisticated than before. Whereas medieval textual sources for the migration revolved around aristocratic men, military conquest, and ethnic conflict, archaeology began to provide evidence from which radically different kinds of narratives could be constructed — narratives focusing, for example, on the large population of people who did not bear arms. These perspectives fundamentally, albeit slowly, changed the parameters for studying migration around the fifth century. By the 2020s, some scholarship was arguing that narratives of ethnic change of that kind that Bede and his successors wanted to tell could simply not be supported by the surviving evidence, and that alternative histories of the fifth century framed in terms of material culture or the economy were more meaningful than histories framed in terms of ethnic or political change.

Thus, in the latter half of the 20th century, archaeologists increasingly argued that Anglo-Saxon migration had constituted only a small "warrior elite", which gradually popularized a non-Roman identity among the Romano-Britons after the downfall of Roman institutions. This hypothesis suggested a large-scale acculturation of natives to the incoming language and material culture.

In support of this, archaeologists have found that, despite evidence of violent disruption, settlement patterns and land use show many continuities with the Romano-British past, despite profound changes in material culture. The elite takeover, similar to the Norman Conquest, rather than a large-scale migration, meant the bulk of the population were Britons who adopted the culture of the conquerors. Bryan Ward-Perkins argued that while "culturally, the later Anglo-Saxons and English did emerge as remarkably un-British, ... their genetic, biological make-up is none the less likely to have been substantially, indeed predominantly, British".

Within this theory, various processes leading to Anglo-Saxonisation have been proposed. One is similar to culture changes observed in Russia, North Africa and parts of the Islamic world, where a politically and socially powerful minority culture becomes, over a rather short period, adopted by a settled majority. This process is usually termed "elite dominance". One plausible mechanism, proposed in the 1990s by Heinrich Härke, is the wergild as outlined in the law code of Ine of Wessex (r. 689–726), where the wergild of an Englishman was set at a value twice that of a Briton (Old English wealh) of similar wealth. While demonstrating that Ine's kingdom included Britons, some of whom were very prosperous (owning at least five hides of land, which gave thegn-like status), the difference in status between the Anglo-Saxons and Britons could both have produced an incentive for a Briton to seek to acquire Anglo-Saxon identity (presumably by adopting English) and conferred a reproductive advantage on Englishmen.

By around 2010, a new consensus had emerged among scholars that the Anglo-Saxon settlement did not involve cataclysmic demographic change, but rather the migration of a relatively small number of incomers, who seized political control in what became eastern England, and to whose culture the local population assimilated, with a more extreme version claiming that the British gene pool was substantially unaltered from the Britain's original settlement in the late Stone Age. Correspondingly, by 2012, textbooks on the history of the English language accepted that what Matthew Townend called 'the standard explanation' for the spread of English within Britain was political dominance by a fairly small number of Old English-speakers, whose language was adopted by large numbers of Britons while leaving little detectable trace of this language-shift.

The popularity of this view faded when modern autosomal genetic clustering shows the British and Irish clustering genetically far more closely with other North European populations, rather than Iberians. Further, more recent whole genome research has broadly supported the idea that genetic differences between the English and the Welsh have origins in the settlement of the Anglo-Saxons rather than prehistoric migration events.

== Twenty-first century: genetics ==
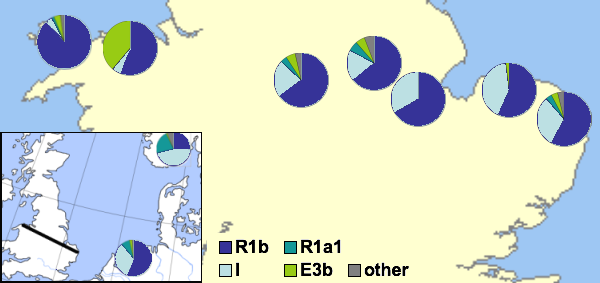
Map of Y-chromosome distribution from data derived from "Y chromosome evidence for Anglo-Saxon mass migration" by Weale et al. (2002)

In the twenty-first century, genetic research has emerged as a major new form of evidence about Anglo-Saxon migration. At first these were techniques that traced back male only and female only lineages and groups them with other people in different areas and countries. Later on there was a greater use of graveyard remains and greater sophistication of genetic studies. This has helped to drive a synthesis of migration and acculturation, with a return to a more migrationist perspective but with an emphasis on the regional variation of the ratio of Anglo-Saxon and Romano-Britons.

Heinrich Härke explains the nature of this agreement:

It is now widely accepted that the Anglo-Saxons were not just transplanted Germanic invaders and settlers from the Continent, but the outcome of insular interactions and changes. But we are still lacking explicit models that suggest how this ethnogenetic process might have worked in concrete terms.

Early studies of British ancestry using Y-chromosome DNA, which traces paternal lineages, revealed significant male-line genetic input from continental Europe, especially from areas like northwestern Germany and Denmark. A 2002 study by Michael Weale found that in some regions of England, 50–100% of paternal ancestry could be traced to areas such as Friesland and Norway. In 2003, Cristian Capelli's research, based on a larger sample, found continental paternal input ranging from 25% to over 50% in areas such as Kent, East Anglia, the East Midlands, and Yorkshire, although it was unable to distinguish between Anglo-Saxon and Viking contributions.

A 2015 large scale population genetics study looked at regional patterns of genetic differentiation across the UK. It confirmed notable Anglo-Saxon ancestry in central and southern England (10–40%) and also identified distinct regional genetic clusters in other parts of the United Kingdom, challenging the idea of a single, homogeneous Celtic ancestry.

Recent whole genome sequencing of ancient DNA collected from skeletons found in Iron Age, Roman and Anglo-Saxon era burials, have shown that there was a migration into Great Britain that the ancestry of the modern English population in the south and east have a larger share of genetic material from Anglo-Saxon migrants than in other parts of the island. Research on burials from Cambridgeshire in 2016 showed evidence of early intermarriage, with recent Germanic immigrants and Romano-British natives buried in the same cemeteries with grave goods of the same material culture and showing that Anglo-Saxon DNA is currently higher in eastern England and lower in traditionally Celtic areas such as Wales and Scotland. Another 2016 study found that burials in Roman-era York were significantly genetically closer to the modern population of Wales than that of Yorkshire. A 2018 Irish focused study found that modern southern, central and eastern English populations were of "a predominantly Anglo-Saxon-like ancestry", while those from northern and southwestern England had a greater degree of indigenous origin.

The 2022 Gretzinger study used DNA samples from different periods and regions demonstrated that there was significant immigration of women as well as men from the area in or near what is now northwestern Germany, from the Roman period until the 8th century with significant intermarriage with Romano-Britons as well as significant adoption of new burial styles.

== Debates ==
=== Estimating migrants' numbers ===
Different descriptions of the Anglo-Saxon settlement of Britain demand different assumptions about the relative numbers of pre-settlement inhabitants of Britain and Germanic-speaking migrants, leading to an extensive sub-debate about precise population numbers. However, there is no straightforward evidence for these numbers, and scholars have not reached a precise consensus either on the population of fourth-century Britain or the number of migrants who entered Britain around the fifth century.

The population of fourth-century Britain is usually estimated at between 2 and 4 million. From this figure, Heinrich Härke and Michael Wood have argued that, taking into account declines associated with political collapses, the population of what was to become Anglo-Saxon England had fallen to 1 million by the fifth century.

Estimates for migrants range between 20,000 and 200,000. A computer simulation showed that a migration of 250,000 people from Denmark to East Anglia could have been accomplished in 38 years with a reasonably small number of boats. Härke has posited a scenario in which the Anglo-Saxons, in expanding westward, outbred the Britons, eventually reaching a point where their descendants made up a larger share of the population of what was to become England. Härke concluded that "most of the biological and cultural evidence points to a minority immigration on the scale of 10 to 20% of the native population. The immigration itself was not a single 'invasion', but rather a series of intrusions and immigrations over a considerable period, differing from region to region, and changing over time even within regions. The total immigrant population may have numbered somewhere between 100,000 and 200,000 over about a century, but the geographical variations in numbers, and in social and ethnic composition, should have led to a variety of settlement processes." Within 200 years of their first arrival, the settlement density has been established as an Anglo-Saxon village every 2–5 kilometres (1.2–3.1 miles), in the areas where evidence has been gathered. Given that these settlements are typically of around 50 people, this implies an Anglo-Saxon population in southern and eastern England of 250,000. The number of migrants therefore depends on the population increase variable. If the population rose by 1 per cent per year (slightly less than the present world population growth rate), this would suggest a migrant figure of 30,000. However, if the population rose by 2 per cent per year (similar to India in the last 20 years), the migrant figure would be closer to 5,000. The excavations at Spong Hill revealed over 2,000 cremations and inhumations in what is a very large early cemetery. However, when the period of use is taken into account (over 200 years) and its size, it is presumed to be a major cemetery for the entire area and not just one village; such findings point to a smaller rather than larger number of original immigrants, possibly around 20,000.

It has also been proposed that the Britons were disproportionately affected by plagues arriving through Roman trade links, which, combined with a large emigration to Armorica, could have substantially decreased their numbers.

=== Regional Variations ===
The spread of Anglo-Saxon culture happened at different times, and in different ways, in different parts of Britain. According to Toby Martin, "Regional variation may well provide the key to resolution, with something more akin to mass migration in the south-east, gradually spreading into elite dominance in the north and west." This view has support in the place-name evidence. In the southeastern counties of England, Brittonic place-names are nearly nonexistent, but moving north and west, they increase slightly in frequency.

East Anglia has been identified by a number of scholars, including Härke, Martin, Catherine Hills, and Kenneth Dark, as a region in which a large-scale continental migration occurred, possibly following a period of depopulation in the fourth century. Lincolnshire has also been cited by Hills and Martin as a key centre of early settlement from the continent. Alexander Mirrington argues that in Essex, the cultural change seen in the archaeological record is so complete that "a migration of a large number of people is the most logical and least extreme solution." In Kent, according to Sue Harrington and Stuart Brookes, "the weight of archaeological evidence and that from literary sources favours migrations" as the main reason for cultural change.

Immigration into the area that was to become Wessex occurred from both the south coast and the Upper Thames valley. The earlier, southern settlements may have been more prosaic than descriptions in the Anglo-Saxon Chronicle imply. Jillian Hawkins suggests that powerful Romano-British trading ports around the Solent were able to direct significant numbers of Germanic settlers inland into areas such as the Meon valley, where they formed their own communities. In areas that were settled from the Thames, different processes may have been at play, with the Germanic immigrants holding a greater degree of power. Bruce Eagles argues that the later population of areas such as Wiltshire would have included large numbers of Britons who had adopted the culture of the socially dominant Saxons, while also noting that "it seems reasonable to consider that there must have been sufficient numbers of widely dispersed immigrants to bring about this situation in a relatively short space of time."

In the northern kingdom of Bernicia, however, Härke states that "a small group of immigrants may have replaced the native British elite and took over the kingdom as a going concern." Linguist Frederik Kortlandt agrees, commenting that in this region "there was a noticeable Celtic contribution to art, culture and possibly socio-military organization. It appears that the immigrants took over the institutions of the local population here." In a study of place-names in northeastern England and southeastern Scotland, Bethany Fox concluded that the immigration that did occur in this region was centred on the river valleys, such as those of the Tyne and the Tweed, with the Britons' culture persisting longer in the less fertile hill country, becoming acculturated over a longer period.

Even as late as the eighth century, the kingdoms of Wessex, Mercia and Northumbria housed significant numbers of people recognisable as Britons.

=== The Apartheid Hypothesis ===
A paper by Thomas et al. developed an "apartheid-like social structure" theory to explain how a small proportion of settlers could have made a larger contribution to the modern gene pool. This view has been criticized by JE Pattison, who suggested that the Y-chromosome evidence could still support the idea of a small settlement of people without the apartheid-like structures. It has been proposed, too, that the genetic similarities between people on either side of the North Sea may reflect a cumulative process of population movement, possibly beginning well before the historically attested formation of the Anglo-Saxons or the invasions of the Vikings. The 'apartheid theory' has received a considerable body of critical comment, especially the genetic studies from which it derives its rationale. Problems with the design of Weale's study and the level of historical naïveté evidenced by some population genetics studies have been particularly highlighted.

=== Criticisms of using genetic techniques ===
Some scholars have questioned whether cultural identity can solely come from a person's ancestry. Other historians have cast doubt on the interpretations put on the genetic evidence, particularly its revival of models of large scale Germanic migration, pointing out that it is a very young area and so prone to sudden revisions and that the lack of exposure to historical methods means that they have missed developments in other areas. Concern has also been raised about the studies not accounting for how ethnic groups can come from quite distinct ancestors and also how these studies may be used by the far right.

== Themes ==
=== Specific dates ===
From Bede—who took an exceptional interest in chronology, inventing anno Domini dating—into the twentieth century, historians have often been preoccupied with assigning developments in the Settlement to specific years. Since the 1970s, influenced by processual archaeology, historians have moved away from trying to assign complex social changes to individual years.

==== 410 and "the end of Roman Britain" ====
Into the 2020s, 410 was frequently given as the year in which "the Romans" or their "legions" left Britain, never to return, or for "the end of Roman Britain". This dating is suggested by a number of sources, including: the fact that bulk imports of Roman coins ended around that time (though by the twenty-first century roughly the year 400 was more accepted); Constantine III leading troops from Britain to Gaul around 407 prior to the sack of Rome in 410; the Chronica Gallica of 452's account of a Saxon raid on Britain in 409 or 410; and the understanding of some scholars that Bede placed the end of Roman rule in Britain in 410. However, twenty-first-century scholarship generally rejects the idea that Roman culture, civic administration, or military organisation ended abruptly in 410, rather seeing different kinds of decline in different regions and domains from the fourth century into the sixth. Paul Gorton has argued that Bede promoted the idea of 410 specifically in an effort to present the English as natural successors to Roman rule in Britain, in a parallel to Alaric the Goth's sack of Rome in that year.

==== 449 and the "adventus Saxonum" ====
According to Guy Halsall, by the early twentieth century, British schoolchildren were routinely taught that "the English came to England in 449, a date as evidently precise and important as 1066". A phrase used by the twelfth-century chronicler Henry of Huntingdon, "adventus Saxonum" ("arrival of the Saxons"), was adopted by nineteenth- and twentieth-century historians as a technical term for this event, even though it does not appear in earlier sources.

Assuming that Germanic migration to Britain could be understood as a single event, Bede dated it to

the time of the Emperors Valentinian and Marcian (450–5; HE 1.15). From Gildas, he knew that the appeal to Aëtius took place after his third consulate, and produced no response. From Prosper and Marcellinus he could date that consulate to the year he calculated as AD 446. He also knew from Gildas of periods of resistance to the barbarians, prosperity, and then famine and plague after the appeal. Thus he made an educated guess that the invitation to the Saxons was made five to ten years later.

The Anglo-Saxon Chronicle later interpreted this date as 449, and this came to be accepted by generations of later historians.

Since Bede's date demonstrably rests on inference from Gildas, whose account modern historians view as profoundly unreliable, and on the dubious assumption that the initial migration of Saxons could be dated to a single year, it is no longer accepted. In fact, both textual and archaeological evidence indicates that a new "Anglo-Saxon" culture with parallels in northern Germany already became prominent in Britain by the 430s, well before the 450s as reported by Bede. Historians such as Halsall have also pointed out that a Germanic population may have already been present under Roman rule for many years before 430 without this being obvious in the archaeological record, because of the prestige which Roman material culture still had. Accordingly, from the 1970s, scholars abandoned efforts to assign Anglo-Saxon settlement to a single year, and relied on archaeological rather than textual evidence to date the process.

The Historia Brittonum, written in the 9th century, attempted similar calculations to Bede with different outcomes. It gives two different years, but was apparently based on the idea that the first migration happened in 428, possibly based on the real date of the visit of Germanus in 429.

=== Saxon Liberty ===
The migration of the Anglo-Saxons formed the basis of a long-lasting thesis that aspects of common law, personal liberty and representative government were unique to England and other Germanic-speaking countries and that these had originated from the Germanic nature of the migrants.

Anglo-Saxon settlers were often seen — particularly by the Radical Whig faction of seventeenth- and eighteenth-century England — as the foundation of English legal and political liberty, with Anglo-Saxon settlers bringing in a system of governance based on customary law, folkmoots and the rule of law which was later disrupted by the Norman Conquest. Accordingly, Algernon Sidney (1623–1683) used the Anglo Saxon arrival as a link between the supposed liberty of the German tribes described by Tacitus in Germania and the Anglo-Saxon model of elected kings.

One of the main arguments was the "Teutonic germ theory" which argued that many British and so American institutions came about due to the racial characteristics inherited from the Anglo-Saxon invaders of Britain. It later evolved into the Nordicism of the 20th century which also encompassed Celtic and Norman influences in Britain.

In 1932, the American historian Charles A Beard (1874–1948) argued against the nineteenth-century idea that representative government and Anglo-Saxon liberties were derived from "the forests of Germany" or from Anglo-Saxon local assemblies, and named a number of historians who he thought were guilty of this.

== Fringe theories ==
=== Pre-Settlement Germanic-speakers ===
In 2006, Stephen Oppenheimer (along with some non-scholarly commentators around the same time) argued that some of the native tribes like the Belgae, identified as Britons by the Romans, may have been Germanic-language speakers, and that this may account for the lack of evidence for Celtic influence on English in a context where settlement by Germanic-speakers in the fifth century was relatively small. Most scholars disagree with Oppenheimer's theory due to insufficient evidence of Germanic languages in Britain in Roman-period artefacts and records.

=== British Israelism and Christian Identity ===
The British Israelite movement is a belief that the British people, in most cases particularly the Anglo Saxon component are some or all of the ten lost tribes of Israel. The Anglo-Saxon settlement of Britain is seen by most of this movement as part of the exodus of the tribes who after leaving Israel, went to the Black Sea and then to the Carpathians, and finally up the Danube from southern and eventually Northern Germany. The Anglo-Saxon Federation of America was a group active in the mid twentieth century which originated the far right ideology of Christian Identity which believes that Northern Europeans (and not simply Anglo-Saxons) are the lost tribes of Israel. Christian Identity has far more explicitly influenced and been influenced in turn by the far right than the original British Israelism or the continuing British Israelite movement outside of Christian Identity.

=== Role in far-right ideas ===
The debate about the nature of the Anglo Saxon migration into Britain has influenced branches of the far right outside the orbit of British Israelism. The influential Anglo-Saxon Clubs of America in 1920s Virginia directly invoked the supposed racial purity derived from the Anglo-Saxon migration to justify their lobbying for eugenics and anti-miscegnation laws such as Virginia's Racial Integrity Act. The idea of the Saxons as a racially pure group has been a continuing motif of the far right.
