= Threekingham =

Village in the North Kesteven district of Lincolnshire, England

Coordinates: 52.914035°N 0.378225°W

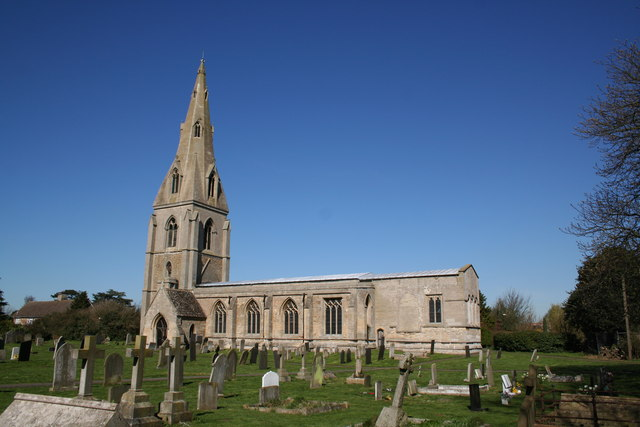
- St Peter's Church, Threekingham

- Location within Lincolnshire
- Population: 233 (2011)
- OS grid reference: TF091364
  - London: 100 mi (160 km) S
- Civil parish: Threekingham
- District: North Kesteven
- Shire county: Lincolnshire
- Region: East Midlands
- Country: England
- Sovereign state: United Kingdom
- Post town: SLEAFORD
- Postcode district: NG34
- Police: Lincolnshire
- Fire: Lincolnshire
- Ambulance: East Midlands
- UK Parliament: Grantham and Bourne

Threekingham (sometimes Threckingham or Tricengham) is a village and civil parish in the North Kesteven district of Lincolnshire, England. The population of the civil parish at the 2011 census was 233.

== Geography ==
It is situated on the A52 Grantham to Boston road, 6 miles (10 km) south from Sleaford, and close to the A15 Threekingham Bar roundabout. Mareham Lane, the Roman Road aligned with King Street, crosses the A15 at Threekingham.

The A52 bypass was built in 1967-68, costing £47,000.

== History ==
The name of the town means "home of Tric's people." Tric is a Brittonic personal name, though it is unclear whether Tric himself was a Briton or whether he was descended from Anglo-Saxon migrants but given a name borrowed from Celtic speakers who possibly lived nearby. Either way, Threekingham itself is a Germanic name, given by speakers of Old English.

A folk etymology that developed in the later part of the Anglo-Saxon period derives the name from "home of the three kings," supposedly because three Danish kings were buried there; however, this is incorrect.

Threekingham parish church is dedicated to St. Peter ad Vincula (St Peter in chains). The village public house is the Three Kings Inn.

The Domesday Book of 1086 records two churches in Threekingham; St Peter and St Mary. The church of St Mary was at Stow Green. Funerary remains have been found at Stow Green date back to the eleventh and twelfth centuries, and the church survived until the eighteenth century. It is possible that it was the site of an Early Medieval nunnery, founded in the late seventh century by St Werburgh and dedicated to St Ætheldreda. It was probably destroyed by the Danes c.870.

Historian David Roffe describes St Ætheldreda's connection with Stow Green, saying the site, called "Ædeldreðestowe," was chosen because the saint's staff reportedly took root and sprouted leaves there.

'Stow' is well known to be a place name denoting a holy place, or a burial place. According to Eilert Ekwall, "Old English 'stow' is recorded in senses such as 'place', 'inhabited place', 'holy place, hermitage, monastery', probably 'church'."

The Medieval Stow Fair was held nearby, less than 1 mile (1.6 km) to the south. It is possible that it was the site of the early medieval nunnery founded in the late seventh century by Saint Werburh, dedicated to Saint Æthelthryth, and probably destroyed by the Danes c. 870.

There are ancient earthworks and a mound called Threekingham Beacon to the west of the village. The post-medieval garden features overlie much older earthworks and tumuli. The remains of a moated manor house are in Hall Lane.

There is a Whalebone Arch marking the entrance to Laundon Hall.
