= Mawthorpe =

Hamlet in the East Lindsey district of Lincolnshire, England

Coordinates: 53.234485°N 0.18451°E

- Location within Lincolnshire
- OS grid reference: TF458730
  - London: 120 mi (190 km) S
- Civil parish: Willoughby with Sloothby
- District: East Lindsey
- Shire county: Lincolnshire
- Region: East Midlands
- Country: England
- Sovereign state: United Kingdom
- Post town: Alford
- Postcode district: LN13
- Police: Lincolnshire
- Fire: Lincolnshire
- Ambulance: East Midlands
- UK Parliament: Louth and Horncastle

Mawthorpe is a hamlet in the East Lindsey district of Lincolnshire, England. It is situated 2 miles (3 km) south from Alford and 1 mile (1.6 km) north-west from Willoughby. It is in the civil parish of Willoughby with Sloothby.
