= Bonthorpe =

Hamlet in the East Lindsey district of Lincolnshire, England

Coordinates: 53.231800°N 0.219445°E

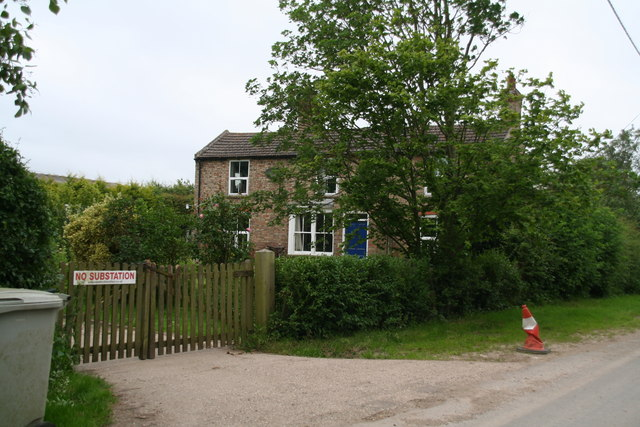
- Driving through Bonthorpe

- Location within Lincolnshire
- OS grid reference: TF482728
  - London: 120 mi (190 km) S
- Civil parish: Willoughby with Sloothby
- District: East Lindsey
- Shire county: Lincolnshire
- Region: East Midlands
- Country: England
- Sovereign state: United Kingdom
- Post town: ALFORD
- Postcode district: LN13
- Police: Lincolnshire
- Fire: Lincolnshire
- Ambulance: East Midlands
- UK Parliament: Louth and Horncastle

Bonthorpe is a hamlet in the East Lindsey district of Lincolnshire, England. It is situated 1 mile (1.6 km) north-east from the village of Willoughby. It is within the civil parish of Willoughby with Sloothby.

Bonthorpe was known as Brunetorp in 1086, located for governance purposes in the wapentake of Calcewath in the South Riding of Lindsey.
