= St Helena's Church, Willoughby =

Church in Lincolnshire, England

Coordinates: 53°13′28″N 0°12′20″E

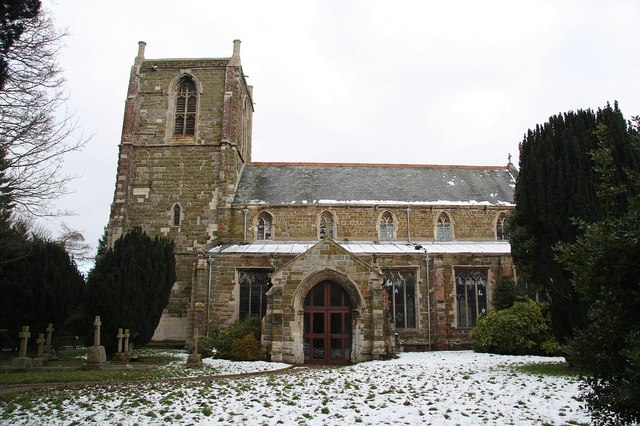
The church in 2009

St Helena's Church, sometimes known as St Helen's Church, is an Anglican church in the village of Willoughby, Lincolnshire, England. It is grade I listed, and dates in part from the 14th century.

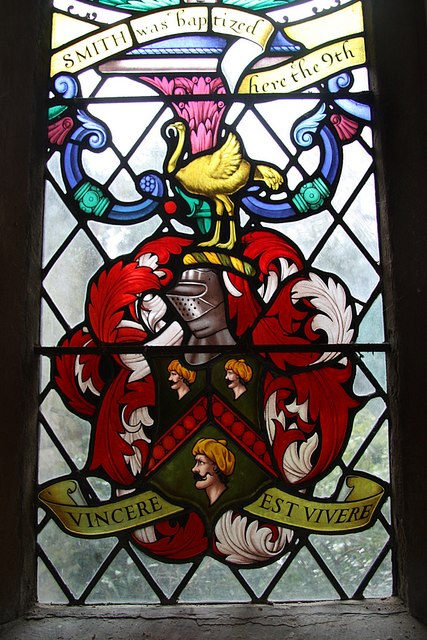
John Smith's arms in one of the windows

Windows in the church commemorate John Smith, one of the founders of Jamestown in Virginia, United States, who was christened here. Nicholas Antram, in his revised Lincolnshire volume in the Pevsner Buildings of England series, notes the building's scale and its "early" Perpendicular Gothic style.

There are two graves in the churchyard in the care of the Commonwealth War Graves Commission.

St Helena's is an active place of worship within the Alford Group of Churches.

== Sources ==
- Pevsner, Nikolaus; Harris, John; Antram, Nicholas (2002). Lincolnshire. The Buildings of England. New Haven, US and London: Yale University Press. ISBN 0-300-09620-8.
