= Willoughby with Sloothby =

Civil parish in Lincolnshire, England

Coordinates: 53.220435°N 0.237309°E

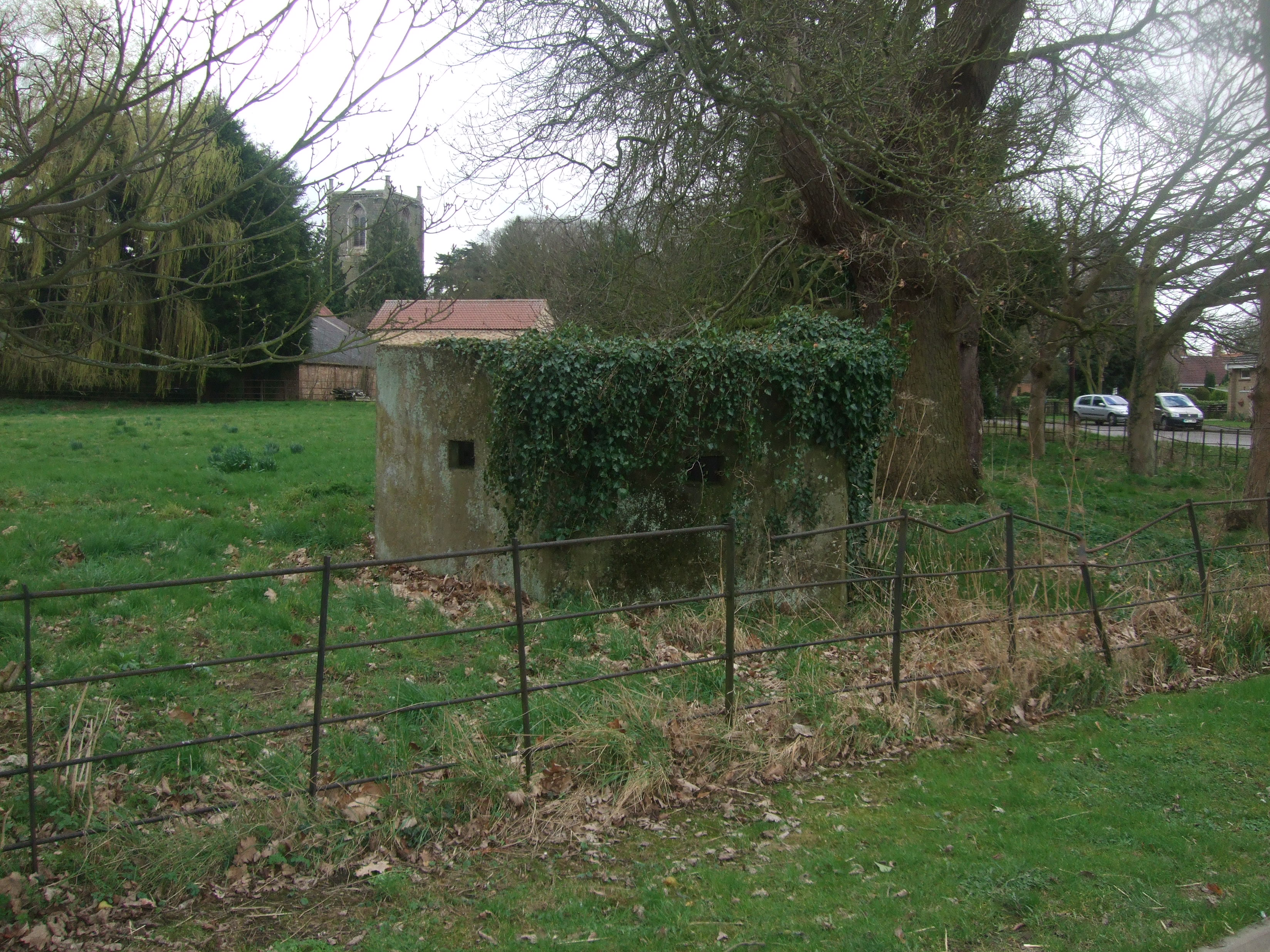
- Willoughby Pillbox and the tower of St Helena's Church in the village

- Location within Lincolnshire
- District: East Lindsey
- Shire county: Lincolnshire
- Region: East Midlands
- Country: England
- Sovereign state: United Kingdom
- Post town: ALFORD
- Postcode district: LN13
- Police: Lincolnshire
- Fire: Lincolnshire
- Ambulance: East Midlands
- UK Parliament: Louth and Horncastle

Willoughby with Sloothby is a civil parish in the East Lindsey district of Lincolnshire in the East Midlands of England. The parish includes the settlements of Willoughby and Sloothby as well as the hamlets and villages of Bonthorpe, Mawthorpe, Hasthorpe and Habertoft. The parish lies north west of Skegness, between the A1028 road and A158 road to the south west and the A52 road to the north east. A small area in the west of the parish, mainly Willoughby Wood, is within the Lincolnshire Wolds National Landscape.

Willoughby and District Parish Council serves both this parish and Claxby St Andrew.

As of 2025 there are six listed buildings (St Helena’s Church, Willoughby at grade I, the others at grade II), one scheduled monument and a grade II listed garden in the parish.
