= Threekingham Bar =

Road junction in Lincolnshire, England

Coordinates: 52.91847°N 0.41155°W

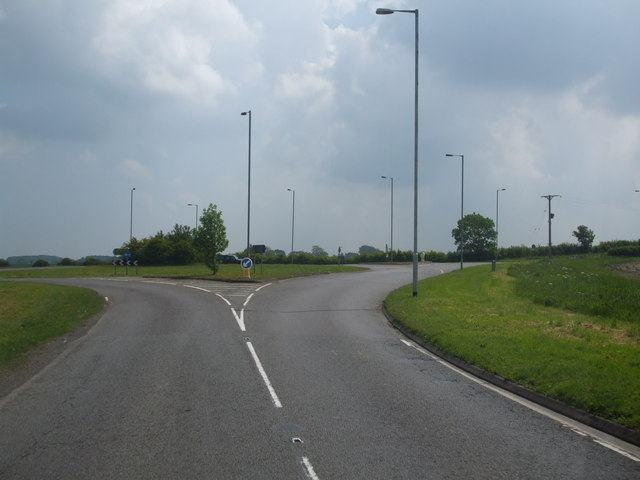
Threekingham Bar roundabout, heading North, by Glyn Drury

Threekingham Bar is the name given to interception of the A52 (Grantham to Boston) and A15 (Peterborough to Lincoln and Hull) roads, 1 mile (1.6 km) to the west of the village of Threekingham, in Lincolnshire, England

The interception is arranged as a small modern roundabout. Both roads are single carriageway. The countryside is undulating, and the A52 descends into a valley to the west. The location is rural, with no human habitation.

The name dates it to the turnpike era. The A52 approximately follows the route of Salters Way.

An 18th-century mile post is in the verge, 220 yards (200 m) south from the roundabout.

== See also ==
- List of road junctions in the United Kingdom
