= St Peter's Church, Threekingham =

Coordinates: 52.9116°N 0.3812°W

St Peter's Church
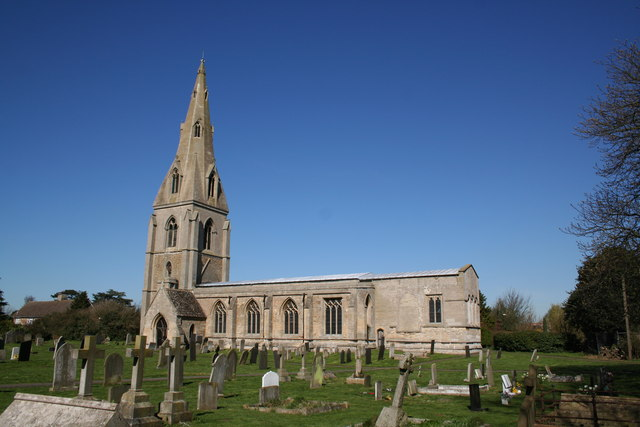
- St Peter's Church, Threekingham

- Location within Lincolnshire
- OS grid reference: TF 08954 36138
- Location: Threekingham, Lincolnshire
- Country: England
- Denomination: Church of England

Architecture
- Functional status: Active
- Architectural type: Church

Specifications
- Materials: Stone

St Peter's Church is a church in Threekingham, Lincolnshire. It is dedicated to St. Peter ad Vincula (St Peter in chains). It became a Grade I listed building on 1 February 1967. A Saxon church, mentioned in the Domesday Book of 1086, was located here but the Normans began rebuilding the church in 1170. Part of the church, notably the door and porch, is dated to 1310. A sundial on the turret to the left of the porch says "1688 Gifte of Edmond Hutchinson, Gentleman". The church contains three 14th-century tombs, one of which is inscribed "Hic intumulatur Johannes quondam dominus de Trikingham" ('Here is buried John, former lord of Threekingham'). The spire was restored in 1872.
