= Stow Fair, Lincolnshire =

Medieval fair in Lincolnshire, England

Coordinates: 52.902043°N 0.374377°W

Stow Green Hill
- Location within Lincolnshire
- OS grid reference: TF094350
  - London: 100 mi (160 km) S
- Civil parish: Threekingham
- District: North Kesteven
- Shire county: Lincolnshire
- Region: East Midlands
- Country: England
- Sovereign state: United Kingdom
- Post town: SLEAFORD
- Postcode district: NG34
- Police: Lincolnshire
- Fire: Lincolnshire
- Ambulance: East Midlands
- UK Parliament: Sleaford and North Hykeham

Stow Fair was an English medieval fair inaugurated in 1233 and held at Stow Green Hill in Lincolnshire.

The Prior of Sempringham was granted permission in 1268 to hold this annual fair, from 23 to 25 June, confirming an earlier charter. The fair continued until living memory, being run as a horse fair until 1954.

It seems likely that earlier fairs were held on the same days, one of which is the feast day of St Ætheldreda, long associated with the site. Historian Graham Platts' view is that there should be scepticism over a belief that the fair developed from earlier summer solstice rites.

The North Kesteven Council has erected an information board at the site, with historical text and a photograph of the horse fair in 1908.

== Location ==
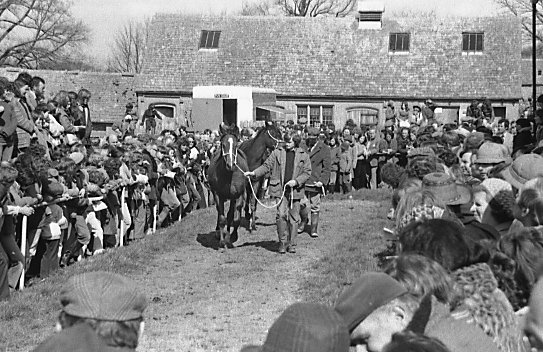
Stow Horse Fair, 1978

Stow Fair was held at the now Stow Green Hill, next to Mareham Lane between Sleaford and Rippingale via Threekingham. This, is thought to be the route of a Roman Road aligned with King Street.

The location is on the edge of the Limestone hills, looking North over the fen country toward Sleaford. It is toward the end of a small ridge of high ground pushing east into the fen from Walcott. The field is around 108 feet (33 m) above sea level. It would have been a commanding position at the time.

A nearby farm is called Stow Farm, and the lane into Horbling is called Stow Lane. The area is signposted "Stow" from the A15 at Threekingham

Few Roman remains have been found along the route of Mareham Lane.

A fenced field at the corner of Mareham Lane and Stow Lane bears a notice board with historical information. The land is owned by the Crown Commissioners and farmed under a tenancy. Pedestrian access to the site is permitted, although metal detection is forbidden. Originally the fair could have extended over a larger area, and the field is a Scheduled Ancient Monument.

== See also ==
- Artisanal food
- Bazaar
- Charter
- Charter fair
- Costermonger
- Hawker
- History of marketing
- List of Renaissance fairs
- Market town
- Marketing
- Market (place)
- Market hall
- Merchant
- Peddler
- Retail
- Souk or souq
- Street vendor
- Town privileges
