= Sloothby =

Village in Lincolnshire, England

Coordinates: 53.213°N 0.237°E

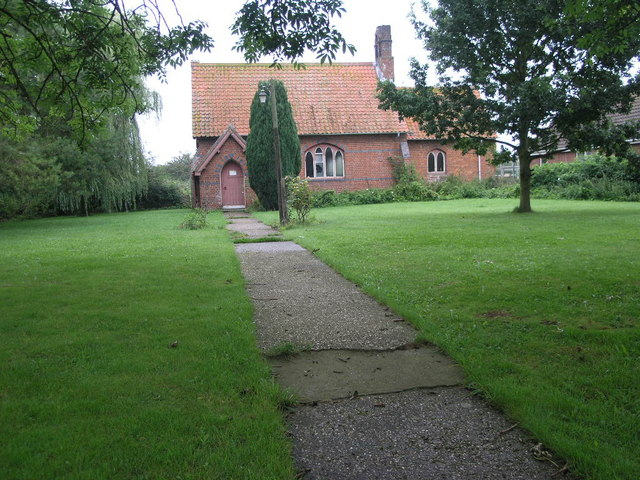
- Sloothby Mission Church

- Location within Lincolnshire
- OS grid reference: TF495707
  - London: 120 mi (190 km) S
- Civil parish: Willoughby with Sloothby
- District: East Lindsey
- Shire county: Lincolnshire
- Region: East Midlands
- Country: England
- Sovereign state: United Kingdom
- Post town: ALFORD
- Postcode district: LN13
- Police: Lincolnshire
- Fire: Lincolnshire
- Ambulance: East Midlands

Sloothby is a small village in the East Lindsey district of Lincolnshire, England. It is situated approximately 5 miles (8 km) south from the Lincolnshire Wolds, an Area of Outstanding Natural Beauty. Sloothby is in the civil parish of Willoughby with Sloothby, just over 1 mile (1.6 km) south-east from the village of Willoughby and 7 miles (11 km) north-west from the coastal resort of Skegness. In 1870-72 the township had a population of 242.

The village is mentioned five times in the Domesday Book of 1086.

The village has several farms, a Wesleyan chapel dating from the 1890s, and a small mid-Victorian church – formerly known as "Sloothby Mission" – which is now closed. There is also a small antiques store in the village.

== Governance ==
An electoral ward in the same name as the civil parish exists. This ward stretches south to Bilsby with a total population taken at the 2011 census of 2,027.
