= Susan Harrington =

British early-medieval archaeologist

Susan Harrington FSA

Academic background
- Thesis: Aspects of gender and craft production in early Anglo-Saxon England with reference to the kingdom of Kent (2003)
- Doctoral advisor: Martin Welch

Academic work
- Discipline: Archaeology
- Institutions: UCL; University of Durham

Susan K Harrington FSA is an early-medieval archaeologist and Honorary Senior Lecturer at University College London.

== Career ==
From 2006 to 2009 she was the research assistant on the Leverhulme Trust funded project 'Beyond the Tribal Hidage: Anglo-Saxon kingdoms in southern England AD 400-750'. She subsequently was part of the research team on the 'People and place: the making of the Kingdom of Northumbria AD 300-800' project at the University of Durham, also funded by the Leverhulme Trust.

She was elected as a fellow of the Society of Antiquaries of London on 9 June 2011.

== Select publications ==
- Brookes, S., Harrington, S., and Welch, M. 2005. "Documenting the dead: creating an online census of Anglo-Saxon burials from Kent", Archaeology International 9. 28-31 doi:10.5334/ai.0908
- Brookes, S. and Harrington, S. 2010. The kingdom and people of Kent : AD 400-1066 : their history and archaeology.
- Harrington, S. 2016. "From warp and weft to spear and spindle: Gender identity and textile manufacture in early Anglo-Saxon England", in Sophia E. Kelly and Traci Ardren (eds) Gendered Labor in Specialized Economies: Archaeological Perspectives on Female and Male Work. University Press of Colorado.
