= Tathwell =

Village in the East Lindsey district of Lincolnshire, England

Coordinates: 53.327719°N 0.020420°W

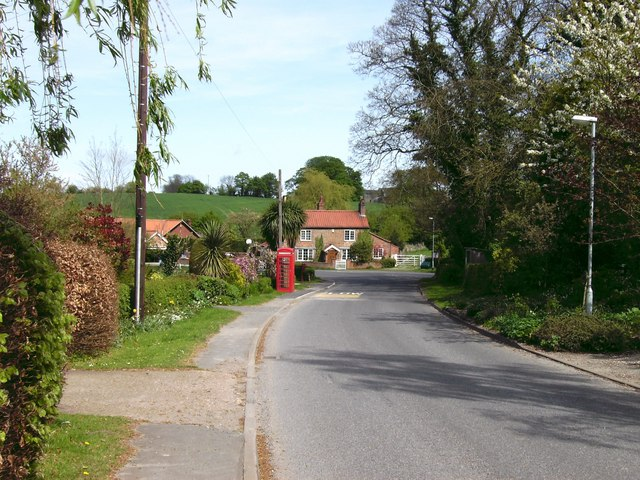
- Tathwell village

- Location within Lincolnshire
- Population: 253 (2011)
- OS grid reference: TF319830
  - London: 135 mi (217 km) S
- District: East Lindsey
- Shire county: Lincolnshire
- Region: East Midlands
- Country: England
- Sovereign state: United Kingdom
- Post town: Louth
- Postcode district: LN11
- Police: Lincolnshire
- Fire: Lincolnshire
- Ambulance: East Midlands
- UK Parliament: Louth and Horncastle

Tathwell is a village in the East Lindsey district of Lincolnshire, England.

Tathwell is situated approximately 3 miles (5 km) south from the market town of Louth. The hamlet of Dovendale, alongside the A153 road to the west of the village is in the parish. The hamlet of Haugham lies about 1 mile (1.6 km) south-east of Tathwell. Cadwell Park motor racing circuit is about 2 miles (3.2 km) south of Tathwell.

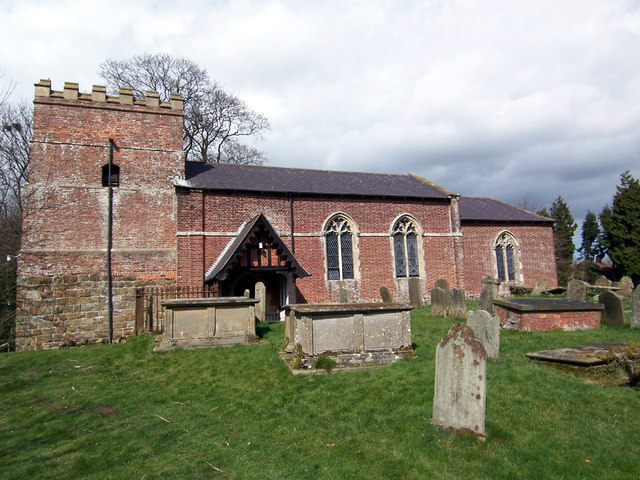
St Vedast's Church, Tathwell

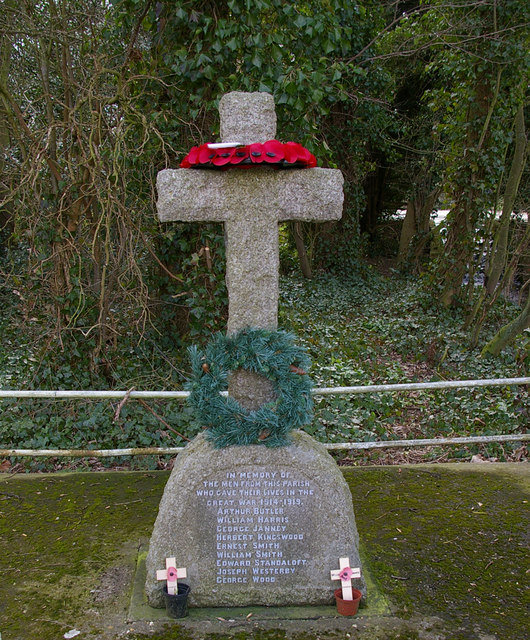
Tathwell War Memorial

The parish church, dedicated to Saint Vedast, also houses The Hamby Monument, a wall monument originally constructed around 1620, and later restored by their descendants, the Chaplin family. (Sir John Hamby's daughter Elizabeth married in 1657 John Chaplin, son of Sir Francis Chaplin.)

Tathwell Hall at Tathwell was the longtime home of the Chaplin family, a branch of the Chaplin family of Baronets of Blankney, who served as MPs for Lincolnshire and who were descended from Sir Francis Chaplin, Lord Mayor of London in 1677. The family originated at Bury St Edmunds, Suffolk. It was through a marriage with the Hamby family that the Chaplins acquired Tathwell. The family became active in Lincolnshire, and in subsequent years many members of the Chaplin family stood for Parliament from Lincolnshire.

Near Cadwell and in Tathwell parish is Tathwell Long barrow. It is surrounded by trees, and in the middle of a field with no footpath, but visible from the road.

Tathwell's war memorial cross is sited on a corner of the village main crossroads.

== See also ==
- Maps for Tathwell Long Barrow
