= Germanic Myth =

Germanic Myth refers to an idealized or valorized view of German tribes living to the North of Rome in the first century CE. It takes inspiration from Germania, a 1st-century account of Germanic tribes by Tacitus. One of the earliest idealization of the Germanic peoples including their myth is attributed to Tacitus himself. In his criticism of the Romans of his time, who he viewed were decadent, he wrote about the Germanic tribes and their culture, highlighting their positive traits in his attempt to shame his people into behaving better.

Later the scholars who promoted the Germanic myth include Heinrich von Treitschke, who idealized the Teutonic Knights, describing them as a combination of fierce warriors, severe rulers, pious monks, and statesmen. The scholar promoted such myth as ideal, describing them as a grand example of German manner (Gesittung). It is explained that mythology and reality were never completely separated in the German mind as demonstrated in recurring motif called volk or volkish essence in stories about the Teutonic peoples. This pertains to the power or inner quality possessed by the German people that allow them to be triumphant despite being constantly engaged in conflict.
