= Swallow, Lincolnshire =

Village in Lincolnshire, England

Coordinates: 53.510515°N 0.226464°W

Swallow
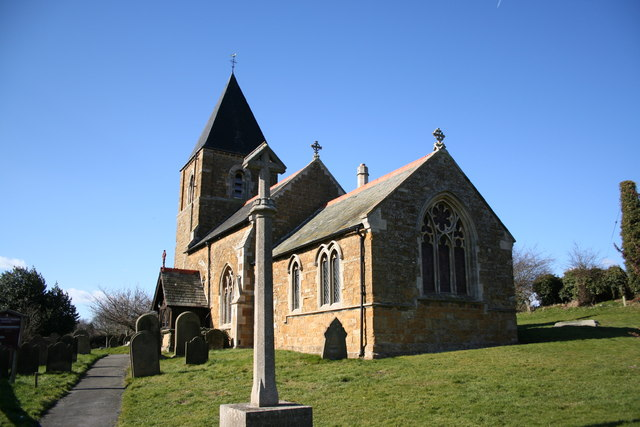
- Holy Trinity Church, Swallow

- Location within Lincolnshire
- Population: 289 (2011)
- OS grid reference: TA177030
  - London: 145 mi (233 km) S
- District: West Lindsey
- Shire county: Lincolnshire
- Region: East Midlands
- Country: England
- Sovereign state: United Kingdom
- Post town: MARKET RASEN
- Postcode district: LN7
- Police: Lincolnshire
- Fire: Lincolnshire
- Ambulance: East Midlands
- UK Parliament: Gainsborough

Swallow is a small village and civil parish in the West Lindsey district of Lincolnshire, England, on the A46 road 4 miles (6.4 km) north-east from Caistor. The population (including Cabourne and Cuxwold) taken at the 2011 census was 289.

== History ==
=== Etymology ===
The name Swallow has been variously written as Sualan (Domesday Book), Suawa, Swalwe and Swalewe (all twelfth century). The Oxford Dictionary of Place Names equates the name with Swale, suggesting that the village is called after a fast-moving river of that name, with eau being French for water. Bob Willey, who used to live in the village, put forward the theory that it is closer to the German schwall, meaning "flood" and suggesting that water gathered on the clay bottom land below the fast-draining chalky hills.

=== Early history ===
Archaeological finds, including flint tools at Swallow Vale Farm, indicate the presence of early settlements in Swallow. Other traces include cropmark traces of four possible barrows, a pit and a boundary ditch on Cuxwold Road, and similar barrows behind Grange Farm and on the eastern edge of the village south of Grimsby Road. Straddling the Limber parish border are the remains of an undated ring ditch in Swallow Wold Wood.

Further finds include Roman pottery and coins, and the apparent remains of a Saxon leather worker. Ridges found in the field above the skeleton are further indications of a pre-Norman conquest settlement.

=== Middle Ages ===
The Domesday Book does not mention Swallow in detail, but in 1086 Lincolnshire was remote from the rest of the kingdom: cut off from the south by the undrained Fens, and occupied by hostile and rebellious Danes (Vikings). At this time, Swallow consisted of at least 35 households.

In Swallow the important landowners were Norman (the Bishop of Bayeux was William the Conqueror's half-brother Odo of Bayeux), though low in the Norman hierarchy. Others mentioned in Domesday include Sualan (Archbishop of York), Count Alan, Roger de Poitou and Alfred of Lincoln.

By the 13th century Count Alan's manor had passed into the hands of the Lascelles family, who may have been resident landlords and were closely involved with the parish church. Their successors, the Conyers family, were certainly non-resident. From around 1200 the manor of Swallow was held by the Augustinian abbey of Wellow in Grimsby. The Cistercian nuns of Nuncotham also had a holding, as did Thornton Abbey and Saint Leonard's Priory (Grimsby) by the time of the Reformation.

In 1530 George St. Pol bought the former Lascelles Manor, and in 1543 he acquired the former abbey lands from John Bellewe and Robert Brocklesby, to whom they had been granted following the Dissolution of the Monasteries.

A survey in the early 14th recorded that Swallow had 26 households and 31 taxpayers, while a Poll Tax count in 1372 found 110 people over the age of fourteen. There were 18 taxpayers in 1525 but only 12 in 1543, and 20 households in 1563. These numbers remained fairly constant for the next three centuries.

Apart from the church, there are no obvious reminders of the medieval village. On closer examination, a few earthworks show a village of two centres. To the west there was a series of narrow closes and yards fronting Caistor Road with a back lane near where the present A46 runs. This and the ploughing strips are cut through by the much later Limber Road. Towards the end of the medieval period there were further closes on the south side of the road running down to the stream.

The Eastern Settlement shows signs of one or more monastic farms, a moated manor site and a mill.

=== Enclosure ===
Swallow dates from the 19th century enclosure. Until 1805 the majority of villagers had strips in two large fields, as well as grazing rights on the wold, the moor and in Horse Pasture.

However, this system started to lose viability as early as the Tudor period. From the mid 17th century, some Swallow residents described themselves as farmers rather than cottagers. By the end of the 18th century, improved agricultural methods and animal husbandry, together with the need to move from subsistence farming to large-scale food production for growing numbers of city and town dwellers, made change inevitable.

Swallow was enclosed by the Swallow Inclosure Act 1805 (45 Geo. 3. c. xciii), and the award was completed in 1809. Apart from two small parcels awarded to the Bishop of Lincoln and Trinity College, Cambridge, and the Rector's Glebe of 96 acres (390,000 m^{2}), virtually all the land was awarded to Lord Yarborough. The Rector received corn rents in lieu of tithes. There were also about 65 acres (260,000 m^{2}) in the village and around the church which were old enclosure, and 4 acres (16,000 m^{2}) were for roads.

Within a few years, farms which still exist today – Vale, Wold, Mount, Grange and Rookery – had been built. Hedges were planted, new roads and lanes were built, and Lord Yarborough had begun the tree planting which so radically altered the countryside.

At enclosure, and for some time afterwards, Swallow's houses were simple, single-storey buildings of mud and stud. These were gradually replaced by brick cottages, with the majority of those on Grimsby Road and Chapel Lane being built around 1875. Of the 45 houses in Swallow listed in the 1881 census, about two thirds survive.

In early 2008, a housing development project was completed in the village on the meadow by the beck.

=== Parish registers and census ===
The parish registers date back to 1671. It was rare for a family to remain in the village for more than two generations, and the majority of labourers moved on after a few years to get a better job or to leave farming. Even the better off farmers tended (being tenants rather than owners) to remain no more than two or three generations.

In the spring of 1841, during the Hungry Forties, fourteen children (about a quarter of all the village's children) died. No adults died that year. In 1870, a further six children died, the last two of scarlet fever.

The registers also record the burial, in 1909, of an unknown man whose decayed remains had been found after 2–12 years' exposure.

The 1851 census shows 127 males and 90 females in 57 households. Ten years later the number of dwellings had reduced to 41 while the population had risen by 22.

The 1881 census shows 78% of all working males in farming, with 16% in allied trades – 92% in total. Of the adults, only 10% were born in Swallow, although only three were born outside Lincolnshire.

== Economy ==
The earliest recorded shop in the village was at the forge in 1856; the blacksmith's business itself continued until well into the 20th century. There was a tobacconist's kiosk near Crossroads Cottages, the remains of which can be seen in a garden on Grimsby Road.

Later, a combination shop and post office was in Chapel Lane. In 1961 a new shop was opened at the corner of Cuxwold Road and Chapel Lane; it closed in 1976.

The village pub is the Swallow Inn. It was preceded by the White Hart, which closed in 1953.

== Landmarks ==
=== Church ===
The oldest part of the church dates from the period of the Norman conquest or perhaps slightly earlier. The lower portion of the tower is in Saxo-Norman style; the west door has a rounded Romanesque arch, as has the window above it. The much wider arch dividing the tower from the nave has typically Norman dog-tooth carving, but this may be partly or wholly Victorian restoration.

A carving on the south wall of the tower may be part of the original 14th-century rood, thought to be broken during the Reformation. William Andrew, the rector from 1564 to 1612, supported the reformation and may have been responsible both for this and for the change of dedication from St Salvatoris ("Saint Saviour") to Holy Trinity. The remains of the rood were unearthed in the churchyard and placed in the tower early in the 20th century.

In 1553 the church was reported to have three "gert bells" and one sanctus bell. However, the steeple collapsed sometime before 1663, and falling bells destroyed the south aisle. In 1670 both aisles were demolished (the north aisle having apparently been ruinous even before the collapse) and the following year the three bells were sold to cover the £140 cost of demolition and restoration, an incident referred to in the local rhyme:

You must pity poor Swallow People
Who sold the bells to mend the steeple

Sir Philip Tyrwhitt, who paid the cost initially, reportedly bought one bell and undertook to buy another. The bell was cast by Thomas Warner and Sons of London in 1864. The steeple was again restored in 1868, when the upper part of the tower was built in neo-Norman style.

The nave was originally built in the 13th century, but much of the current construction is Victorian. The carving around the south door dates from the 1880s. The font is genuinely Norman, dating from the late 11th or early 12th century.

The window in the south wall is Edwardian, given in memory of the rector, James Wallis Loft, and his wife.

The north aisle was built during the church's restoration of 1883–84, when the old horse box pews, the gallery and the three-decker pulpit were removed. The pillar was also added at this time. The east window in memory of the Farrow-Bingham family also dates from the 1883 restoration.}

There is no south aisle now, but traces of it and the Lady chapel built in the 13th century can be seen on the exterior of the south wall. The 13th-century chancel was largely rebuilt in 1868 at a cost of £350. Traces of the original doorway can be seen on the exterior of the south wall. The pillar piscina is an example of Norman stonework.

Further major repairs were carried out in 1968 (at a cost of £650) and 1976 (£2,100).

In 1931 Swallow was united with the parish of Cabourne, and in 1979 Swallow with Cabourne was amalgamated with the benefices of Rothwell with Cuxwold, Thoresway with Croxby, and Nettleton as the Swallow Group of Parishes.

==== Churchyard ====
The churchyard has been a burial site for well over a thousand years. In 1765 a turnpike cut through some of the ancient burial ground, and in 1954 improvements to the then A46 took a further part of the churchyard. It was during these excavations that the Swallow Giant was unearthed – a man, possibly a Viking warrior, who stood between 6 feet (1.8 m) and 6 feet 4 inches (1.93 m) tall.

Parts of the churchyard were levelled in 1970, causing damage to some gravestones. In the early 1980s a major tidying of the churchyard and the neighbouring corner green removed rotten trees and facilitated mowing. Since then there has been extensive tree-planting throughout the village, including the graveyard and green.

=== War memorial ===
A war memorial commemorates three soldiers who died in the First World War: Lieutenant Cecil Walter Henry Askey (died 5 April 1918), Gunner Walter Day (died 25 September 1918) and Stoker Kerdon Wilkin (died 7 March 1916).

=== Rectories ===
The Old Rectory, now a private residence, was built in 1864 to a design by James Fowler of Louth, the diocesan architect, at a cost of £1,700. Unlike the farmhouses, which were all built in variations on the vernacular style, it is clearly identifiable as a mid-Victorian building with its Gothic ornamentation.

The present rectory, built on Beelsby Road in 1958, is a more modest building in post-war style.

=== Chapels ===
As in many Lincolnshire villages in the 19th century, the people of Swallow practiced Methodism. A Primitive Methodist chapel was built in 1844 for £98, on a site on the Cuxwold Road donated by Lord Yarborough. In 1855 it was enlarged, but thereafter congregations declined and it closed in 1916. The building was eventually demolished in 1994.

A larger Wesleyan chapel was built on the north side of Back Lane (subsequently Chapel Lane) in 1863. It was designed to hold a congregation of 140, although membership never rose above 40. The chapel closed in 1967 and was demolished shortly afterwards, although a small fragment of the wall's base remains.

=== Housing since the Second World War ===
After the Second World War, Swallow saw a number of changes. Like many similar villages, it became less of an estate village and more of a commuter-cum-retirement village with a number of cottages passing into private hands as the more intensive and mechanised agriculture necessitated by the need to feed the country during the war made them redundant as the homes of farm labourers. It isn't until the 1970s that the Parish Registers begin to show any real variety of trades and professions.

From 1965 parcels of land were sold for building, and since then new houses have been built at the rate of about one a year in a wide variety of styles and materials.

=== Village pond ===
The Church and the avenue remain, although the house (Rookery) is gone, and the high bank is largely replaced by a retaining wall, and the pond was filled in during the 1960s and the land sold to make a garden for Pond Cottage. The site now has on it a modern house.

Until 1949 the village was served by a parish pump near to the entrance to the present playing field, although many houses had their own wells. Rookery Farm's water was pumped by a windmill. In 1949 piped water came to the village, pumped from Barnoldby and then fed to Swallow by gravity from Beelsby Top. Electricity followed in 1950. Mains sewerage did not arrive until 1970, and mains gas later still. Outlying houses are still served by septic tanks and are without gas, although most now have mains water.

=== School and village hall ===
Although Swallow was a two classroom school for about fifty years, numbers fluctuated considerably; in 1941, when the only extant school log begins, it was a one teacher school, and was again on many subsequent occasions. November 1948 brought an excellent report from the school inspectors citing Swallow as a model for Rural One Teacher Schools; less than a year later Miss Marris was appointed assistant to Miss Frances Cox. On 4 November 1949, the school was on display when D.R. Hardman, Parliamentary Secretary to the Minister of education, visited.

In June 1946 work began on installing a school kitchen, but in July 1949, following a huge intake of ten new pupils, the canteen became the infant classroom and the end cloakroom the cookhouse. In January 1959 it dispensed with the services of a cook and had meals sent from the central canteen.

The school was closed in May 1968 and the children transferred to Caistor Primary School where they joined existing classes, in some cases for just one term before going up to secondary school. A number of mothers kept their children from school for a period because of the inadequate transport arrangements. It was not the first time that Swallow children had been sent to Caistor; from 31 March to 30 November 1945, following the illness and resignation of Joan Marrows as headmistress, Swallow School was closed.

After the school closed the ownership of the building reverted to Lord Yarborough, and in 1969 he sold it to the village for a nominal £150 on condition that it would be returned to him if it could not be maintained as a village hall for twenty-one years.

In 1990 it was handed over to the village, the Parish Council taking over the trusteeship shortly thereafter together with responsibility for the day-to-day running expenses, leaving the Village Hall Committee to raise money for capital projects. There is an irregular programme of social evenings, talks, quizzes and demonstrations approximately monthly. Most years there are more major events – a craft and garden show, an exhibition, or a traditional village fete (usually in conjunction with the Church). An extension was built to house a bar. The Village Hall Committee is also responsible for maintaining the playing field for which the Parish Council pays Sutton Estates a quarterly peppercorn rent. Some play equipment was paid for by fund-raising events in the 1990s.

After 2005 the hall was improved, and is a venue for small conferences, parties and wedding receptions.

== Transport ==
Prior to the Grimsby Turnpike Act of 1765 the road (track) through Swallow was a green road running from Swallow to Rothwell until the Second World War when it was ploughed up to grow crops and never re-instated. The new turnpike road cut through the ancient burial ground and tolls were paid to travel along it.

In 1954 a road straightening and widening scheme on the then A46 (Caistor Road) through the village took a further part of the churchyard, and during these excavations the skeleton of the Swallow Giant was unearthed.

After many years, Swallow was by-passed in 1992 (at the expense of a mature tree, farmland, hedgerows and the football field) and Grimsby Road and Caistor Road became cul-de-sacs.

Work on the bypass started in November 1991. The contract of £2.25m was given to Morrison Shand, for 3.6km, to take 52 weeks. It would be finished by July 1992, taking 8 months. The bypass was opened on Thursday 23 July 1992, by Bill Wyrrill, leader of the county council.
