= Cuxwold =

Village in Lincolnshire, England

Coordinates: 53.493894°N 0.234267°W

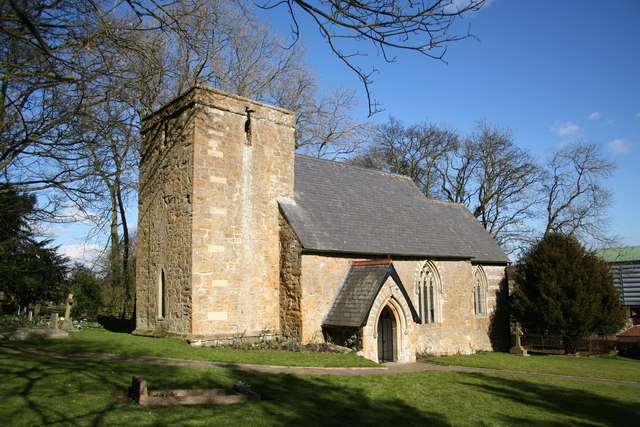
- Church of St Nicholas, Cuxwold

- Location within Lincolnshire
- OS grid reference: TA172011
  - London: 140 mi (230 km) S
- Civil parish: Swallow
- District: West Lindsey
- Shire county: Lincolnshire
- Region: East Midlands
- Country: England
- Sovereign state: United Kingdom
- Post town: Market Rasen
- Postcode district: LN7
- Police: Lincolnshire
- Fire: Lincolnshire
- Ambulance: East Midlands
- UK Parliament: Gainsborough

Cuxwold is a village and former civil parish, now in the parish of Swallow, in the West Lindsey district of Lincolnshire, England. It lies in the Lincolnshire Wolds, 4 miles (6 km) east from Caistor and 10 miles (16 km) south-west from Grimsby. In 1931 the parish had a population of 98. On 1 April 1936 the parish was abolished and merged with Swallow.

Cuxwold Grade II* listed Anglican church is dedicated to St Nicholas. The church, of 11th-century origin but with an incorporated earlier Saxon tower arch, was considerably restored and rebuilt in 1860 by James Fowler. The restoration was carried-out under instruction from Henry Thorold, who, in the 1870s, added a monument to his family within the church. Within the village is a further Grade II listed building, Cuxwold Hall, built in 1860.

Cuxwold was the location of an emergency landing ground for airplanes during the Second World War and is now the home of Grimsby Airfield.
