= Claxby St Andrew =

Village in Lincolnshire, England

Coordinates: 53.220244°N 0.170777°E

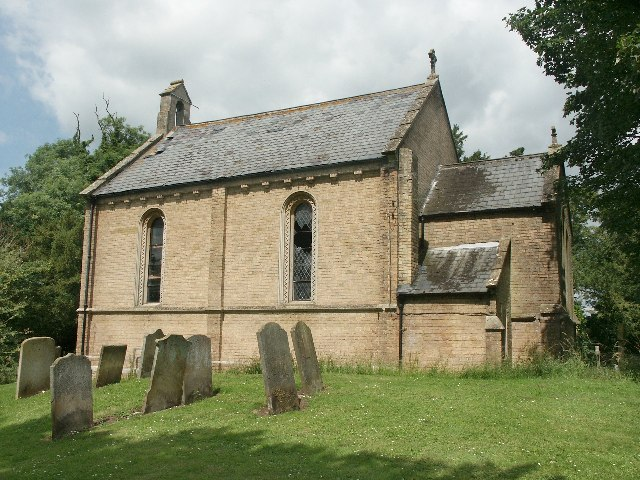
- Church of St Andrew, Claxby St Andrew

- Location within Lincolnshire
- Population: 43 (2021 census)
- OS grid reference: TF450714
  - London: 115 mi (185 km) S
- Civil parish: Claxby St Andrew
- District: East Lindsey
- Shire county: Lincolnshire
- Region: East Midlands
- Country: England
- Sovereign state: United Kingdom
- Post town: Alford
- Postcode district: LN13
- Police: Lincolnshire
- Fire: Lincolnshire
- Ambulance: East Midlands
- UK Parliament: Louth and Horncastle

Claxby St Andrew (sometimes known as Claxby), is a village and civil parish about 3 miles (5 km) south of Alford, in the East Lindsey district of Lincolnshire, England. In 2021 the parish had a population of 43.

The parish church, which was dedicated to Saint Andrew, was built in 1846 to replace an earlier thatched structure. It was declared redundant by the Diocese of Lincoln in 1990 and sold the same year. It is a Grade II listed building.

Claxby Manor House (also known as Claxby Hall) was built around 1760, reputedly for Samuel Dashwood as the Dower House to Well Hall. It later became the vicarage, and is a Grade II listed building.

What is now known as Claxby Manor House is an entirely different building situated across the valley.

Claxby Chalk Pit, also known as Mill Hill Quarry, is a Site of Special Scientific Interest and nature reserve which lies east of the village.

Willoughby and District Parish Council serves both this parish and Willoughby with Sloothby.
