= Willoughby, Lincolnshire =

Village in the district of East Lindsey, Lincolnshire, England

Coordinates: 53°13′28″N 0°12′06″E

Willoughby
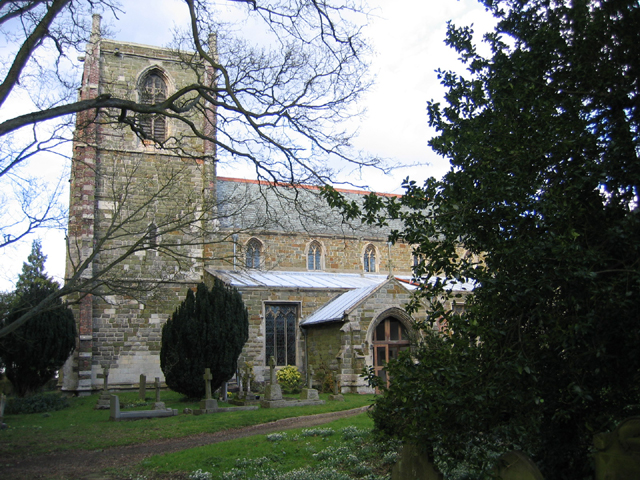
- St Helena's Church, Willoughby

- Location within Lincolnshire
- Population: 400
- OS grid reference: TF476719
  - London: 125 mi (201 km) S
- Civil parish: Willoughby with Sloothby
- District: East Lindsey
- Shire county: Lincolnshire
- Region: East Midlands
- Country: England
- Sovereign state: United Kingdom
- Post town: ALFORD
- Postcode district: LN13
- Police: Lincolnshire
- Fire: Lincolnshire
- Ambulance: East Midlands
- UK Parliament: Boston and Skegness

Willoughby is a village in the district of East Lindsey, Lincolnshire, England. It is situated three miles (five kilometres) south from the market town of Alford, and on the edge of the Lincolnshire Wolds, an Area of Outstanding Natural Beauty.

== History ==
The name 'Willoughby' derives from the Old Norse wilig-by meaning 'willow tree farm/settlement'.

To the rear of Tavern Way is a field containing a scheduled ancient monument, a medieval earthwork of an unknown date.

The most notable person to have come from Willoughby is John Smith, one of the leaders of the Virginia Colony in North America. He was born and raised in the village, and christened at St Helena's Church in 1580. When Smith was 16 years old his father George Smith died and was buried at the same church on 3 April 1596. Smith was connected to the Native American girl Pocahontas, daughter of the chief of the Powhatan confederacy tribes. Smith met her when settling Jamestown in the 17th century. There have been many fictional representations of their encounter and surrounding events, including Disney's animated musical film Pocahontas and its sequel. The cottage where Smith lived still exists and is in one of the village lanes. On the anniversary of the founding of the Jamestown settlement hundreds of Americans come to the village to see where Smith lived.

== Geography ==
The village is close to the coast, with Skegness 12 miles (19 kilometres) away and Chapel St Leonards seven miles (eleven kilometres) away. The village is within the civil parish of Willoughby with Sloothby, which includes the hamlets of Sloothby and Hasthorpe.

Willoughby has two main farms. One is on the Clover Industrial Estate and the other is on Hanby Lane opposite the petrol station. Both farms have wide field access and pasture sheep in the summer.

== Governance ==
Willoughby is in the civil parish of Willoughby with Sloothby. Willoughby and District Parish Council serves this parish and also Claxby St Andrew.

== Population ==
All together, the 2011 Census counted 592 residents of the Willoughby with Sloothby parish. The population was gender balanced, with 50.3% male and 49.7% female. Most residents were white (98.6%) who declared as Christian (71.1%).

Residents of Willoughby with Sloothby live primarily in small, aging households. Of the 252 households, 20.6% were a single person, 52.8% were two people, 12.3% were three people, and 14.3% comprised four or more people. Most families had no dependent children (76.6%), and 64.3% of households were headed by a person aged 55 or over.

== Architecture ==
=== Residential ===
Although several new houses have been built in the village, such as those on Tavern Way and John Smith Close, the village has seen little growth. Newer houses have been built to the west of the village on the old grounds of the tavern. Older houses are to the east of the village near the church.

The most recent development is a group of new bungalows on Station Road.

There is a large manor house at the eastern edge of the village toward Bonthorpe. The older main building was recently renovated. In the 1980s, a new hall and extension was constructed and in the 1990s and 2000s further improvements were carried out.

Another large house in the grounds of the church is the rectory on Station Road.

=== Commercial ===
At present there is only one shop/petrol station selling convenience goods and a former blacksmith's shop which sells and repairs gardening equipment. A mobile fish and chip shop visits the village weekly. The public house is called The Willoughby Arms. The village used to be larger, with more services that included a butcher, a post office and a dairy shop. Changing demographics and the loss of the railway line and station caused the decline of these businesses.

=== Religious ===
St Helena's Church dates in part from the 14th century and is a grade I listed building.

== Facilities ==
=== Education ===
The village has a small primary school, St Helena's Church of England Primary School. The school, which opened in 1948, serves students from preschool to Year 6 (ages 4 through 11). As of July 2011 the school had 106 pupils.

=== Transportation ===
In 1848, the village was connected to the rest of the county by the East Lincolnshire Railway, a line from Peterborough to Grimsby. Willoughby railway station was also the point where the Mablethorpe line began. Since the rail line closed in 1970, villagers have had to depend on motor-vehicle travel. The original platform, former line and station houses still exist.

There are a few daily buses operated by the Lincolnshire bus company, Translinc, and Stagecoach in Lincolnshire. Three school bus services run through the week to Alford.

There are three main roads through the village – Church Road, Station Road and Hanby Lane.

== Community and events ==
The village community life revolves around the church. Some residents attend Sunday service and many use it for weddings, funerals and baptisms. St Helena's Church is one of many in the parish. The rural parish stretches as far as Chapel St Leonards.

The Village Hall and Green sponsors numerous events throughout the year including a garden competition run by the Willoughby Garden Club, the annual Summer Fair and a Christmas dinner. The Hall is also used for private events. The Bowls Club meets weekly and players are free to use the green near the Village Hall whenever they please.

The playing field hosts the annual School Sports Day and many other functions. Many locals use the recently installed play equipment. Near the playing field are allotments.
