= Mareham Lane =

Road in England

Mareham Lane is an unclassified road between Graby and Sleaford in Lincolnshire, England. It is approximately 10.6 miles (17.1 km) long.

== The Roman Road ==
For most of its length Mareham Lane follows the route of a minor Roman road, and the name is also used for that Roman road from Bourne to the original ford at Sleaford and perhaps on to Lincoln (Lindum Colonia).

== Margary numbers ==
Ivan Margary allocated the following Margary numbers in his classification scheme:

- RR260 Bourne-Sleaford
- RR262 Sleaford-Bracebridge Heath
Selection of photographs from the collection on Wikimedia Commons
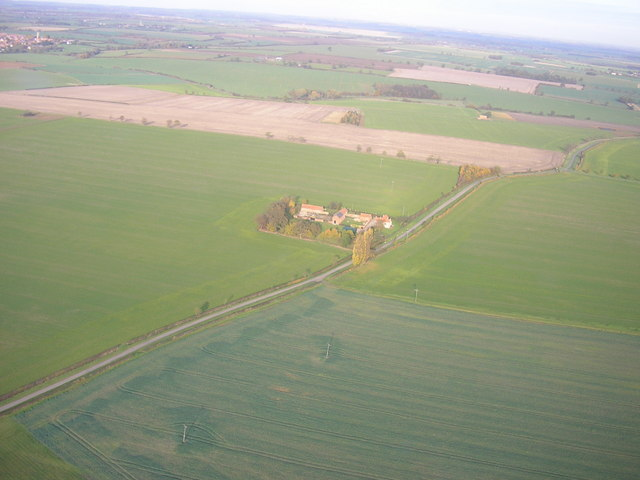
Beacon Hill farm on Mareham Lane

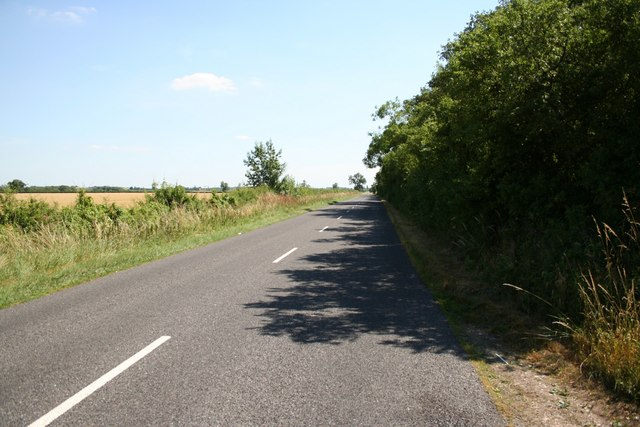
Mareham Lane near Scredington

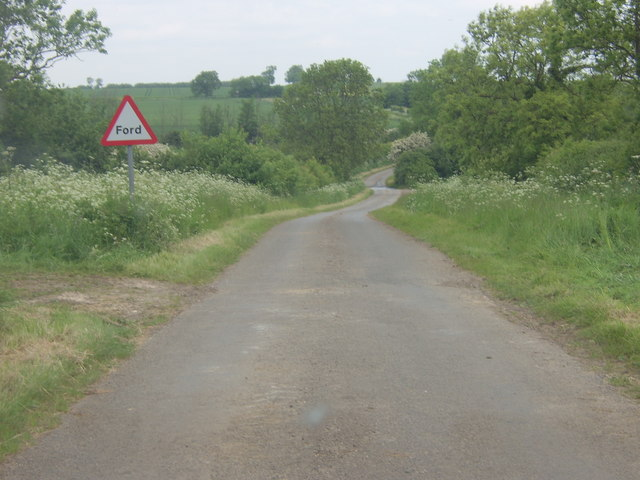
Ford just north of Graby

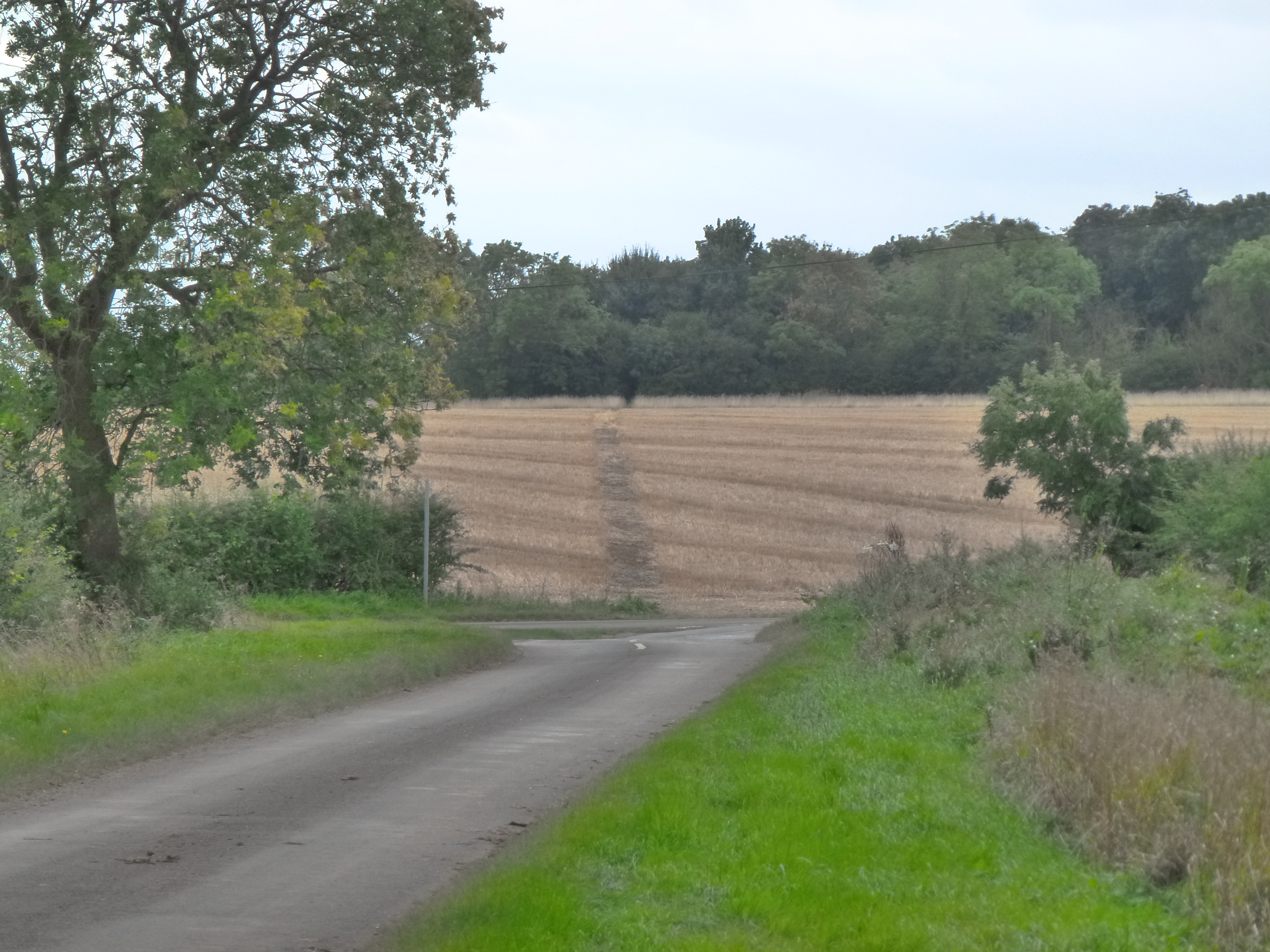
Roman Alignment through cornfield

== Route details ==
Point	Coordinates (Links to map resources)	OS Grid Ref	Notes
Footpath to Cawthorpe	52.78136°N 0.37688°W	TF095216	King street deviates from modern A15, to go through Stainfield to Ancaster. Start of Roman Mareham Lane
Old Beck culvert	52.833°N 0.382338°W	TF090273	Bottom of Windmill Hill, Rippingale. Start of linear Roman alignment on OS map
Layby at Graby	52.84589°N 0.379076°W	TF092288	Modern A15 straightened in the late 20th century. Roman alignment continues into lay-by
Footpath to Graby Lane	52.8479°N 0.37839°W	TF093290	Roman alignment continues across field as public footpath
Graby Lane	52.85179°N 0.376201°W	TF094294	End of footpath. Start of Modern Mareham Lane
Ford	52.85909°N 0.375624°W	TF094303	
Dry Ford	52.891069°N 0.375180°W	TF094338	Seasonally intermittent Stream, sometimes appears across road. Stream flows into Ouse Mere Lode
Billingborough crossroads	52.89308°N 0.37610°W	TF093340	Billingborough road, Folkingham; Folkingham road, Billingborough.
Stow Green	52.902246°N 0.374673°W	TF094351	Site of Stow Fair. Site of Anglo-Saxon nunnery.
Threekinghham crossroads	52.914059°N 0.377324°W	TF092364	Modern A52 crosses Modern Mareham Lane.
Mareham House	52.92864°N 0.379285°W	TF090380	Road junction at Spanby
Bend	52.980883°N 0.387184°W	TF083438	Northern end of Roman alignment on OS map. Modern road deviates, and Roman Alignment becomes unclear.
Corner	52.989179°N 0.391002°W	TF081447	Modern Mareham road turns left. This different alignment continues toward the old ford at Sleaford as a footpath.
Parish boundary	52.992037°N 0.392937°W	TF079450	Modified alignment continues past modern Mareham Lane as parish boundary Public footpath alongside.
Sleaford level crossing	52.995258°N 0.408493°W	TF069453	End of modern road called Mareham Lane at Sleaford level crossing.
cropmark	52.984625°N 0.386017°W	TF084442	Possible continuation of straight alignment after the bend
cropmark	52.997205°N 0.385548°W	TF084456	Well-founded discovery of Roman road not on expected alignment.
Ruskington	53.037701°N 0.388510°W	TF081501	Well-founded discovery of Roman road to south of Ruskington, on public footpath. Speculative northern continuation from Sleaford to Lincoln

== See also ==
- High Dyke, Lincolnshire
- King Street (Roman road) Water Newton to Bourne to Ancaster, Margary number RR26
