= RAF Kelstern =

Former RAF station in Lincolnshire, England

RAF Kelstern
- Kelstern, Lincolnshire in England

Site information
- Type: Royal Air Force satellite station 12 Base substation
- Code: KS
- Owner: Air Ministry
- Operator: Royal Air Force
- Controlled by: RAF Bomber Command * No. 1 Group RAF

Location
- Shown within Lincolnshire RAF Kelstern (the United Kingdom)
- Coordinates: 53°24′36″N 000°06′54″W

Site history
- Built: 1917 & 1942/3
- In use: 1917 - 19; September 1943 - May 1945
- Battles/wars: European theatre of World War II

Airfield information
- Elevation: 126 metres (413 ft) AMSL
Runways
Direction	Length and surface
00/00	Concrete/Asphalt
00/00	Concrete/Asphalt
00/00	Concrete/Asphalt

Royal Air Force Kelstern or RAF Kelstern is a former Royal Air Force satellite station 3.6 miles (5.8 km) south east of Binbrook, Lincolnshire and 4.9 miles (7.9 km) north west of Louth, Lincolnshire, England.

== Station history ==
The airfield first opened in 1917 as a night landing ground before closing in 1919.

RAF Kelstern re-opened in 1943 and the following squadrons used the airfield:

- No. 33 Squadron RAF.
- No. 170 Squadron RAF reformed at the airfield on 15 October 1944 with the Avro Lancaster I and III before moving to RAF Dunholme Lodge on 22 October 1944.
- No. 625 Squadron RAF reformed at Kelstern on 1 October 1943 with the Lancaster I and III before moving to RAF Scampton on 5 April 1945, where the squadron disbanded on 14 October 1945.

== See also ==
- List of former Royal Air Force stations
