= Battle Order 204 =

- Book cover
- Author: Christobel Mattingley
- Language: English
- Genre: Young adult non fiction
- Published: 1 September 2007 (Allen & Unwin)
- Publication place: Australia
- Media type: Paperback – B Format
- Pages: 324
- ISBN: 9781741751611

Battle Order 204 is a historical, non-fiction novel that recounts the experiences of David Mattingley a bomber pilot of the Royal Australian Air Force serving with No. 625 Squadron RAF. It follows Mattingley's dream to one day be a pilot and his journey from start to finish into the skies of Europe during the second world war.

The book is centered on the mission in which his Arvo Lancaster- after being struck three times shattering his hand and badly wounding his leg- was safely returned to the airfield in which it had launched from beating the crews proposal to abandon the wrecked aircraft, for which he was awarded the Distinguished Flying Cross.

The book contains photographs, logs and other images of Mattingley's experiences throughout his service. The rear cover features Lincoln Cathedral which Mattingley had visited whilst stationed at RAF Kelstern and the royalties from the sale of this book are donated to the Association of the Friends of Lincoln Cathedral.

It was released on 1 September 2007 under the publisher Allen & Unwin at a ceremony organized by the Friends of Lincoln Cathedral in Lincoln Cathedral and attended by the Australian High Commissioner, the Rt. Hon. Baroness Willoughby de Eresby, the Lord Lieutenant of Lincolnshire and the Dean of the cathedral.

At this ceremony, Mattingley laid a wreath at the ledger stone commemorating the 55,000 men of Bomber Command who lost their lives.
