= Brookenby Church =

Coordinates: 53.441°N 0.190°W

- St. Michael and All Angels Church, Brookenby
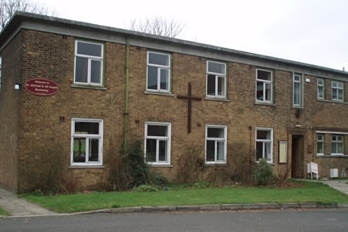
- Brookenby Church
- OS grid reference: TF 20141 95371
- Location: Brookenby, Lincolnshire
- Country: England
- Denomination: Church of England
- Churchmanship: Broad Church

History
- Dedication: Saint Michael

Architecture
- Functional status: Active

Administration
- Province: Canterbury
- Diocese: Lincoln
- Parish: Walesby

Clergy
- Rector: John Carr

Brookenby Church is located in Brookenby, Lincolnshire, England. A member of the Church of England, it forms part of the Walesby group of churches, which also includes churches in Claxby, Kirmond le Mire, Normanby le Wold, North Willingham, Stainton le Vale, Tealby and Walesby. This group of Churches is within the Diocese of Lincoln. Dedicated to the archangel Saint Michael, Brookenby church was established in the 1990s and is housed in the West wing of a former Officers Mess building.

Following the closure of RAF Binbrook, the building was converted to a community centre to serve the newly formed village of Brookenby.
