= David Mattingley =

David Mattingley DFC
- Born: 14 June 1922; Tasmania
- Died: 2 June 2017 (aged 94)
- Years active: 1942-1946
- Spouse: Christobel Mattingley
- Children: 3
- Awards: Distinguished Flying Cross

David Mattingley, DFC (14 June 1922 – 2 June 2017) was an Australian bomber pilot who flew for the Royal Australian Air Force in the British No. 625 Squadron during World War II in which he received the Distinguished Flying Cross.

== Early life ==
David Mattingley was born in Tasmania in 1922.

== Career ==
At age 19, he was accepted into the Royal Australian Air Force. Because of the high casualty rate in Bomber Command, he underwent training on heavy aircraft. He was then posted to RAF 625 Squadron at Kelstern, Lincolnshire.

=== Distinguished Flying Cross ===
On his 23rd operation on November 29, 1944, Mattingley and his crew took off in Lancaster D DOG for a daytime raid on Dortmund as part of a force of some 300 aircraft.

After bombing the target successfully they turned for home and met very intensive flak. Although Mattingley was hit in the head by shrapnel which fractured his skull and severed tendons in his right hand, he continued to fly on. A little later flak caught them twice more and he was wounded in the right knee and later in the right shoulder, rendering his arm useless.

Eventually, having crossed the coast, he offered the crew the chance to bail out over England. They refused, so he called base to have fire engines and an ambulance ready for their landing. He did not mention they were required for him. With some assistance on the throttles from his English flight engineer, Cyril Bailey, he put the severely damaged aircraft down in a copybook landing. He received an immediate award of the DFC, and Cyril, who was also wounded, received the DFM.

He was honoured in The London Gazette on 26 January 1945:

As pilot and captain of aircraft, Flying Officer Mattingley took part in a raid against Dortmund in November 1944. Whilst over the target the aircraft was badly hit. Flying Officer Mattingley was wounded about the head and in the arm and thigh. In spite of this he carried through with his attack and afterwards flew the damaged aircraft back to this country. His indomitable spirit, superb captaincy and outstanding devotion to duty set an example of a high order.

=== Recovery ===
Mattingley spent the next four months in Rauceby Hospital and Loughborough.

In September 1945, while awaiting repatriation he was diagnosed with severe pleurisy which developed into tuberculosis, hospitalising him for a further five months before being returned by hospital ship to Australia, where he had three more hospital stays. Altogether he had spent three years in hospital as a result of his wartime experiences.

== Personal life ==
After the war, Mattingley taught at one of Adelaide's exclusive boys' schools, Prince Alfred College. He married the now Christobel Mattingley who published his experiences in Battle Order 204, bore three children, two sons and a daughter.
