= Australia and the Empire Air Training Scheme =

Program to train Australian pilots during World War II

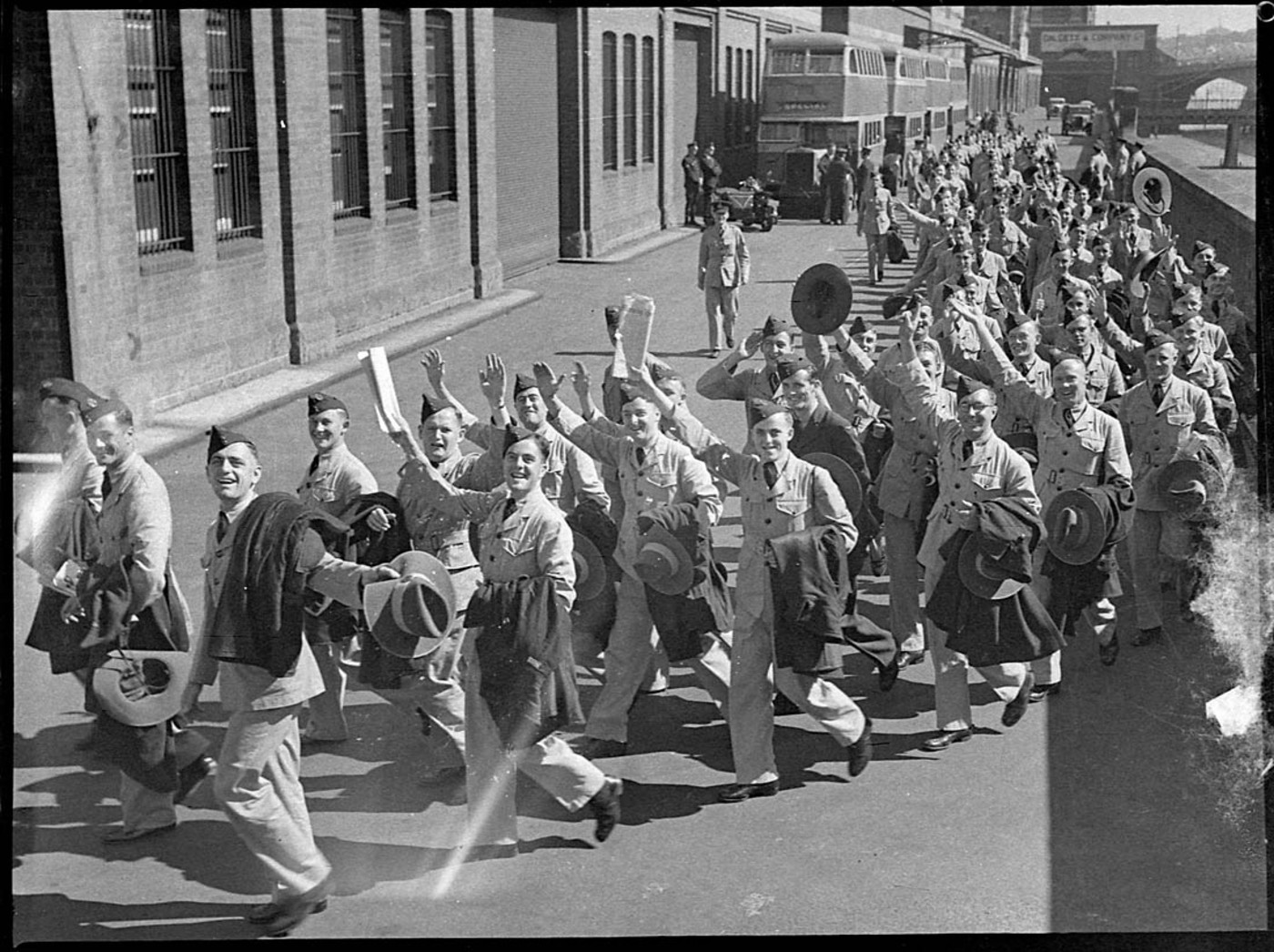
Aircrew trained in Australia under the Empire Air Training Scheme depart for Britain before transfer to the RAF.

The Empire Air Training Scheme (EATS) was a policy designed to train Royal Australian Air Force pilots for eventual transfer into the Royal Air Force during World War II. The policy, dubbed the Empire Air Training Scheme in Australia, was envisioned after the British Empire was unable to supply enough pilots and aircraft for the Royal Air force. In Australia the scheme would eventually branch out and provide the training of pilots for deployment in the Pacific War.

== Background ==
In the period of rearmament preceding World War II, the Royal Air Force estimated that they would need to acquire 50,000 new pilots annually in order to keep the RAF sufficiently supplied. While planners were confident that the industrial capacity of the British Empire would be capable of producing a sufficient number of planes, it became clear that there was a shortage of able fliers. As the War in Europe drew closer, it was estimated Britain could muster only 22,000 pilots annually.

In response to this shortage, the British government instituted a plan to levy pilots from the dominions referred to as the British Commonwealth Air Training Plan. The plan called for an establishment of a pool of recruits in the dominions from which the RAF could siphon replacement pilots. The government of Australia accepted the plan for three years and began making preparations to adopt it. Under the plan, dubbed the Empire Air Scheme in Australia, 50,000 aircrew would be trained in the dominions.

Australia planned to provide 28,000 aircrew under the scheme, accounting for 36% of the total number of proposed aircrew. Basic flying courses officially began 29 April 1940. The first Australian pilots departed for Canada on 14 November 1940, from where they would be transferred to Britain and funneled into the RAF.

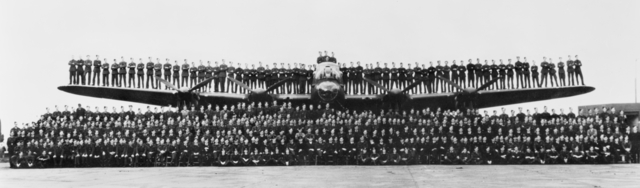
Formal portrait of members of No. 460 Squadron RAAF, commanded by Wing Commander C. E. Martin, in front of and lined up on the wing of Lancaster Bomber 'G for George'. Many of these aircrew were trained under EATS.

== Empire Air Training Scheme ==
Following the signing of the plan, a massive construction and recruitment campaign was launched to increase the number of Australian pilots. The "Scheme" would ultimately cost Australia about £100,000,000 for her commitments. The RAAF built air and ground training schools, airfields, and specialized flying academies. While original designed only to train aircrew, the Australian government soon modified the scheme to compensate for the unique situation Australia found itself in. In addition to the Empire Air Training Scheme, wartime demands and restrictions led to shortages as funds and resources were needed for home defence. When German Strategic Bombing of British factories reduced the number of serviceable aircraft in Britain, the Australian government appropriated funds from EATS to establish the Department of Aircraft Production, the precursor to Government Aircraft Factories.

Following the opening of the Pacific War in 1941, the number of Australian aircrews being transferred to the European theatre greatly decreased as the RAAF prepared to counter the armed forces of the Empire of Japan. A series of Japanese air raids greatly increased the need for a large force of combat ready pilots and aircraft in Australia.

=== Schools established by EATS ===
Outdoor group portrait of the RAAF soccer team from the No 4 Initial Training School, Victor Harbor, South Australia 1941.

The following types of schools were established as part of EATS:

- Initial Training
- Elementary Flying Training
- Service Flying Training
- Air Navigation
- Air Observer
- Bombing and Gunnery
- Wireless Air Gunnery

A memorial was dedicated to 5 Service Flying Training School RAAF, within the Empire Air Training Scheme at Uranquinty, 19 September 1999.
