= Calcethorpe with Kelstern =

Civil parish in Lincolnshire, England

Coordinates: 53.394°N 0.11°W

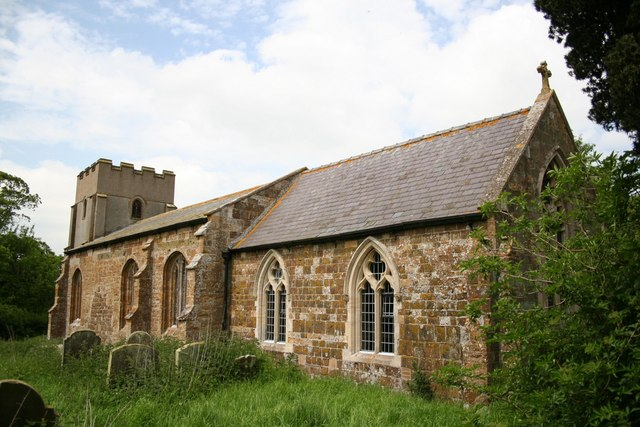
- St Faith's church, Kelstern

- Location within Lincolnshire
- OS grid reference: TF252903
  - London: 130 mi (210 km) S
- Civil parish: Calcethorpe with Kelstern
- Unitary authority: East Lindsey
- Ceremonial county: Lincolnshire
- Region: East Midlands
- Country: England
- Sovereign state: United Kingdom
- Post town: Louth
- Postcode district: LN11
- Police: Lincolnshire
- Fire: Lincolnshire
- Ambulance: East Midlands
- UK Parliament: Louth and Horncastle (UK Parliament constituency)

Calcethorpe with Kelstern is a civil parish in the East Lindsey district of Lincolnshire, England. It is situated west from the market town of Louth, and in the Lincolnshire Wolds, an Area of Outstanding Natural Beauty.

The parish includes the hamlets of Calcethorpe to the south of Kelstern, and Lambcroft to the north. The Kelstern with Calcethorpe parish is now incorporated into the larger grouping of the Binbrook Group of Parishes.

Calcethorpe church was dedicated to Saint Faith but had disappeared by about 1450.

Kelstern Grade II listed parish church is also dedicated to St Faith and is Early English in origin, but was restored in 1886.
