= G for George =

Preserved Avro Lancaster bomber aircraft

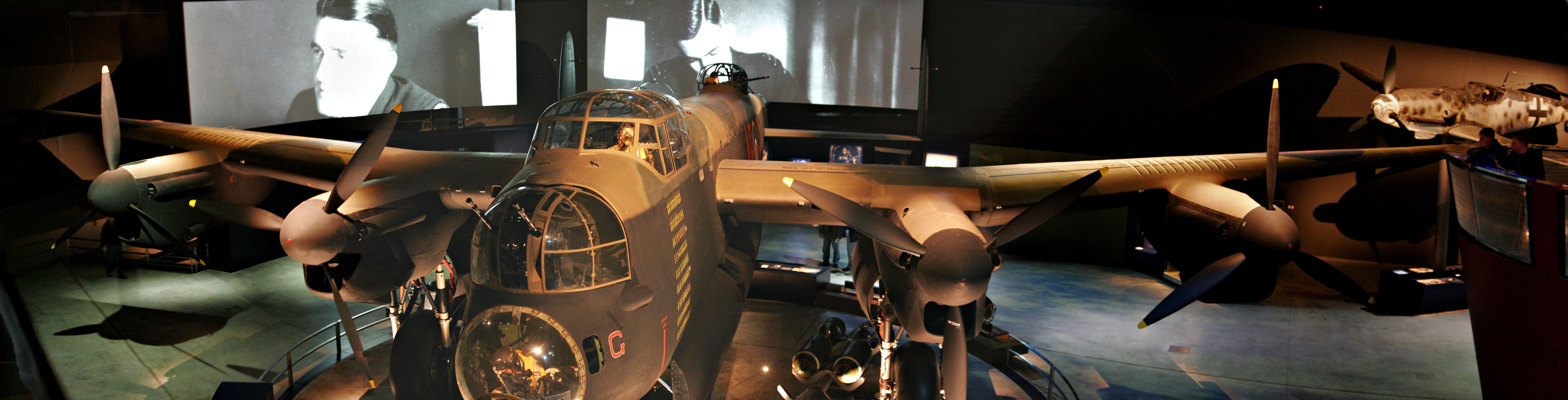
G for George on display at the Australian War Memorial, Canberra

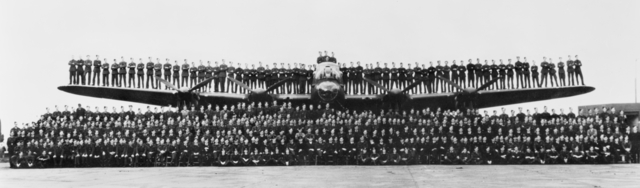
Members of 460 Squadron RAAF with G for George in August 1943

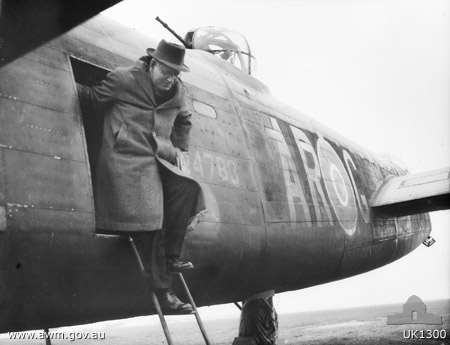
Prime Minister John Curtin exiting G for George during his visit to Britain in 1944

G for George is an Avro Lancaster Mk. I bomber, squadron code AR-G and serial number W4783, operated by No. 460 Squadron RAAF during World War II. It is now preserved at the Australian War Memorial (AWM), Canberra, Australia.

== History ==
G-George flew 90 operational sorties over occupied Europe with 460 Squadron, and is the second most prolific surviving Lancaster, behind R5868 S for Sugar of No. 83 Squadron RAF/No. 463 Squadron RAAF/No. 467 Squadron RAAF (137 sorties). Most operational Lancasters were shot down before they had reached 20 sorties: of the 107,085 sorties by Lancasters despatched in bombing raids on Germany 2,687 aircraft went missing. G-George has the added distinction of bringing home, alive, every crewman who flew aboard it.

Upon retirement from combat duty in 1944, G-George was flown to Australia by an all-RAAF crew of Bomber Command veterans, and played a major part in raising war bonds during a round-Australia publicity trip. Post-war, it was left to decay in the open air at RAAF Base Fairbairn, before being moved to the AWM in the early 1950s.

In 2003, G-George returned to display at the AWM in the new ANZAC Hall after a five-year restoration program at the Treloar Technology Centre, which restored the aircraft as faithfully as possible to its wartime configuration. It is displayed in conjunction with a sound and light show that attempts to convey something of the atmosphere of a World War II Bomber Command raid, and incorporates a German '88' flak gun and a Bf 109 fighter. The display is based on a sortie captained by Flying Officer "Cherry" Carter to Berlin on "Black Thursday" December 1943, so called because Bomber Command lost 50 of the 500 bombers detailed for the raid - more than half were lost in landing accidents due to bad weather.

G-George serves as a memorial to all Australians who flew with Bomber Command, and to the 1,018 dead of 460 Squadron.

The designation 'G-George' comes from the RAF phonetic alphabet in use at the time. Individual aircraft of a squadron were allocated a letter and would be referred to using the corresponding word from the phonetic alphabet. This identification letter ('G') would be painted on the side of the aircraft in conjunction with the two-letter squadron code, in this case 'AR-G'. Many other RAF squadrons would also have had their own 'G-George', but allied to a different squadron code such as Spitfire 'XE-G' belonging to No. 123 squadron RAF.

== See also ==
- RAF Museum, Hendon - home to Lancaster "S for Sugar"
