= Brookenby =

Village and civil parish in the West Lindsey district of Lincolnshire, England

Coordinates: 53.442570°N 0.192780°W

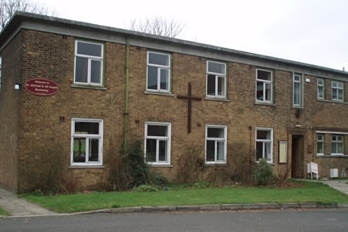
- Brookenby Church

- Location within Lincolnshire
- Population: 665 (2011 census)
- OS grid reference: TF201954
  - London: 130 mi (210 km) S
- District: West Lindsey
- Shire county: Lincolnshire
- Region: East Midlands
- Country: England
- Sovereign state: United Kingdom
- Post town: Market Rasen
- Postcode district: LN8
- Police: Lincolnshire
- Fire: Lincolnshire
- Ambulance: East Midlands
- UK Parliament: Gainsborough

Brookenby is a village and civil parish in the West Lindsey district of Lincolnshire, England. The village is situated 7 miles (11 km) north-east from Market Rasen. According to the 2001 census, it had a population of 742, falling to 665 at the 2011 census but recovering to 705 in the 2021 census.

The village developed around the former RAF station, RAF Binbrook, with most of the population living in the former RAF housing. Since the name of the station came from an existing nearby village, the name 'Brookenby' was chosen in the 1980s when the new village was constituted. The name is believed to be derived from a nearby abandoned or plague village.

The former sergeants' mess is now Brookenby Church, part of the Walesby group of parishes. A Trading Estate was developed on the remains of the RAF station in 1998.

The consistent 1940s period architecture led to the use of RAF Binbrook for scenes in the 1990 re-make of Memphis Belle.

== See also ==
- Lincolnshire Wolds
- Binbrook
