= Kelstern =

Village in Lincolnshire, England

Coordinates: 53.394855°N 0.117945°W

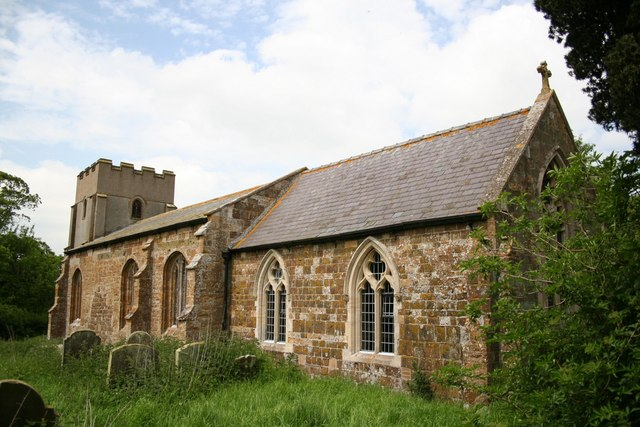
- St Faith’s Church, Kelstern

- Location within Lincolnshire
- OS grid reference: TF252903
  - London: 135 mi (217 km) S
- Civil parish: Calcethorpe with Kelstern
- District: East Lindsey
- Shire county: Lincolnshire
- Region: East Midlands
- Country: England
- Sovereign state: United Kingdom
- Post town: Louth
- Postcode district: LN11
- Police: Lincolnshire
- Fire: Lincolnshire
- Ambulance: East Midlands
- UK Parliament: Louth and Horncastle (UK Parliament constituency)

Kelstern is a village in the civil parish of Calcethorpe with Kelstern, in the East Lindsey district of Lincolnshire, England.

The village is north from the A631 road, 5 miles (8.0 km) north-west from Louth and 4 miles (6 km) south-east from Binbrook. Calcethorpe with Kelstern parish also includes the hamlets of Calcethorpe to the south of Kelstern, and Lambcroft to the north.

In 1961 the parish had a population of 68. On 1 April 1987 the parish was abolished and merged with Calcethorpe to form "Calcethorpe with Kelstern".

In the Domesday Book of 1086, Kelstern is written as 'Cheilestorne'. The settlement was in the Hundred of Louthesk of the South Riding of Lindsey. It included 28.3 households, 0.5 ploughlands, and a meadow 8 acres (0.0 km^{2}). Klak was Lord of the manor in 1066, this transferred to Waldin the Artificer (or Engineer) in 1086, who was also Tenant-in-chief to king William I.

Kelstern is recorded in the 1872 White's Directory as a small village, and a parish with a population of 218 in an area of 2,700 acres (10.9 km^{2}) land, which included the hamlet of Lambcroft with a population of 56 in 800 acres (3.2 km^{2}). Kelstern parishioners paid no tithes or commuted rent charge payments to the church or rector, as the parish and manor was "anciently" the demesne of North Ormsby Abbey. The principal owner of parish land and lord of the manor was Lord Ossington (Evelyn Denison, 1st Viscount Ossington), who was also the impropriator and patron of the ecclesiastical parish living. St Faith's, a small church of nave, chancel and tower, had been partly rebuilt and re-roofed in 1831. Reported was two early 17th-century church monuments erected by Sir Francis South to each of his wives, died 1604 and 1620. The incumbency was a discharged vicarage – relief from the payment of annates, being the first year's parish revenues and one tenth of the income in all succeeding years – for a payment of £150 yearly, the vicar living at Binbrook. A school was built in 1861, paid for by the lord of the manor, and was attended by 30 children. The school was used for services by Wesleyans. Professions and trades of those listed as resident in 1872 included a parish clerk, a schoolmistress, a wheelwright, a blacksmith, two auctioneers & estate agents, a further auctioneer at Calcethorpe, and another at Cawkwell who was also a farmer. There were three further farmers, one of whom was at Lambcroft.

Kelstern Grade II listed parish church is dedicated to St Faith and is Early English in origin, but was restored in 1886. The Calcethorpe with Kelstern ecclesiastical parish is now incorporated into the larger grouping of the Binbrook Group of Parishes.

Calcethorpe, with South Cadeby, immediately to its south, is the site of lost medieval villages of the same names, managed by Defra to preserve wildlife.

To the east of the village are Bronze Age barrows.

In 1917 RAF Kelstern was established adjacent to the village as a First World War airfield, and in 1942 became the Second World War home to No. 625 Squadron RAF.
