= Calcethorpe =

Hamlet in Lincolnshire, England

Coordinates: 53.380460°N 0.124674°W

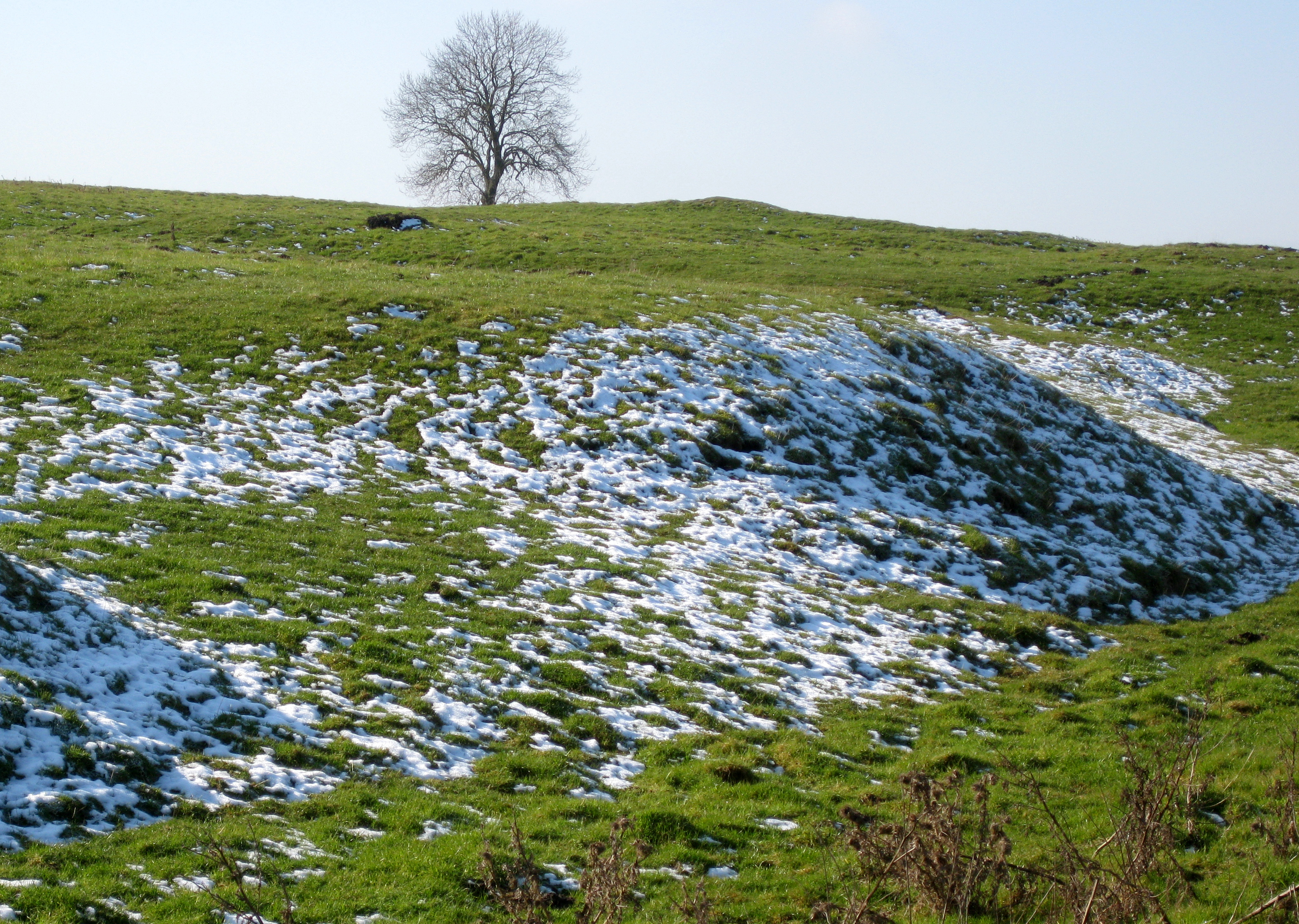
- Earthworks at Calcethorpe deserted medieval village

- Location within Lincolnshire
- Population: 70 (2001 census) (with Kelstern)
- OS grid reference: TF248887
  - London: 130 mi (210 km) S
- Civil parish: Calcethorpe with Kelstern
- District: East Lindsey
- Shire county: Lincolnshire
- Region: East Midlands
- Country: England
- Sovereign state: United Kingdom
- Post town: Louth
- Postcode district: LN11
- Police: Lincolnshire
- Fire: Lincolnshire
- Ambulance: East Midlands
- UK Parliament: Louth and Horncastle

Calcethorpe is a hamlet and deserted medieval village (DMV), in the civil parish of Calcethorpe with Kelstern, in the East Lindsey district of Lincolnshire, England. It is situated approximately 5 miles (8 km) west from the market town of Louth, and in the Lincolnshire Wolds, an Area of Outstanding Natural Beauty. In 1971 the parish had a population of 27. On 1 April 1987 the parish was abolished and merged with Kelstern to form "Calcethorpe with Kelstern".

Calcethorpe is recorded in the 1086 Domesday Book as having two households and six acres of meadow.

The church was dedicated to Saint Faith but had fallen into ruin and disappeared by about 1450, around the same time as the rest of the village was abandoned. The earthworks near Manor Farm are known locally as 'Priests Close' and are the probable site of the church.
