= British Commonwealth Air Training Plan =

Joint military aircrew training program during World War II

- Part of the Second World War
- Australia, Canada, New Zealand, United States
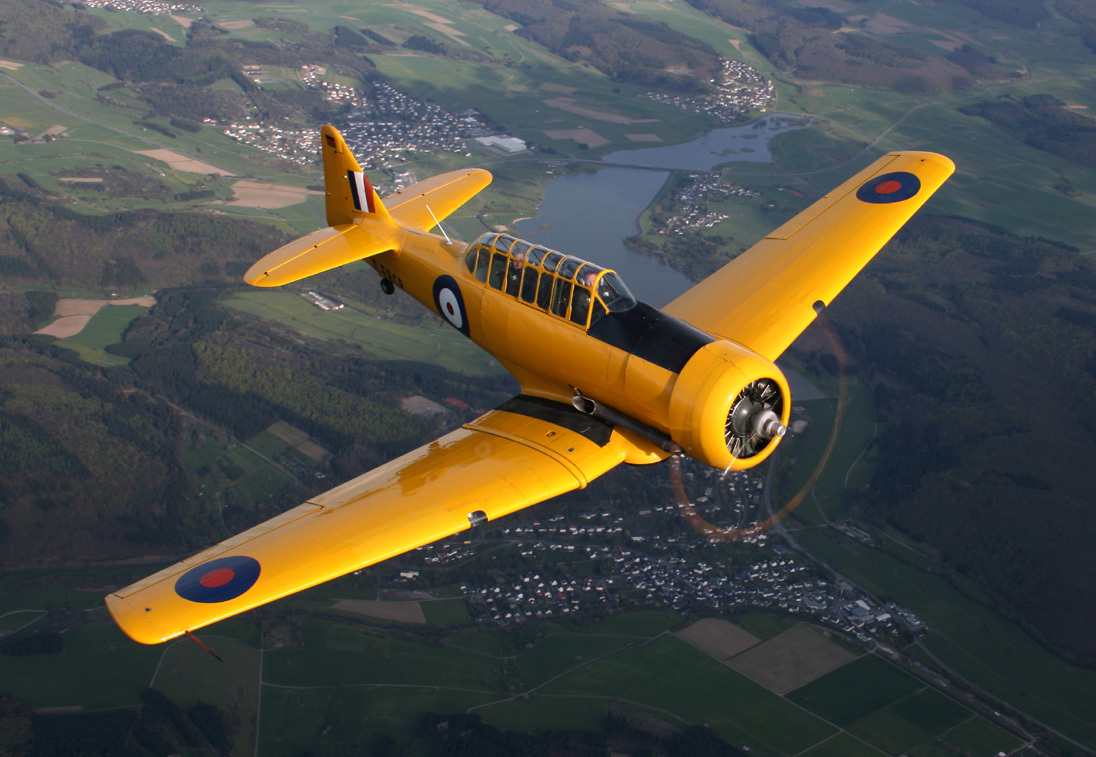
- RCAF Harvard

Site history
- In use: 1939–45

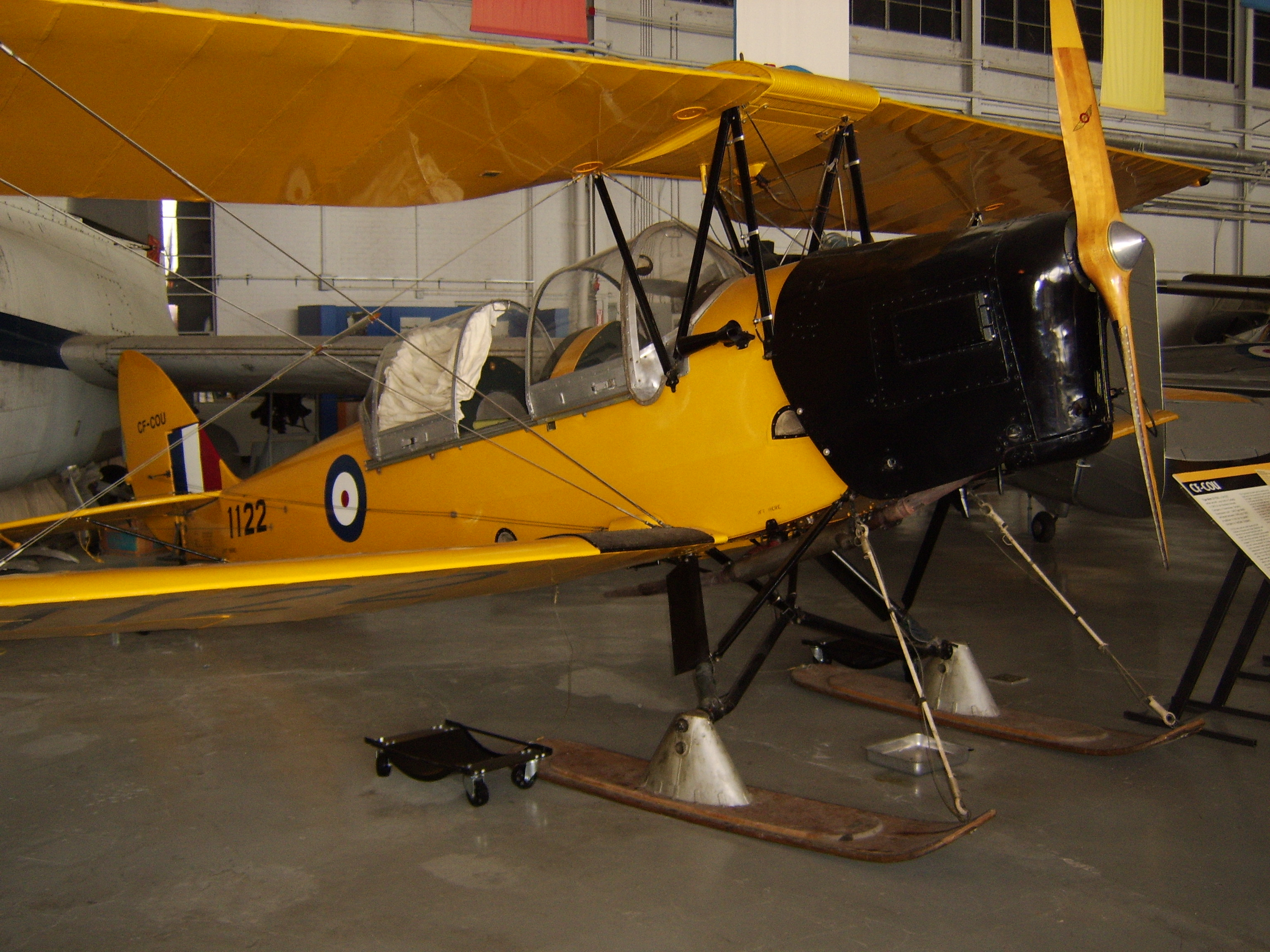
A de Havilland DH.82C Tiger Moth in British Commonwealth Air Training Plan "trainer yellow" at the Western Canada Aviation Museum (the skis and the enclosed cockpit were common to Canadian-built Tiger Moths)

The British Commonwealth Air Training Plan (BCATP), often referred to as simply "The Plan", was a large-scale multinational military aircrew training program created by the United Kingdom, Canada, Australia and New Zealand during the Second World War. The BCATP remains one of the single largest aviation training programs in history and was responsible for training nearly half the pilots, navigators, bomb aimers, air gunners, wireless operators and flight engineers who served with the Royal Air Force (RAF), Royal Navy Fleet Air Arm (FAA), Royal Australian Air Force (RAAF), Royal Canadian Air Force (RCAF) and Royal New Zealand Air Force (RNZAF) during the war.

Trainees from many other countries attended schools under the Plan, including Rhodesia, Argentina, Belgium, Ceylon, Czechoslovakia, Denmark, Finland, Fiji, Free France, Greece, the Netherlands, Newfoundland, Norway, Poland, and the United States.

Canada was chosen as the primary location for the BCATP's training operations.

== Relationship to other British aircrew training programs ==
The BCATP was one of many wartime training programs undertaken for and by the RAF and FAA. Such training occurred throughout the British Empire and Commonwealth and even extended into the United States.

In some texts, the name British Commonwealth Air Training Plan is erroneously used to denote these worldwide training efforts. The totality of British aircrew training efforts is correctly referred to as the Empire Air Training Scheme (EATS) or Joint Aircrew Training Program (JATP). The use of "British Commonwealth Air Training Plan" to denote the Canadian program and "Empire Air Training Scheme" to denote the totality of British worldwide aircrew training programs is consistent with the way these terms were used in the wartime London Times. Canadian Prime Minister King coined the expression "British Commonwealth Air Training Plan" to describe the BCATP in his speech of December 17, 1939. In the same speech, he refers to "joint training," "joint air training plan," American air training plans, and prewar British-Canadian air training programs.

== Genesis of the Plan and first steps ==
Negotiations regarding joint aircrew training between the four governments took place in Ottawa during the first few months of the war. The W.L.M. King government saw involvement in the BCATP as a means of keeping Canadians at home, but more importantly, it eased demands for a large expeditionary force and buried the politically divisive issue of overseas conscription. Negotiating the agreement was difficult. Canada agreed to accept most of the costs of the plan but in return insisted on a British pronouncement that air training would be Canada's primary war effort. Another sticking point was the British expectation that the RAF would absorb Canadian air training graduates without restrictions, as in the First World War, and distribute them across the RAF. King demanded that Canadian airmen be identified as members of the RCAF with distinct uniforms and shoulder badges. On 17 December 1939, the four nations concluded the Air Training Agreement – often called the "Riverdale Agreement", after the UK representative at the negotiations, Lord Riverdale.

The agreement stated that the training was to be styled after that of the RAF: three initial training schools, 13 elementary flying training schools, 16 service flying training schools, 10 air observer schools, 10 bombing and gunnery schools, two air navigation schools and four wireless schools were to be created.

The agreement called for the training of nearly 50,000 aircrew each year, for as long as necessary: 22,000 aircrew from Great Britain, 13,000 from Canada, 11,000 from Australia and 3,300 from New Zealand. Under the agreement, air crews received elementary training in their home country before travelling to Canada for advanced courses. Training costs were to be divided among the four governments.

Article XV of the agreement stipulated that graduates belonging to Dominion air forces, where they were assigned to service with the RAF, should be placed in new squadrons identified with the RAAF, RCAF and RNZAF. These units later became known as "Article XV squadrons". Articles XVI and XVII stipulated that the UK government would be wholly responsible for the pay and entitlements of graduates, once they were placed with RAF or Article XV units. Some pre-war/regular RAAF and RCAF squadrons also served under RAF operational control, while New Zealand and Rhodesian personnel were frequently assigned to RAF squadrons with the honorifics of "(NEW ZEALAND)" and "(RHODESIA)" in their names. However, in practice – and technically in contravention of Article XV – most personnel from other Commonwealth countries, while they were under RAF operational control, were assigned to British units. (Note: At the time of the Second World War, all persons born within the British Empire shared the same citizenship, that of being British subjects. Most of the Dominions and other territories did not award their own separate citizenship until after the war, in Canada's case 1946, with 1948 for Australia, and 1949 for New Zealand.)

On 29 April 1940, the first Canadian training course officially commenced, with 166 recruits, at No. 1 Initial Training School in Toronto. From this intake, 34 received their wings as pilots on 5 November 1940 and remained in Canada to serve in the BCATP as instructors or staff pilots. The first BCATP graduates sent to the United Kingdom were 37 Canadian observers, who received their wings at RCAF Trenton on 26 October 1940. The first BCATP-trained pilots posted overseas as a group were 37 RAAF personnel who graduated on 22 November 1940 from No. 2 Service Flying Training School. (Note: Douglas gives a detailed discussion of the negotiations in Ottawa on pp. 208-219.)

== Canadian operations ==
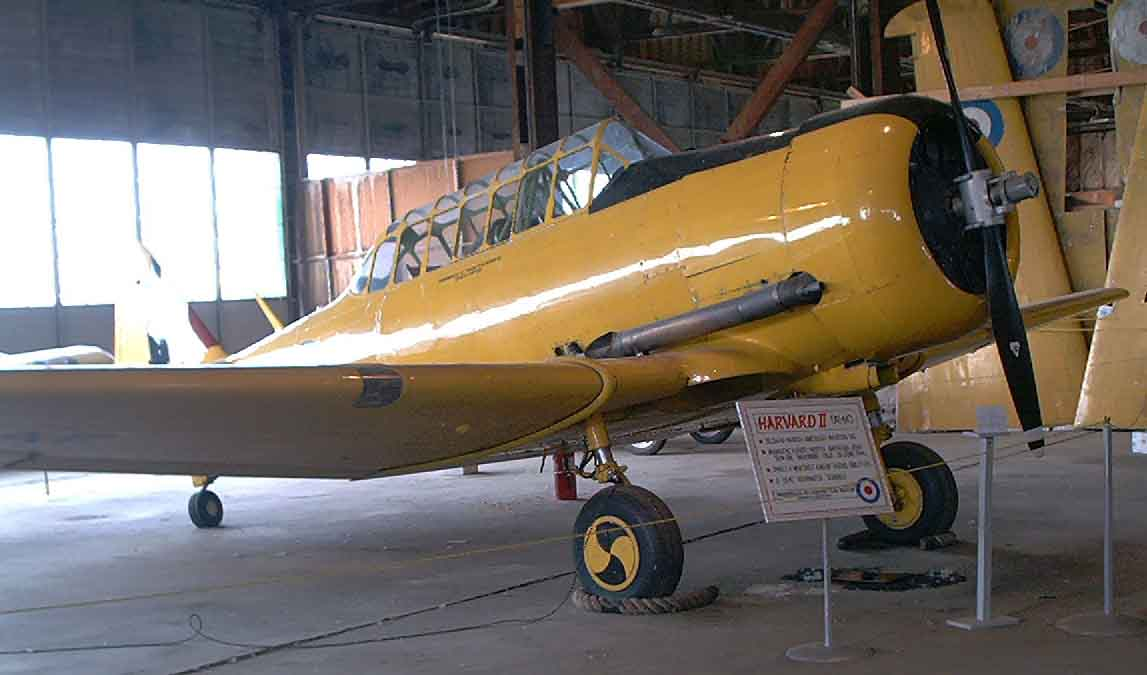
RCAF Harvards were used as a trainer aircraft by thousands of Commonwealth aviators from 1940 onwards. Harvard II from the BCATP Museum in Brandon, Manitoba, Canada.

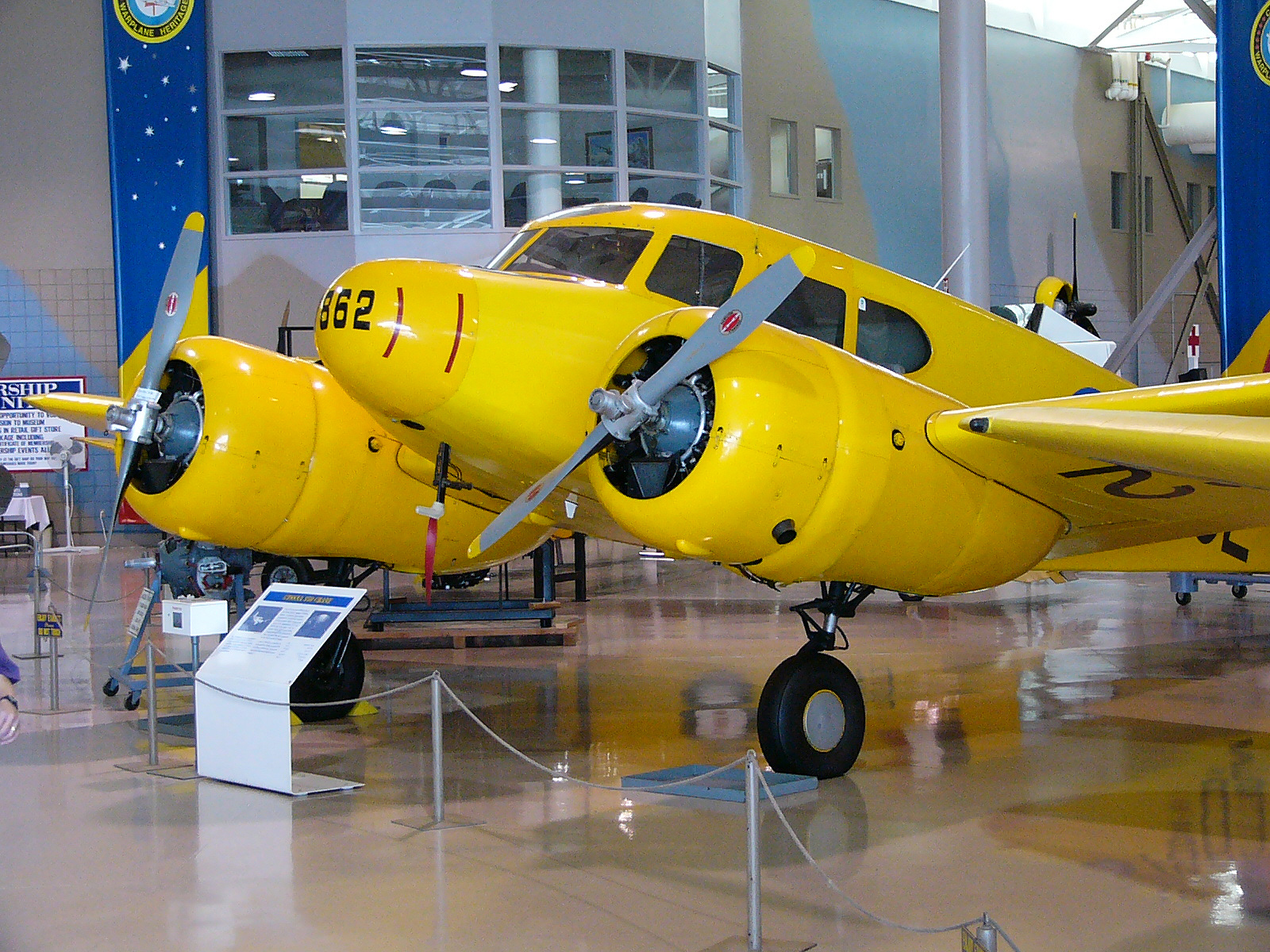
RCAF Cessna Crane as employed in the BCATP on display at the Canadian Warplane Heritage Museum

Canada was chosen as the primary location for "The Plan" because of its suitable weather; wide open spaces ideal for extensive flight and navigation training; closeness to the United States' industrial centres and supplies of fuel; the lack of any threat from enemy aircraft; and its proximity to the European theatre of war.

The RCAF ran the plan in Canada, but to satisfy RAF concerns, Robert Leckie, a senior RAF commander (at the time in charge of RAF squadrons in Malta) and a Canadian, was posted to Ottawa as Director of Training. From 1940 he directed BCATP training. (Note: Captains of the Clouds, a 1942 Warner Bros. war film starring James Cagney, the first feature length Hollywood production filmed entirely in Canada, proved to be an effective propaganda tool for both Canada and the United States as well as a playing a part in recruiting. The title of the film came from a phrase uttered at a BCATP Wings Parade by Air Marshall W.A.(Billy) Bishop, the First World War fighter ace, who played himself in the film.)

A wide range of American and British aircraft designs were used. Pilots might have done their initial flight training on the Canadian-produced examples of the British Tiger Moth, the American Boeing Stearman, or the Canadian designed and built Fleet Finch biplane.

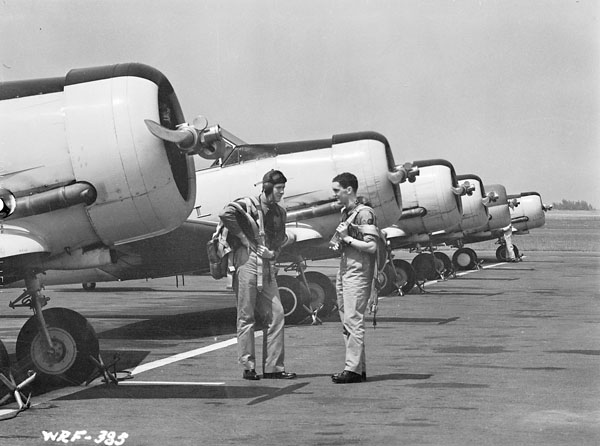
Instructor and student with North American Harvard II aircraft of No.2 Service Flying Training School, RCAF Station Uplands, Canada, 1941

At the plan's peak of activity in late 1943, the BCATP comprised over 100,000 administrative personnel operating 107 schools and 184 other supporting units at 231 locations all across Canada.

Infrastructure development including erecting "some 8,300 buildings of which 700 were hangars or of hangar-type construction." Fuel storage totalling more than 26 million imperial gallons (120,000 m^{3}) was installed along with 300 miles (480 km) of water mains and a similar length of sewer mains laid, involving 2,000,000 cubic yards (1,500,000 m^{3}) of excavation. A total of 100 sewage treatment and disposal plants and 120 water pumping stations were completed; and more than 2,000 miles (3,200 km) of main power lines and 535 miles (861 km) of underground electrical cable placed, servicing a total connected electrical power load of over 80,700 horsepower (60.2 MW).

In early 1944, the Air Ministry announced the winding-up of the plan, since the Commonwealth air forces had developed a surplus of air crews. The program terminated on March 31, 1945; by then, 131,553 trainees, including 49,808 pilots, had graduated. Over half (72,835) of the graduates were Canadians. The majority of the graduates served in the RAF.

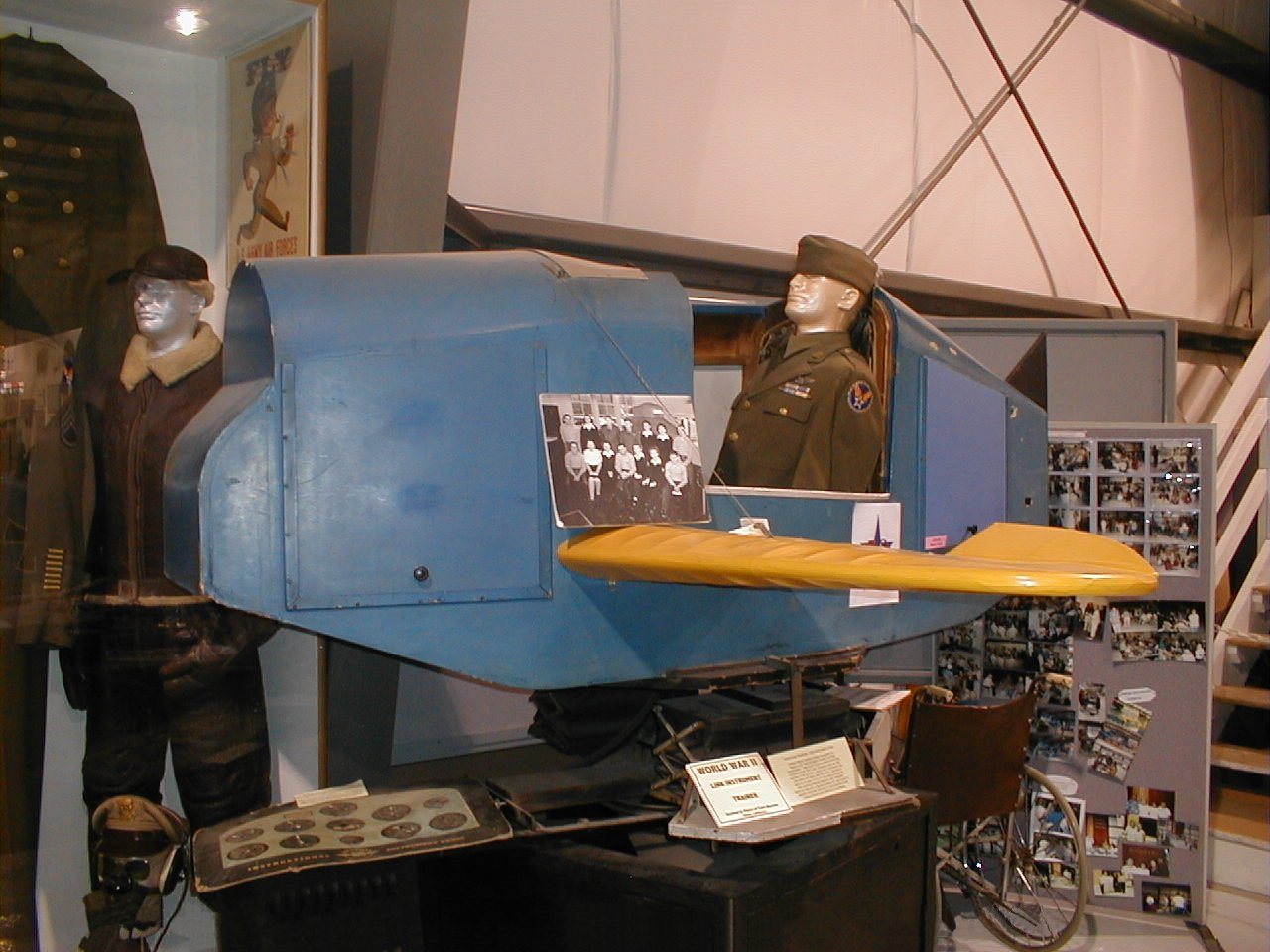
The American Link Trainer flight simulator was used as a key pilot training aid in the BCATP.

=== Assistance by the United States ===
By mid-1940, Canadian flying instructors were in extremely short supply and the RCAF began to recruit American pilots to fill this role. Air Marshal W.A. Bishop was instrumental in setting up a clandestine recruiting organization in the then still-neutral United States. In addition, other Americans began crossing the border to enlist at RCAF recruiting centres. In the spring of 1941, President Roosevelt stated that Americans could accept employment and volunteer for service with the British Commonwealth. After Pearl Harbor, RCAF recruiting in the United States was suspended and 1,759 American members of the RCAF transferred to the armed forces of the United States. Later on, another 2,000 transferred to US forces while 5,000 or so completed their service with the RCAF.

American assistance also included financial support that enabled the Canadian government to purchase aircraft, aircraft engines and other equipment for the BCATP in the US while maintaining an adequate supply of US dollars.

=== Host to the Royal Norwegian Air Force training program ===
In 1940, refugee Norwegian airmen established an aircrew training school in Toronto called Little Norway. It was similar to an Elementary Flying Training School in the BCATP. Graduates of Little Norway received advanced training in BCATP schools.

=== Host to independent Royal Air Force training units ===
In 1940, the RAF began to move aircrew training schools from the United Kingdom to Canada. The schools were run by the RAF independently of the RCAF's BCATP operations. Twenty-six RAF independent aircrew training schools were set up in Canada, plus No. 31 RDF (Radio Direction Finding) School and No. 31 Personnel Depot. In the summer of 1942, these RAF units were folded into the BCATP as part of the renegotiation and reorganization of the Plan.

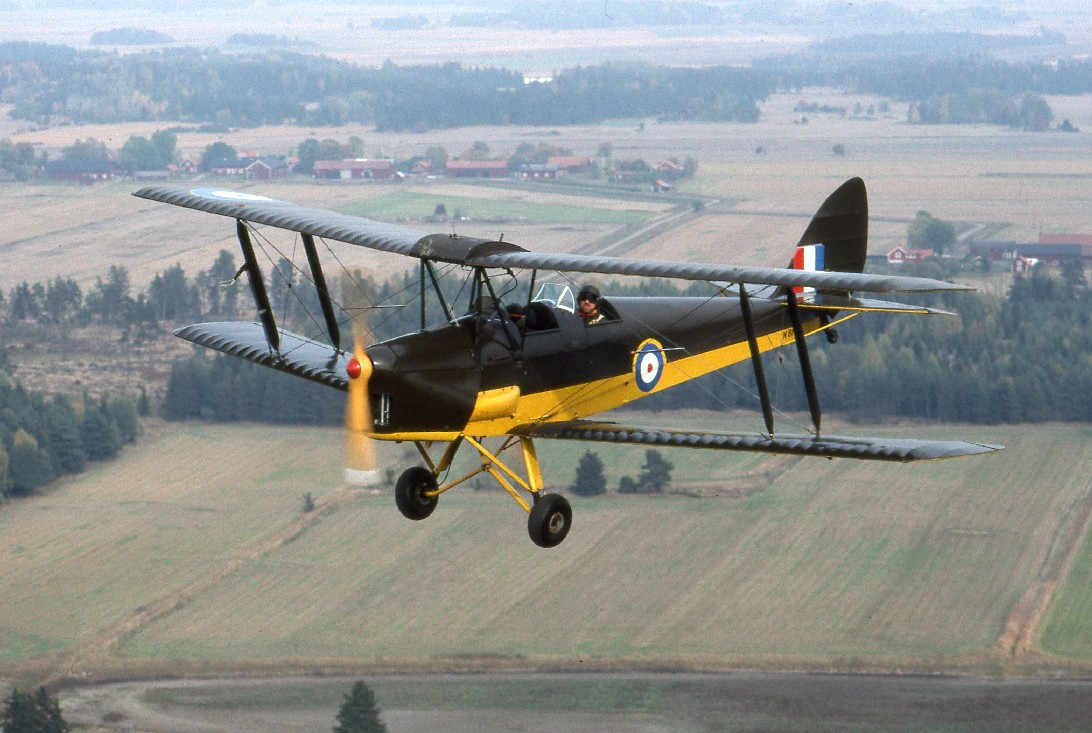
The ubiquitous DH 82 Tiger Moth, shown here in camouflaged upper surfaces, yellow lower surfaces, denoting a UK-based aircraft, was in use by all Commonwealth training units. In other BCATP areas the camouflage was dispensed with.

== Australia's role ==
The British Commonwealth Air Training Plan is referred to as the Empire Air Training Scheme in Australia.

Prior to the war, the RAAF trained only about 50 pilots per year. Under the BCATP, Australia undertook to provide 28,000 aircrew over three years, representing 36% of the total number trained by the BCATP. (Note: While its Canadian counterpart, at its peak strength (in 1944) was the larger of the two air forces, the RAAF overtook the RCAF towards the war's end to become the world's fourth largest air force.) By 1945, more than 37,500 Australian aircrew had been trained in Australia; a majority of these, over 27,300, had also graduated from schools in Australia.

During 1940, Royal Australian Air Force (RAAF) schools were established across Australia to support EATS in Initial Training, Elementary Flying Training, Service Flying Training, Air Navigation, Air Observer, Bombing and Gunnery and Wireless Air Gunnery. The first flying course started on 29 April 1940. Keith Chisholm (who later became an ace and served with No. 452 Squadron RAAF over Europe and the Pacific) was the first Australian to be trained under EATS.

For a period, most RAAF aircrews received advanced training in Canada. During mid-1940, however, some RAAF trainees began to receive advanced training at RAF facilities in Southern Rhodesia.

On 14 November 1940, the first contingent to graduate from advanced training in Canada embarked for Britain.

Following the outbreak of the Pacific War in December 1941, the majority of RAAF aircrews completed their training in Australia and served with RAAF units in the South West Pacific Theatre. In addition, an increasing number of Australian personnel were transferred from Europe and the Mediterranean to RAF squadrons in the South East Asian Theatre. Some Article XV squadrons were also transferred to RAAF or RAF formations involved in the Pacific War. Nevertheless, a significant proportion of RAAF personnel remained in Europe and RAAF Article XV squadrons continued to be formed there.

By early 1944, the flow of RAAF replacement personnel to Europe had begun to outstrip demand, and, following a request by the British government, was wound back significantly. Australian involvement was effectively terminated in October 1944.

== New Zealand's role ==
During the war, the RNZAF contributed 2,743 fully trained pilots to serve with the RAF in Europe, the Middle East, and Far East. Another 1,521 pilots who completed their training in New Zealand were retained in country; either as instructors, staff pilots, or manning operational squadrons formed during the latter half of the war. In 1940, before the British Commonwealth Air Training Plan was fully developed, New Zealand also trained 183 observers and 395 air gunners for the RAF. From 1943 onwards, the training of wireless operator/air gunners, and navigators was carried on in New Zealand for Pacific operations. In addition, some 2,910 pilots were trained to elementary standards and sent to Canada to continue their training. More than 2,700 wireless operator/air-gunners, 1,800 navigators, and 500 bombardiers passed through the Initial Training Wing before proceeding to Canada. Of the 131,000 trainees who graduated in Canada under the British Commonwealth Air Training Plan, New Zealanders formed 5.3%.

== Legacy ==
=== Canada ===
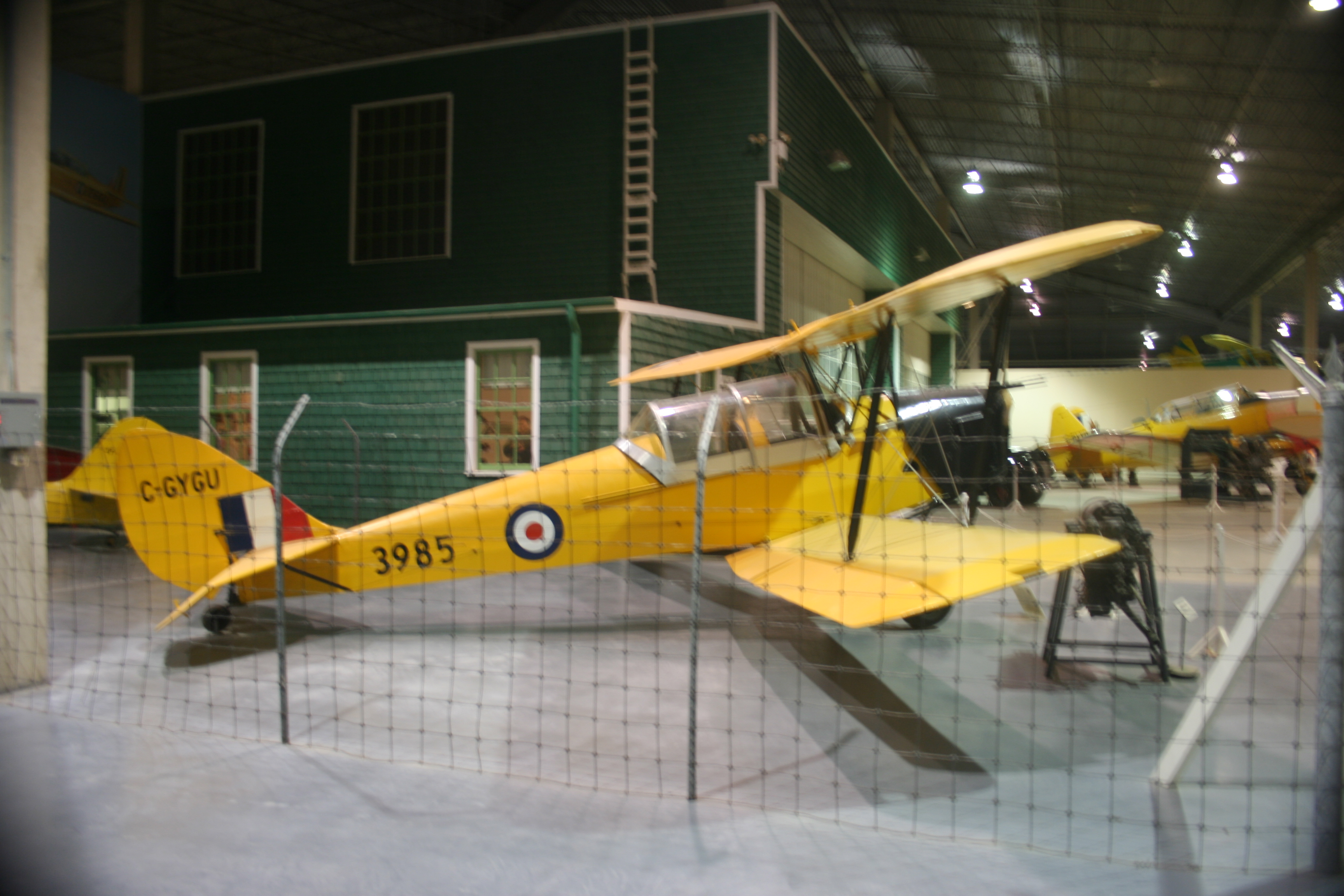
Re-creation of a BCATP base at the Western Development Museum, Moose Jaw, Saskatchewan, Canada

The success of the British Commonwealth Air Training Plan illustrated that the Commonwealth still had political and military significance during the Second World War. The Plan was Canada's major contribution to the early war effort and was an important and unifying national achievement. Canada became one of the great air training centres and trained more than 130,000 trained aircrew for the Allied cause. The Canadian government paid about $2 billion of the Plan's cost of $2.25 billion, including $425 million of the United Kingdom's share.

On the third anniversary of the Plan, President Roosevelt enthused that the BCATP had transformed Canada into the "aerodrome of democracy", a play on his earlier description of the United States as "the arsenal of democracy".

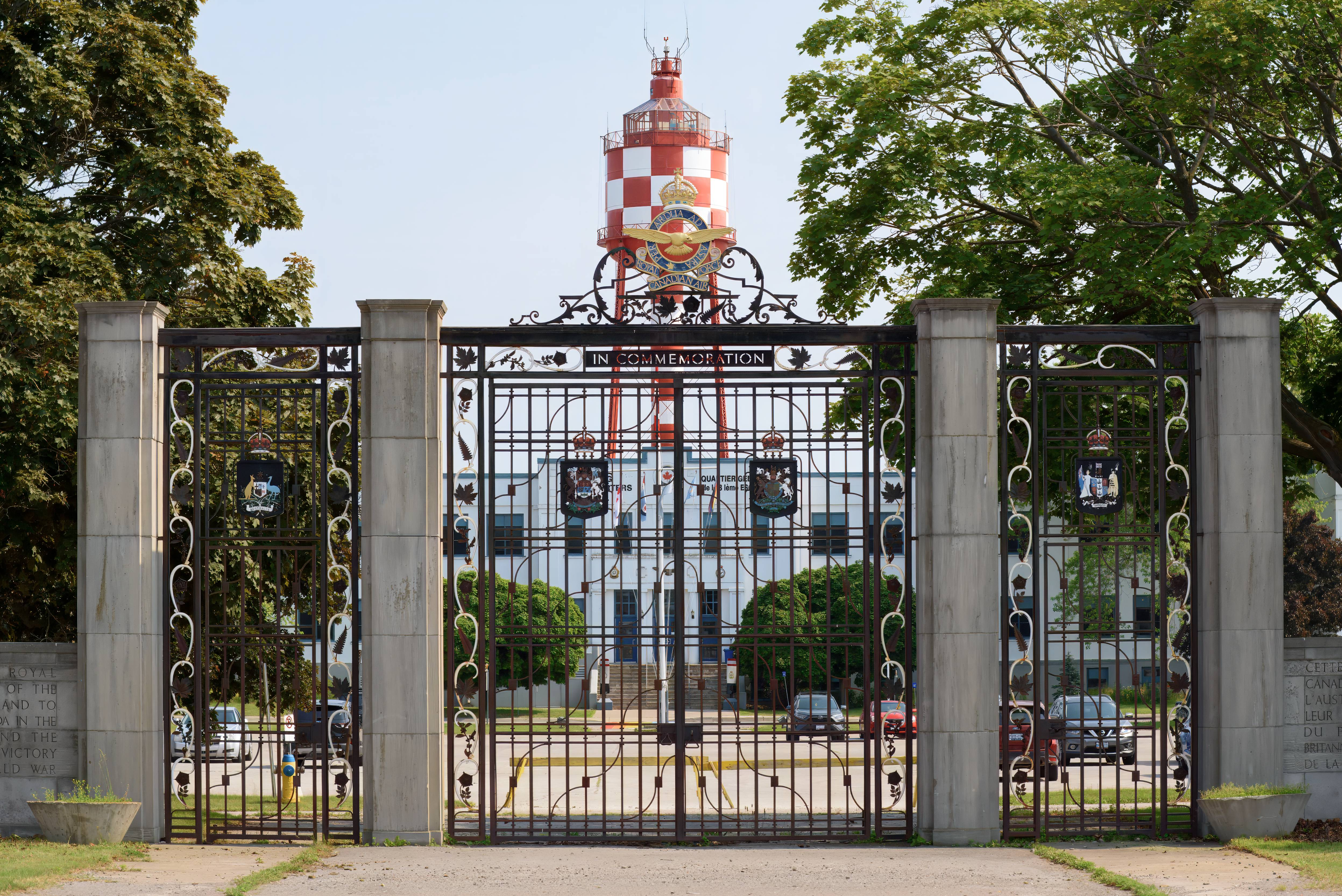
Commemorative gate at CFB Trenton

In 1949, Australia, New Zealand, and the United Kingdom presented Canada with memorial wrought iron gates for the entrance to the parade square at CFB Trenton. The gates commemorate the successful wartime partnership and enduring friendship between the four countries.

The plan spawned a modern air force, a strong Canadian postwar aviation sector of the economy and left new or improved airports all across the country. The classic BCATP airport consisted of three runways, each typically 2,500 ft (760 m) in length, arranged in a triangle so that aircraft could always land (more-or-less) into the wind – that was critically important at a time when most light training aircraft (such as the North American Harvard) were taildraggers, which are difficult to land in strong cross-winds.

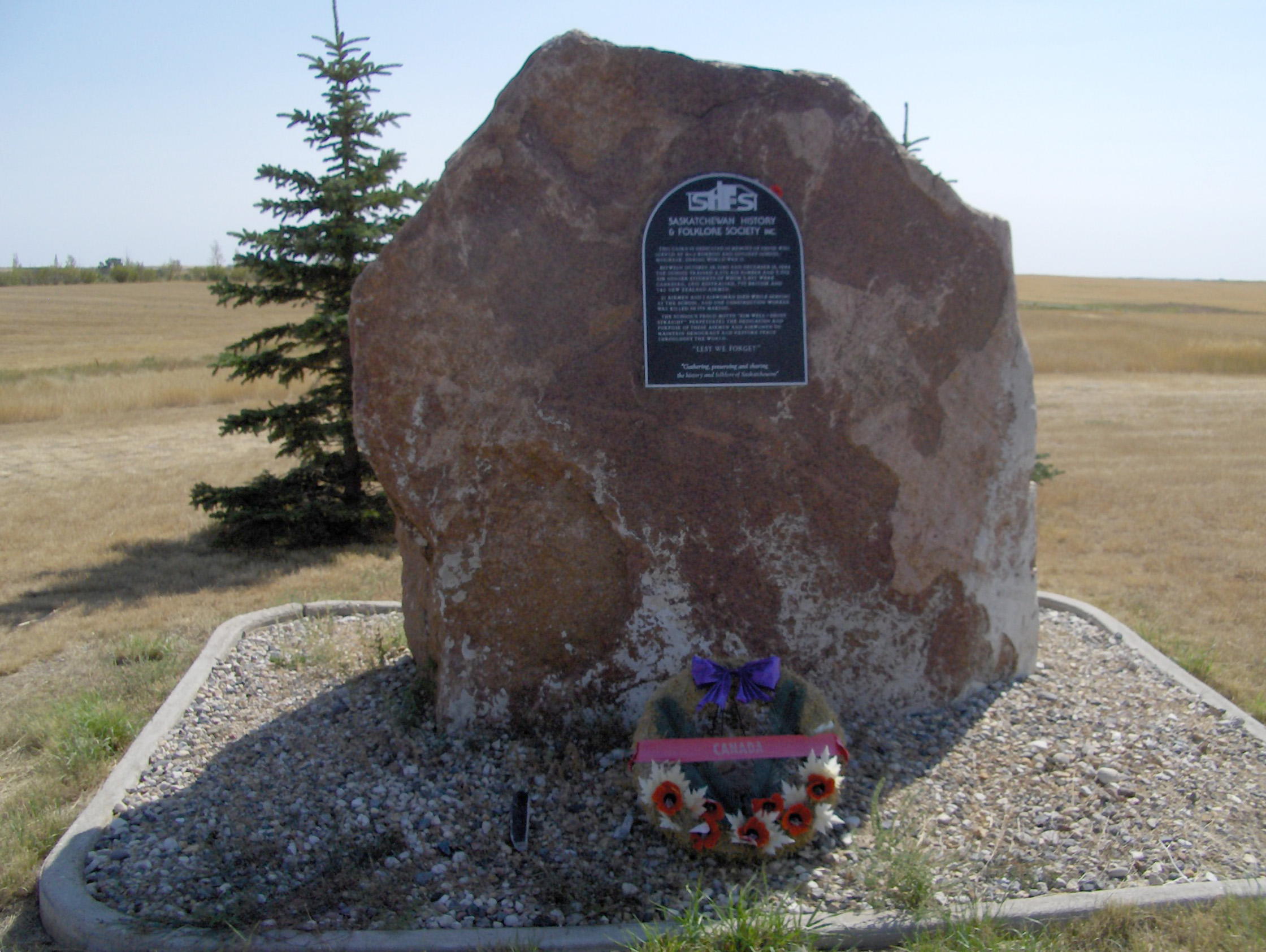
A memorial cairn at the location of the former RCAF Station Mossbank

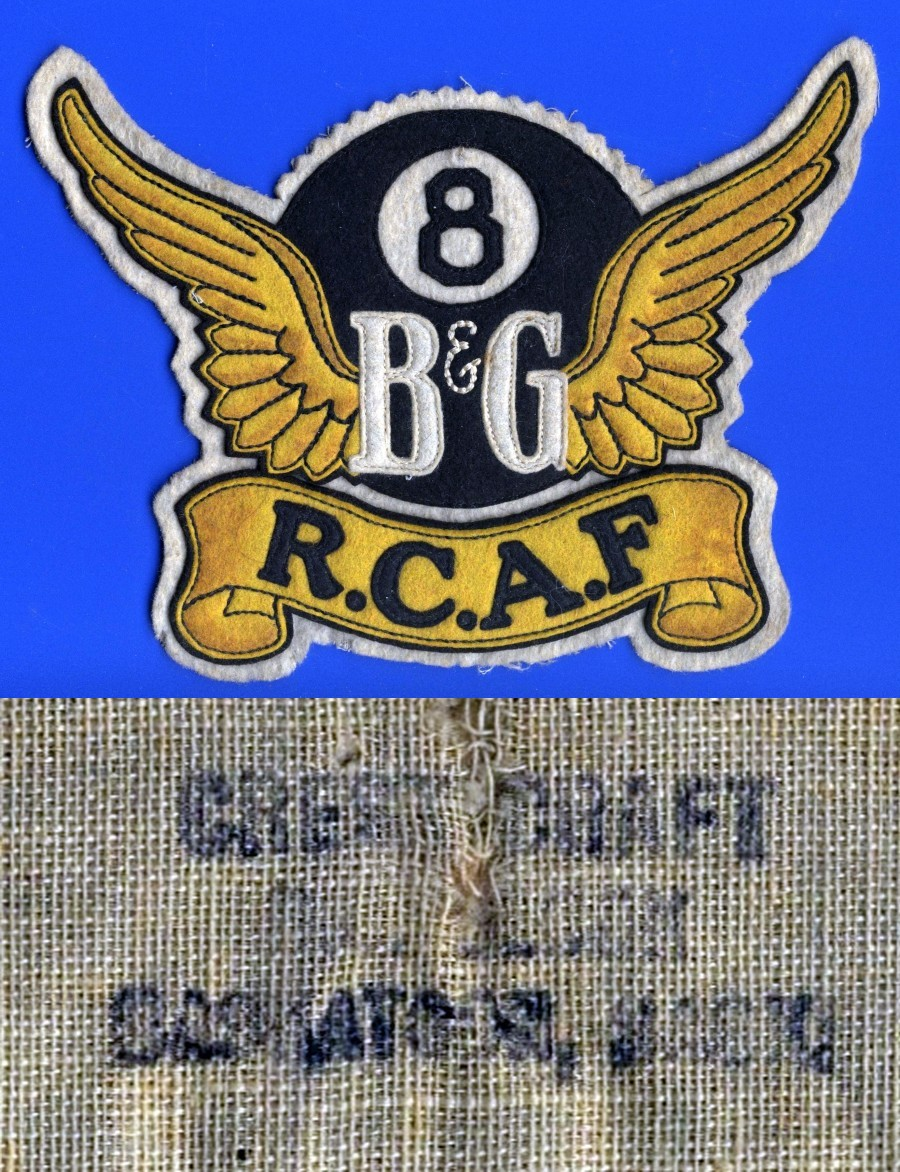
An RCAF WWII jacket patch for No. 8 Bomb and Gunnery School at Lethbridge, AB. The Crest Craft D.C. Block back-stamp dates to the early 1940s.

That triangular runway outline is perfectly preserved at Claresholm Industrial Airport but is still easily visible under postwar runway extensions at other former BCATP airports, such as Kingston/Norman Rogers Airport, Boundary Bay Airport and Brantford Airport. Many BCATP airports are still in use in 2024.

The BCATP provided an economic boost in the western provinces that were still recovering from the Great Depression. The final report of the BCATP Supervisory Board calculated that "more than 3,750 members of the RAF, RAAF, RNZAF and Allied nationals under RAF quotas married Canadian girls," many of whom remained in Canada to raise families.

In 1959, Queen Elizabeth II unveiled the Ottawa Memorial, a monument erected to commemorate, "by name, some 800 men and women who lost their lives while serving or training with the Air Forces of the Commonwealth in Canada, the West Indies and the United States and who have no known grave."

Various aircraft, transport and training objects may be seen at the Commonwealth Air Training Plan Museum, in Brandon, Manitoba. This museum is non-profit and was founded and operated by volunteers dedicated to the preservation of the history of the British Commonwealth Air Training Plan. It serves as a unique memorial to those airmen who trained and served, especially to those who died for their country in the air war of 1939–1945. This is the only museum in the world dedicated solely to this goal, located in Manitoba where so much of the training was carried out. The collection includes 14 aircraft on display including the museum's airworthy Auster, Harvard, Cornell and Stinson HW-75.

Aircraft and related items of the BCATP are preserved at many other museums across Canada including the Canadian Harvard Aircraft Association, the Canadian Warplane Heritage Museum, the Reynolds-Alberta Museum, and the National Air Force Museum of Canada.

The British Commonwealth Air Training Plan was the precursor of post-war international air training schemes in Canada, many of them involving personnel from other NATO powers. These include the NATO Air Training Plan (1950–1957) that graduated 4,600 pilots and navigators from 10 countries. Later bilateral arrangements with individual NATO powers (1959–1983), the Military Training Assistance Plan, which has trained aircrews from developing countries since 1964 and NATO Flying Training in Canada (NFTC), since 1998, a partnership of the Canadian Forces, Bombardier Aerospace Corporation and participating air forces. In 2005, the Canadian Department of National Defence awarded a 22-year, $1.77-billion contract to an Allied Wings team led by Kelowna Flightcraft Ltd. of Kelowna, British Columbia, to provide flying training and support services to the Canadian Forces and international allies. These services are provided out of the Canada Wings Aviation Training Centre in the Southport Aerospace Centre near Portage la Prairie, Manitoba.

The British Commonwealth Air Training Plan was designated a National Historic Event on 18 November 1983.

=== Australia ===
The "Scheme" cost Australia about £100,000,000 for its commitments. In addition to the Empire Air Training Scheme, wartime demands had led to training for home requirements. The RAAF built air training and ground training schools, airfields and specialised schools that served the country well in wartime as well as postwar. All the service flying training schools were disbanded, except Uranquinty. The Uranquinty Base continued to provide refresher courses for qualified pilots and even briefly became a migrant centre in the late 1940s until it reopened as No 1 Basic Flying Training School between 1951 and 1959 when it finally closed. The Wireless Air Gunners' School at Ballarat remained as the RAAF Radio School until 1961.

A memorial was dedicated to 5 Service Flying Training School RAAF, within the Empire Air Training Scheme at Uranquinty, 19 September 1999.

EATS pilot training schools at Evans Head, New South Wales, Cunderdin, Western Australia, Point Cook, Victoria, Essendon, Victoria, and Laverton, Victoria, are on state or national heritage lists. Wireless operator/air gunners' schools at Maryborough, Queensland, and Ballarat, Victoria, are currently recommended for state heritage listing.

== See also ==
- Article XV squadrons
- Australia and the Empire Air Training Scheme
- British Flying Training School Program
- Bermuda Flying School
- Civilian Pilot Training Program of the United States
- List of British Commonwealth Air Training Plan facilities in South Africa
- List of British Commonwealth Air Training Plan facilities in Southern Rhodesia
- Category:Airports of the British Commonwealth Air Training Plan
