= RAF Binbrook =

Former Royal Air Force flying base in Lincolnshire, England

RAF Binbrook
- Near Binbrook, Lincolnshire in England
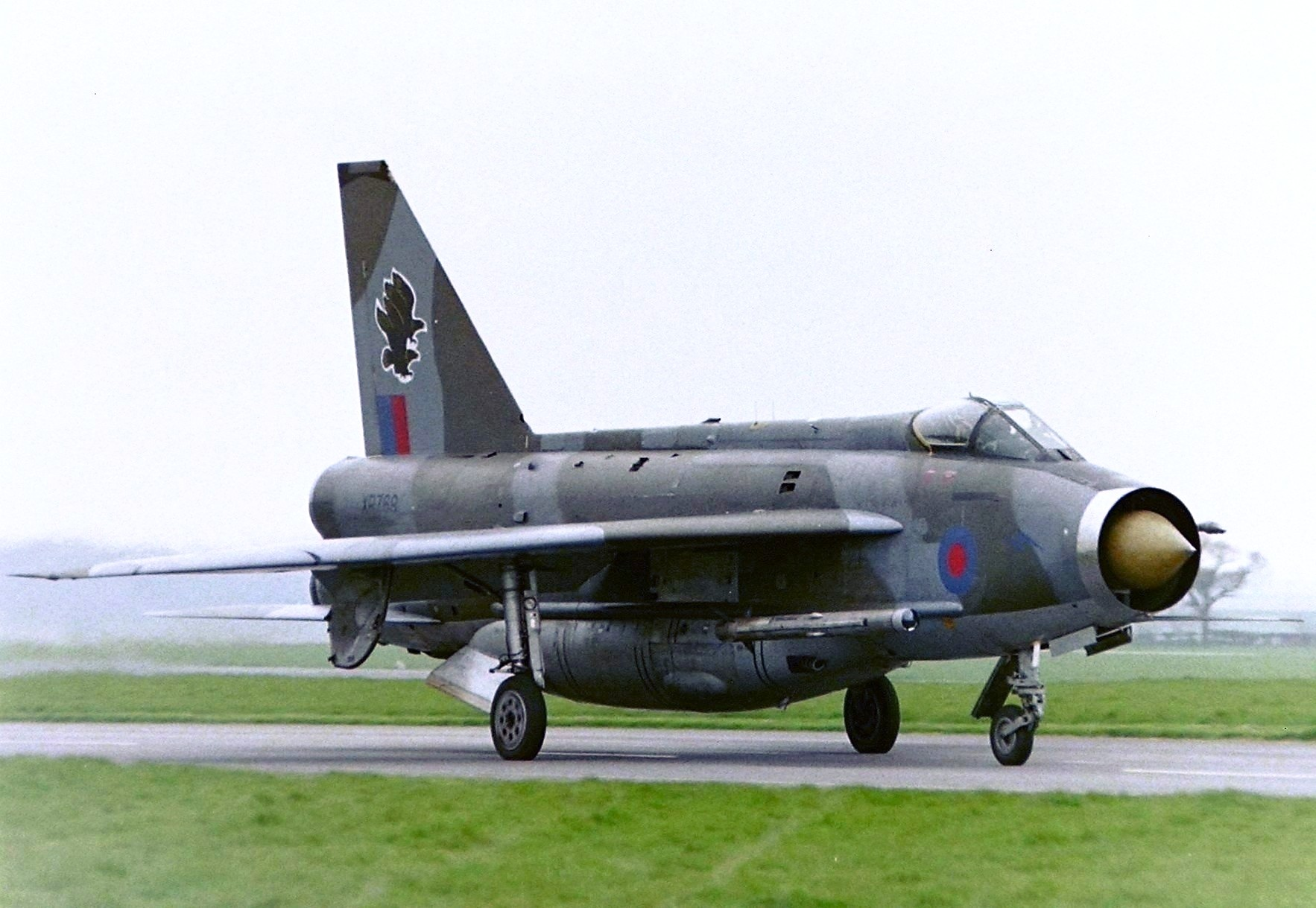
- The RAF operated the English Electric Lightning from RAF Binbrook between 1965 and 1988

Site information
- Type: Royal Air Force station
- Code: BK
- Owner: Ministry of Defence
- Operator: Royal Air Force
- Controlled by: RAF Bomber Command * No. 1 Group RAF
- Condition: Closed

Location
- Shown within Lincolnshire RAF Binbrook (the United Kingdom)
- Coordinates: 53°26′45″N 000°12′32″W
- Grid reference: TA190960

Site history
- Built: 1939/40
- In use: June 1940–1995
- Fate: Site sold, technical buildings and hangars in use as an industrial park, domestic site established as Brookenby village
- Battles/wars: European theatre of World War II; Cold War

Airfield information
- Identifiers: IATA: GSY, ICAO: EGXB, WMO: 033880
- Elevation: 373 feet (114 m) AMSL
Runways
| Direction | Length and surface |
|---|---|
| 03/21 | 2,286 metres (7,500 ft) Asphalt |
| 00/00 | Concrete/Tarmac |
| 00/00 | Concrete/Tarmac |

Royal Air Force Binbrook or RAF Binbrook is a former Royal Air Force station located near Binbrook, Lincolnshire, England. The old domestic site (married quarters) has been renamed to become the village of Brookenby. RAF Binbrook was primarily used by Bomber Command in the Second World War. The Central Fighter Establishment moved to Binbrook from RAF West Raynham between 1959 and 1962 and two English Electric Lightning squadrons were stationed there between 1965 and 1988.

== History ==
=== Bombers ===
RAF Binbrook was opened as a Bomber Command station in June 1940 during the Second World War and home to No. 12 Squadron RAF, with Vickers Wellington II and III, between 3 July 1940 and 25 September 1942 before it moved to RAF Wickenby. Another squadron stationed at Binbrook before 1942 was 142, with the Fairey Battle, from 3 July 1940 to 12 August 1940 and from 6 September 1940 to 26 November 1941 when it moved to RAF Waltham. The squadron used the Battle until November 1940 before switching to the Wellington II.

RAF Binbrook closed in 1942 for the installation of three concrete runways, reopening in 1943 as home to No. 460 Squadron, Royal Australian Air Force. Post-war, Binbrook was home to a number of distinguished RAF bomber squadrons, notably IX, 12, 101 and 617, all four of which were there for more than a decade. The airfield saw the start of the RAF's transition to jet bombers with the arrival of the first English Electric Canberras.

=== Fighters ===
After the departure of IX and 12 squadrons in 1959, 64 Squadron with Gloster Javelin all-weather fighters moved to Binbrook together with part of the Central Fighter Establishment from RAF West Raynham. 85 Target Facilities Squadron also moved to Binbrook with a mixture of Canberras and Gloster Meteors.

=== Lightnings ===
English Electric Lightnings moved to Binbrook in 1965 with 5 Squadron, and 1972 with 11 Squadron. 5 and 11 were the last two RAF Lightning squadrons. 5 Squadron re-equipped with the Panavia Tornado F.3 at RAF Coningsby early in 1988, leaving 11 Squadron to continue at Binbrook for a few more months with the remaining few Lightnings in RAF service. When 11 Squadron disbanded to also re-equip with the Tornado F.3 at RAF Leeming, the Lightning was withdrawn from service.

=== Closure ===
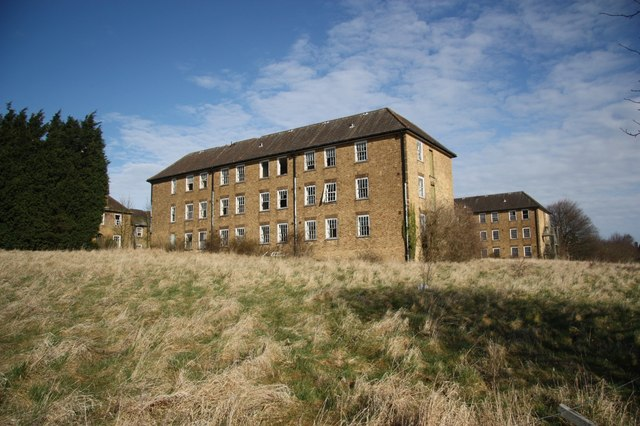
The former officers' mess at RAF Binbrook in 2009

The station closed as a main operating base in the 1980s, although it continued as a relief landing ground for RAF Scampton into the early 1990s before eventually closing and all military activity ceasing, it was subsequently sold off for development.

The control tower and adjacent fire section were demolished in 1995. In the mid-90s, Lincolnshire Police and Humberside Police used the site to teach riot control techniques to its police officers.

As of 2012 a majority of the accommodation blocks have been demolished. The hangars and offices are used as an industrial estate housing many businesses. The flight line is fenced off and used for storage of mainly ex-military equipment awaiting resale. The married quarters are private housing, forming the new village of Brookenby. There is also a memorial to 460 Squadron (RAAF) consisting of a memorial plaque and benches around the former ident square.

The following units were here at some point:

- No. 1 Group Target Towing Flight RAF (November 1941) became No. 1481 (Target Towing) Flight RAF (November 1941 - January 1942) became No. 1481 (Target Towing and Gunnery) Flight RAF (January - November 1942)
- No. 50 Squadron RAF
- No. 109 Squadron RAF
- No. 139 Squadron RAF
- No. 460 Squadron RAAF Notably, the squadron: flew the most sorties of any Australian bomber squadron; dropped more bomb tonnage than any other squadron in Bomber Command; lost 188 aircraft and suffered 1,018 combat deaths.
- No. 643 Volunteer Gliding School RAF (June 1991 - October 1992)
- 819 Naval Air Squadron
- 849 Naval Air Squadron
- No. 849B Flight of 849 NAS
- Air Bomber Training Flight (No. 1 Group) RAF (June - September 1942)
- Bomber Command Aircraft Maintenance Unit RAF (July 1952 - ?)
- Bomber Command Jet Conversion Flight RAF (December 1950 - July 1952)
- Bomber Command Supply Support Unit RAF (October - November 1956)
- Day Fighter Combat Squadron RAF (November 1962 - November 1965)
- Instant Readiness Reserve Unit RAF (June 1979 - 1981) became Lightning Augmentation Flight RAF (1981 - 82)
- Lightning Special Engineering Project Team RAF (April 1974 - ?)
- Lightning Training Flight RAF (October 1975 - April 1987)

== Popular culture ==
In 1989 RAF Binbrook alongside RAF Little Rissington served as the USAAF airbase for filming for the 1990 movie Memphis Belle. Some of the aircrew of the original "Memphis Belle", a Boeing B-17 Flying Fortress, visited Binbrook during the filming, and met the cast of the movie. Robert Hanson, the airplane's radio operator, said the cast were "... not quite as good-looking as we were ... but they are young and enthusiastic—exactly like we were."

== See also ==
- List of former Royal Air Force stations
