= Binbrook =

Village in England

Coordinates: 53.429693°N 0.179742°W

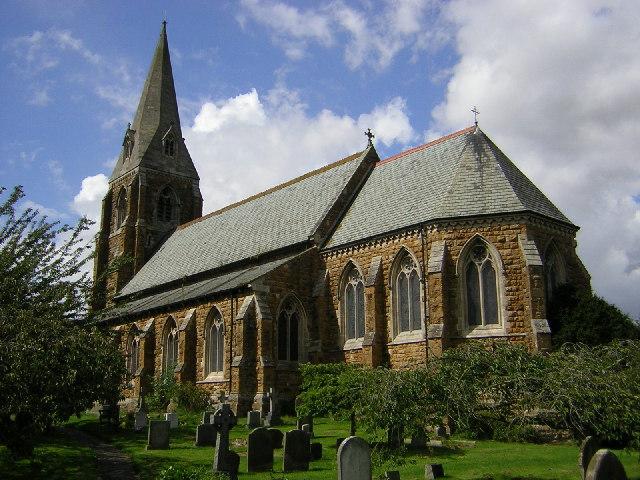
- Church of St Mary and St Gabriel, Binbrook

- Location within Lincolnshire
- Population: 892 (2011)
- OS grid reference: TF210940
  - London: 130 mi (210 km) s
- District: East Lindsey
- Shire county: Lincolnshire
- Region: East Midlands
- Country: England
- Sovereign state: United Kingdom
- Post town: Market Rasen
- Postcode district: LN8
- Dialling code: 01472
- Police: Lincolnshire
- Fire: Lincolnshire
- Ambulance: East Midlands
- UK Parliament: Louth and Horncastle

Binbrook is a village and civil parish in the East Lindsey district of Lincolnshire, England. It is situated on the B1203 road, and 8 miles (13 km) north-east from Market Rasen.

Previously a larger market town, it now has a population of about 700, rising to 892 at the Census 2011.

It is mentioned in the Domesday Book as Binnibroc.

Binbrook Grade II listed Anglican parish church is dedicated to St Mary and St Gabriel. There were two village churches, St Mary and St Gabriel, since disappeared. St Gabriel's was already in ruins in 1822 while St Mary's was demolished in 1867. A new church with joint dedication was built in 1869 by James Fowler. In 1988 a new stained glass window was gifted to the church to commemorate the RAF presence from 1940 to 1988.

Binbrook was the birthplace of the traditional singer Joseph Taylor, one of the Lincolnshire singers recorded by Percy Grainger.

Binbrook is close to the site of Binbrook Airfield, originally opened as RAF Binbrook; the airfield housing is now the new village of Brookenby.

== Governance ==
An electoral ward in the same name exists. This ward stretches south east to Fotherby with a total population taken at the 2011 census of 1,831.

== Orford ==
To the north is the site of the lost medieval village of Orford. Orford was the site of a priory of Premonstratensian nuns. The priory was founded around 1170 by Ralf d'Albini of the Anglo-Norman baronial house of Mowbray, and was endowed with the church at Wragby. At the time of suppression in 1539 it held a prioress and 7 nuns.

== Australian connection ==
Granby Crescent, in the Geelong suburb of Highton, is named after the Marquis of Granby pub, which was frequented by members of the 460 Squadroon RAAF.
