= No. 460 Squadron RAAF =

Royal Australian Air Force squadron

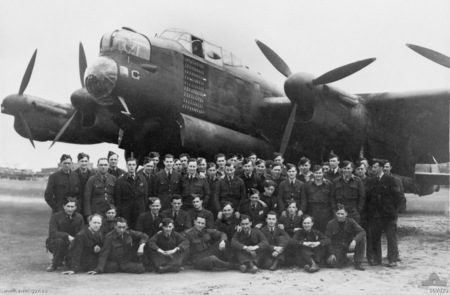
- Some of No. 460 Squadron RAAF's ground crew posing in front of the Avro Lancaster bomber G for George at RAF Binbrook, May 1944
- Active: 15 November 1941 – 10 October 1945; 2 July 2010 – current
- Country: Australia
- Branch: Royal Australian Air Force
- Role: Bomber squadron (1941–45); Imagery and geographic intelligence (2010–current)
- Part of: No. 8 Group RAF, Bomber Command (Nov 41 – Dec 41); No. 1 Group RAF, Bomber Command (Jan 42 – Oct 45); Defence Imagery and Geospatial Organisation (July 2010–current)
- Mottos: "Strike and Return"
- Battle honours: Fortress Europe, 1940–1944; France and Germany, 1944–1945; Ruhr, 1940–1945; Berlin, 1940–1945; German Ports, 1940–1945; Normandy, 1944; Italy, 1943–1945.

Insignia
- Squadron badge heraldry: In front of a boomerang in base a kangaroo salient. The kangaroo is a fast and powerful animal indigenous to Australia, and the boomerang is a weapon peculiar to that country.
- Squadron codes: UV (Nov 1941 – Nov 1943); AR (Nov 1943 – Oct 1945)

Aircraft flown
- Bomber: Vickers Wellington; Avro Lancaster

No. 460 Squadron is a Royal Australian Air Force intelligence unit active within the Defence Imagery and Geospatial Organisation (DIGO). It was first formed as a heavy bomber squadron during World War II on 15 November 1941 and disbanded on 10 October 1945 after seeing extensive combat over Europe. The squadron was a multinational unit, but most personnel were Australian. No. 460 Squadron was reformed on 2 July 2010 and is currently located in Canberra.

== History ==
=== World War II ===
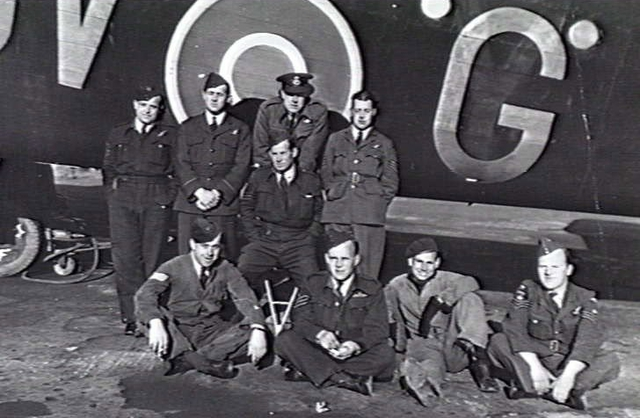
460 Squadron Halifax UV-G aircrew at RAF Breighton circa September–October 1942

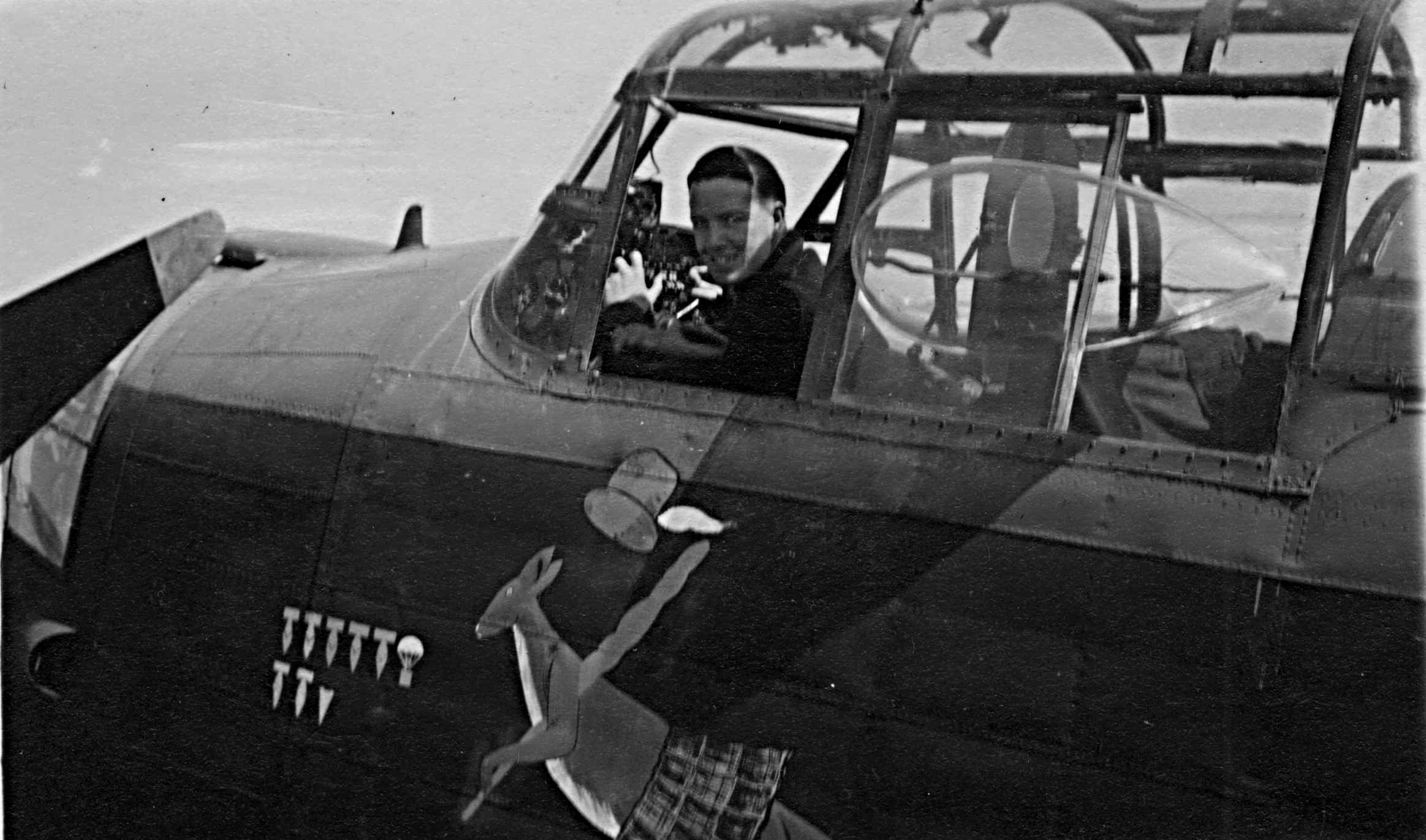
Believed to be Mack D Seale at RAF Binbrook pre-1943. The aircraft is 'N for Nuts'.

No. 460 Squadron RAAF was formed from 'C' Flight of No. 458 Squadron RAAF at RAF Molesworth, Huntingdonshire on 15 November 1941, as a bomber squadron equipped with Wellington Mk.IV aircraft. Originally part of No. 8 Group RAF, Bomber Command, the squadron moved to RAF Breighton, Yorkshire and joined No. 1 Group RAF. The squadron made its first raid, against the German city of Emden, on 12 March 1942. The following night, five crews from the squadron participated in a raid on harbour facilities around Dunkirk, during which the squadron suffered its first losses of the war when one Wellington was shot down. A six-week "apprenticeship" period followed until the end of April 1942, during which the squadron was assigned mainly to attack less heavily defended targets on the French Channel coast; nevertheless, the squadron also undertook several attacks against targets in Germany during this time also. The squadron's first three months of operations saw it carry out 34 raids. For each raid, at least two aircraft were contributed, with some raids seeing as many as 10 aircraft taking part; a 30 May 1942 raid on Cologne saw 18 aircraft from No. 460 Squadron assigned. A total of six crews were lost during these raids.

Losses between June and August amounted to 20 aircraft, and at the end of the period the squadron began to convert to Halifax Mk.IIs, but in October the squadron was re-equipped with Lancaster Mks. I and III. The following May, No. 460 Squadron relocated to RAF Binbrook, Lincolnshire, from where it participated in the strategic bombing of Germany.

In late 1943 and early 1944, the squadron flew sorties in the Battle of Berlin. During the spring and summer of 1944, the squadron flew many missions in support of the D-Day landings. Its final raid was an attack on Adolf Hitler's mountain retreat of Berchtesgaden on Anzac Day, 1945. In May, No. 460 Squadron joined Operation Manna, the transportation of relief supplies to starving Dutch civilians. The squadron moved to RAF East Kirkby, Lincolnshire, in preparation for re-location to the Pacific theatre, as part of a proposed Commonwealth strategic air force known as Tiger Force, for the invasion of Japan. The move became unnecessary following the atomic bombings of Hiroshima and Nagasaki and No. 460 Squadron disbanded on 10 October 1945.

The squadron flew the most sorties of any Australian bomber squadron and dropped more bomb tonnage than any squadron in the whole of Bomber Command—24,856 tons, which it dropped over 6,262 sorties. In doing that it lost 188 aircraft and suffered 1,018 combat deaths (589 of whom were Australian). This was the most of any Australian squadron during the war, with No. 460 Squadron effectively wiped out five times over its existence. RAF Bomber Command represented only two percent of total Australian enlistments during World War II, but accounted for almost 20 percent of personnel killed in action. Total Bomber Command losses were 55,573 for all nationalities.

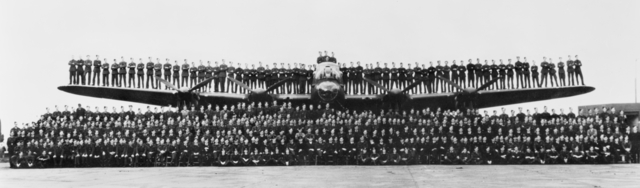
Members of 460 Squadron and the Lancaster bomber "G" for George in August 1943

No. 460 Squadron is commemorated at the Australian War Memorial by a display featuring its only surviving aircraft, G for George. This aircraft made 90 operational sorties between late 1942 and mid-1944. There is a memorial to the squadron on the site of the former RAF Binbrook, in Lincolnshire, UK, consisting of a plaque, trees and various memorial benches. There are also memorials in a number of other countries including Denmark, France, the Netherlands (Grafhorst) and Germany, marking the sites of where squadron aircraft crashed or individual crew members were killed.

=== Current role ===
On 1 April 2010, then Chief of Air Force Air Marshal Mark Binskin announced that No. 460 Squadron was to be reformed as a non-flying squadron within the Defence Imagery and Geospatial Organisation (DIGO). The squadron was subsequently re-established on 2 July at a ceremony held in front of G for George at the Australian War Memorial.

No. 460 Squadron is currently located in Canberra. Its roles include analysing photos and other imagery to help plan strike missions.

== Aircraft operated ==
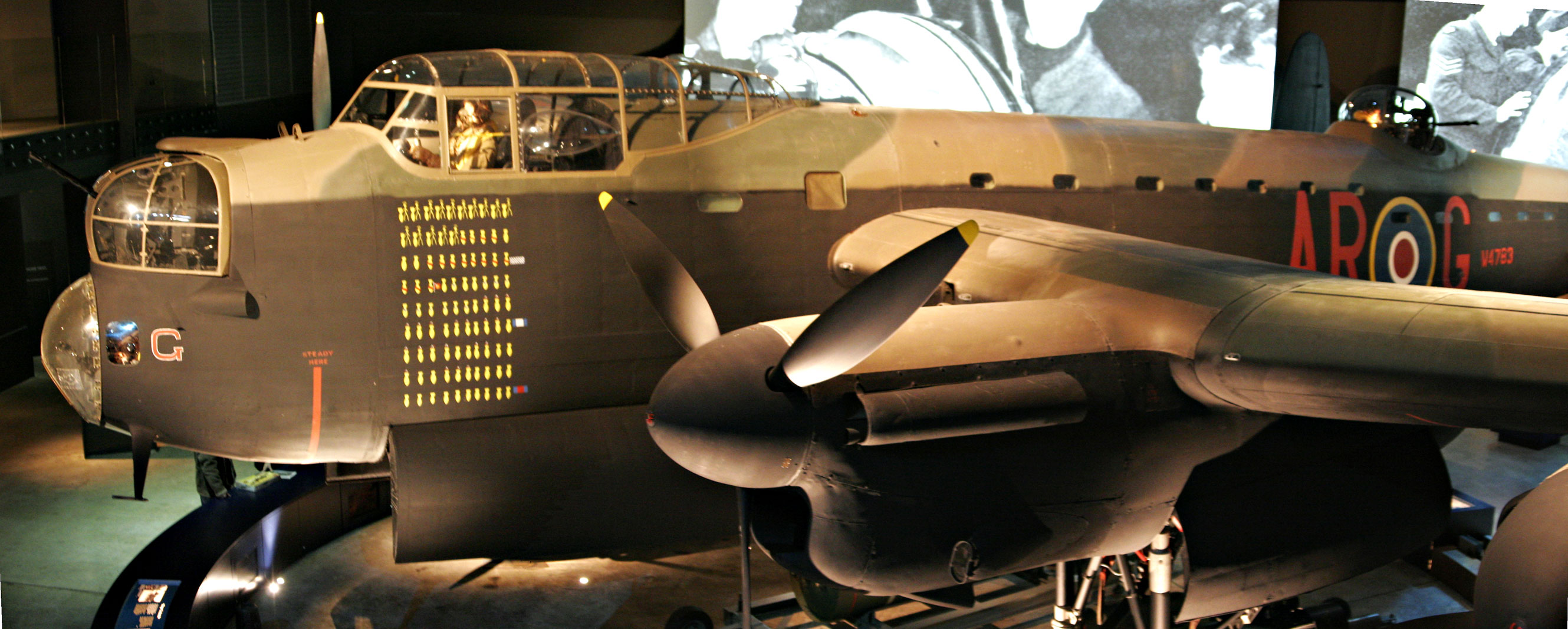
"G" for George at the Australian War Memorial, Canberra

Aircraft operated by no. 460 Squadron RAAF, data from
From	To	Aircraft	Version
November 1941	September 1942	Vickers Wellington	Mk.IV
August 1942	October 1942	Handley Page Halifax	B.Mk.II (not used operationally)
August 1942	October 1942	Avro Manchester	Mk.I (not used operationally)
October 1942	October 1945	Avro Lancaster	Mks.I, III

== Squadron bases ==
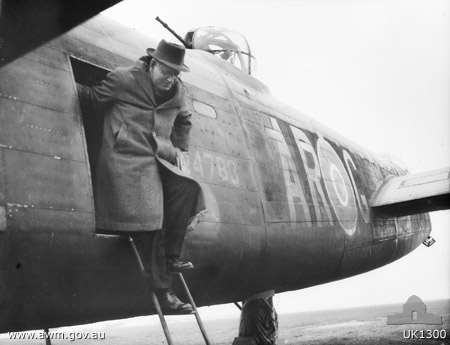
Binbrook, United Kingdom, April 1944: John Curtin, Prime Minister of Australia, getting out of the veteran Lancaster "G" for George, during his visit to 460 Squadron RAAF

Bases and airfields used by no. 460 Squadron RAAF, data from
From	To	Base
15 November 1941	4 January 1942	RAF Molesworth, Huntingdonshire
4 January 1942	14 May 1943	RAF Breighton, Yorkshire
14 May 1943	20 July 1945	RAF Binbrook, Lincolnshire
20 July 1945	10 October 1945	RAF East Kirkby, Lincolnshire

== Commanding officers ==
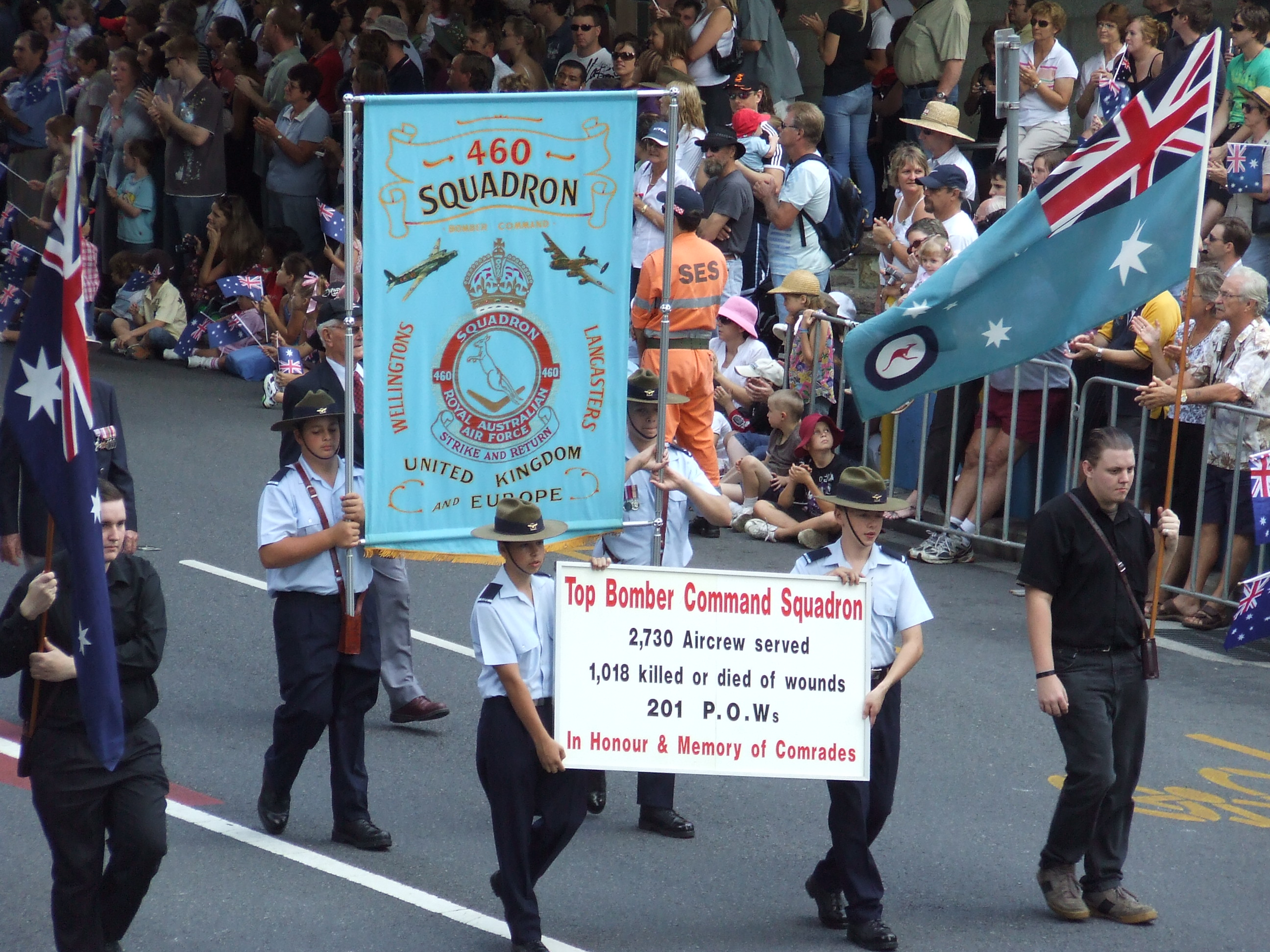
460 Squadron is remembered as part of the 2007 Anzac Day Parade in Brisbane.

Officers commanding no. 460 Squadron RAAF, data from
From	To	Name
November 1941	September 1942	Wing Commander A.L.G Hubbard, DSO, DFC
September 1942	December 1942	Wing Commander K.W. Kaufman, DFC
December 1942	February 1943	Wing Commander J.F. Dilworth, DFC
February 1943	September 1943	Wing Commander C.E. Martin, DSO, DFC
September 1943	8 October 1943 (POW)	Wing Commander R.A. Norman, DSO, DFC
October 1943	January 1944	Wing Commander F.A. Arthur, DFC
January 1944	May 1944	Wing Commander H.D. Marsh, DFC
May 1944	October 1944	Wing Commander J.K. Douglas, DFC
October 1944	November 1944	Wing Commander K.R.J. Parsons, DSO, DFC
November 1944	13 December 1944 (KIA)	Squadron Leader J. Clark, DFC
December 1944	January 1945	Wing Commander W.E. Roberts, DFC
January 1945	July 1945	Wing Commander M.G. Cowan, DSO
July 1945	October 1945	Wing Commander P.H. Swan, DSO, DFC
July 2010	December 2010	Wing Commander P.D. Wooding, MNZM
January 2011	January 2014	Wing Commander R.J.Elliott, CSM
January 2014	July 2016	Wing Commander N.Klohs
July 2016	January 2019	Wing Commander C. Harrison
January 2019	January 2021	Wing Commander A. Hoffmann, CSC
January 2021	January 2023	Wing Commander A. Cullen
January 2023	Present	Wing Commander D. Brown -

== See also ==
- Article XV squadrons
- Roberts Dunstan
