= No. 625 Squadron RAF =

- Active: 1 October 1943 – 7 October 1945
- Country: United Kingdom
- Branch: Royal Air Force
- Type: Inactive
- Role: Bomber Squadron
- Part of: No. 1 Group RAF, Bomber Command
- Motto: We Avenge
- Aircraft: Avro Lancaster

Insignia
- Squadron Badge heraldry: Within a circular chain of seven links, a Lancaster rose The Lancaster rose stands for the aircraft used, the seven links the number of personnel in one such aircraft
- Squadron Codes: CF (Oct 1943 - Oct 1945)

Aircraft flown
- Bomber: Avro Lancaster; Four-engined heavy bomber

No. 625 Squadron RAF was a heavy bomber squadron of the Royal Air Force during the Second World War.

== History ==
No. 625 Squadron was formed on 1 October 1943 at RAF Kelstern, Lincolnshire from 'C' flight of 100 Squadron. It was equipped with Avro Lancasters, as part of No. 1 Group RAF in Bomber Command, of which it formed part between 18 October 1944 and 25 April 1945. The squadron mainly carried out night raids against Germany. On 5 April 1945, it moved to RAF Scampton. At the end of the war, the squadron dropped food to the starving Dutch people (Operation Manna), and flew Prisoner of War repatriation flights from Belgium (Operation Exodus) and repatriated British troops from Italy, before it was disbanded on 7 October 1945.

In December 2010 the entire No. 625 Squadron Operational Records (ORB) and an Air Crew Roll Of Honour was compiled into a searchable database - contact www.lancaster-archive.com for more information

=== First operational mission ===
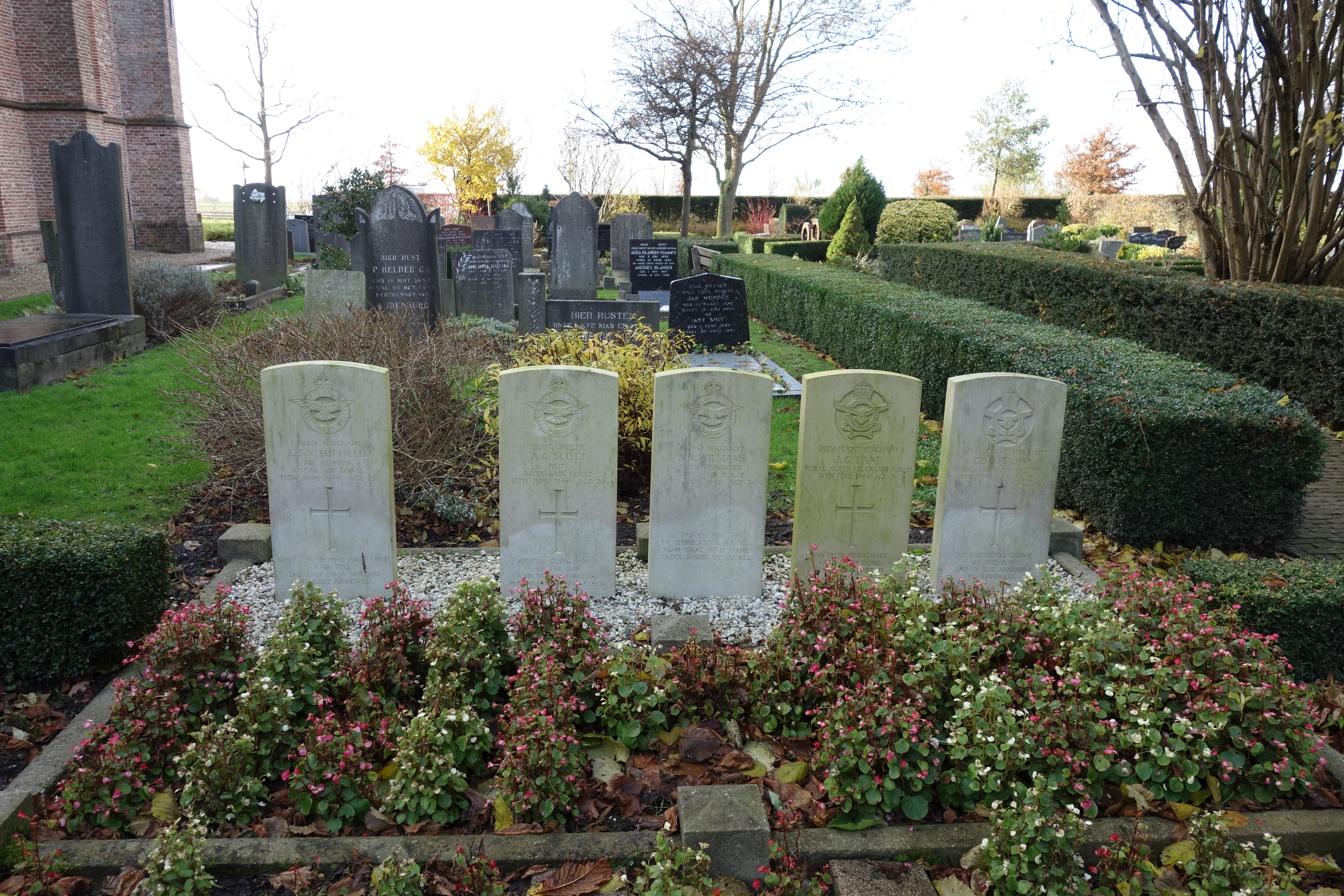
CWGC graves in Spanbroek, North Holland, of five members of 625 Squadron who died in 12/13 June 1944 returning from Operation Gelsenkirchen. Target was the Nordstern Synthetic Oil Refinery.

18–19 October 1943

- 9 Lancasters bombed Hanover

=== Last operational mission ===
25 April 1945

- 11 Lancasters bombed Obersalzberg

=== Last mission before V.E. (Victory of Europe) Day ===
7 May 1945

- 13 Lancasters dropped supplies to Dutch at Rotterdam and another Lancaster aborted

== Aircraft operated ==
Aircraft operated by no. 625 Squadron RAF, data from
From	To	Aircraft	Variant
October 1943	October 1945	Avro Lancaster	Mks.I & II

== Squadron bases ==
Bases and airfields used by no. 625 Squadron RAF, data from
From	To	Base
October 1943	April 1945	RAF Kelstern, Lincolnshire
April 1945	October 1945	RAF Scampton, Lincolnshire

The squadron memorial stands near the village of Kelstern. It was erected in 1964 and was the first to be erected to the memory of a single squadron.

== Notable members ==
- David Mattingley, DFC
- Robert Byron Pattison, DFC
- Donald Fairborn DFC
- Francis Aldred
- William Stuart Telford, DFC
- Edward Norman (Ted) Bell, Distinguished Flying Cross, Australia.
- James King law
- Flt. Lt. Burford (Skipper, Kelstern 44–45)
- F/S Tony Gilbert (Rear Gunner, Kelstern 44–45)
- Sgt. Forder (Engineer, Kelstern 44–45)
- F/O Lines (B/A, Kelstern 44–45)
- F/S Hood (Navigator, Kelstern 44–45)
- Sgt Baker (Mid Upper, Kelstern 44–45)
- F/S David Bernard Colebrooke (Bomb Aimer Kelstern 44–45)
- Flt. Lt. AB Fulbrook DFC (Pilot, Kelstern, 44–45)

== See also ==
- List of Royal Air Force aircraft squadrons

Francis Aldred
