= Saxby All Saints =

Village and civil parish in North Lincolnshire, England

Coordinates: 53.636045°N 0.502343°W

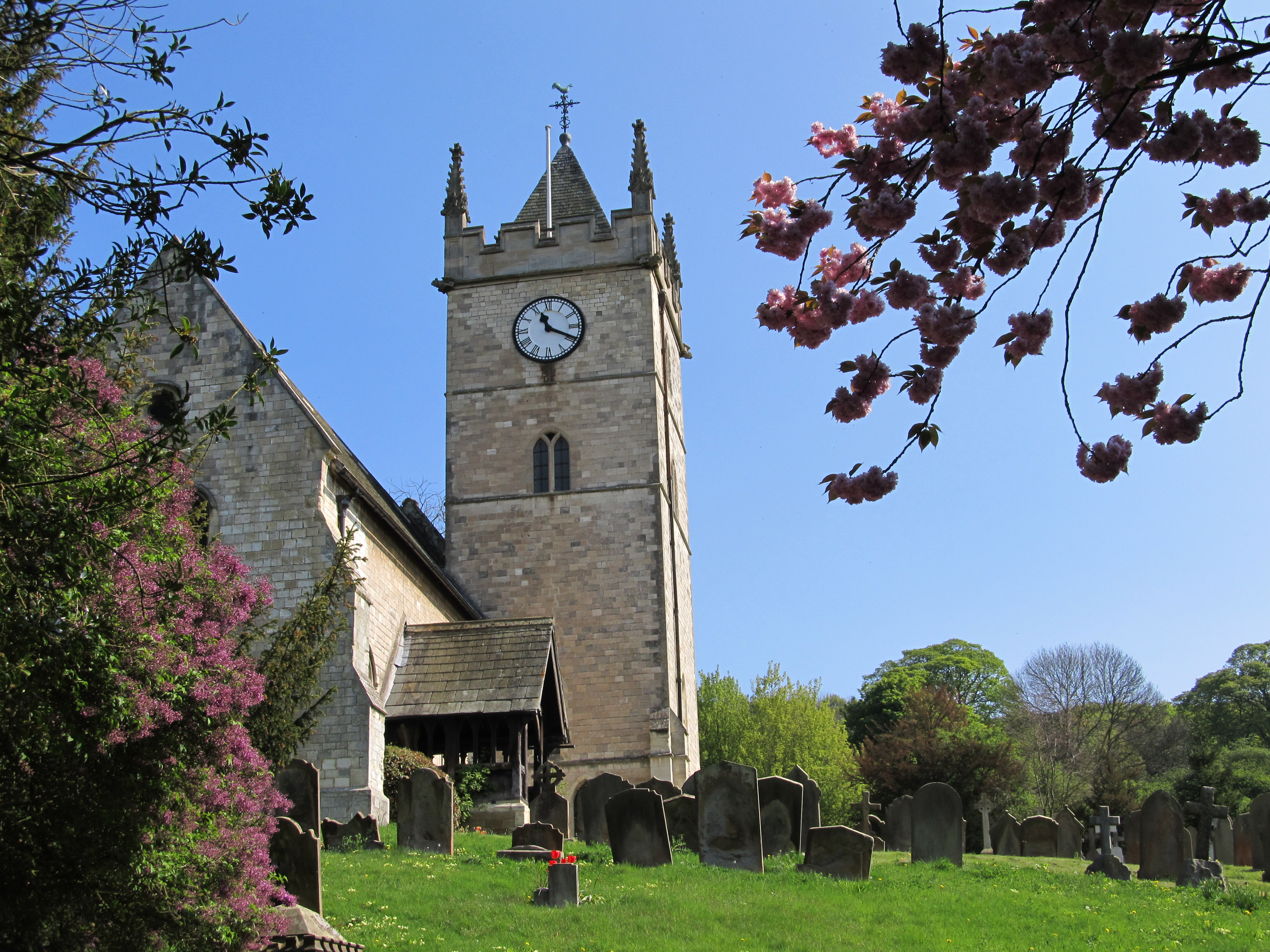
- All Saints' Church

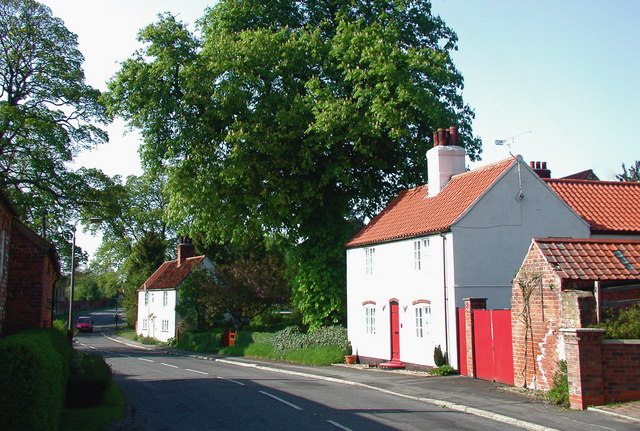
- Main street

- Location within Lincolnshire
- Population: 385 (2011)
- OS grid reference: SE991165
  - London: 150 mi (240 km) s
- Unitary authority: North Lincolnshire
- Ceremonial county: Lincolnshire
- Region: Yorkshire and the Humber
- Country: England
- Sovereign state: United Kingdom
- Post town: Brigg
- Postcode district: DN20
- Police: Humberside
- Fire: Humberside
- Ambulance: East Midlands
- UK Parliament: Brigg and Immingham

Saxby All Saints is a village and civil parish in North Lincolnshire, England. The population of the civil parish at the 2011 census was 385. It is 6 miles (9.7 km) north of Brigg and 4 miles (6.4 km) south-west of Barton upon Humber.

Saxby All Saints is a conservation area, and one of the five Low Villages – Worlaby, Bonby, Saxby All Saints, Horkstow and South Ferriby, between Brigg and the Humber estuary – so-called because of their position below the northern edge of the Lincolnshire Wolds, an Area of Outstanding Natural Beauty.

== History ==
According to Mills', Saxby probably either derives its name from a "farmstead or village of a man called Saksi", an Old Scandinavian person name, or from "Saksar" (Saxons).

The village appears in the Domesday Book of 1086 as Saxebi, in the Yarborough Hundred of the North Riding of Lindsey. It comprised 10 households, with 8 villagers, 2 freemen, 3 fisheries, and 7½ ploughlands. The lords in 1066 were Siward and Thorgisl. By 1086 the land had passed to Roger as Lord of the manor, with Ivo Taillebois as Tenant-in-chief.

In 1885 Kelly's Directory noted Saxby as a "small but very pleasant village", 4 miles (6.4 km) north-west of Elsham railway station and near the Ancholme navigation. Parish population in 1881 was 337. It describes the 2,322 acres (9.4 km^{2}) parish land as producing chiefly wheat, oats and barley, with "good" pasture, and being half of "fine chalk subsoil and highly fertile" and half, at Saxby Carrs, consisting of "clay subsoil, of rather black nature". The village contained a post office, six farmers, a blacksmith, wheelwright, bricklayer, miller – at Saxby Mill – and a Co-operative society. Carriers from Worlaby to Barton and Brigg passed through the village daily. Noted was a National School for 90 pupils, with an average attendance of 60, which was supported by the trustees of the late John Hope Barton.

By 1905 a joiner, builder, shoemaker and a carrier were further trades in the village, and a reading room, opened in 1882, was noted, with Henry John Hope Barton esq. J.P. of Saxby Hall, son of John Hope Barton, as lord of the manor and landowner. The National School had become a Public Elementary School. A drinking fountain had been erected at the centre of the village in 1897 to commemorate the Diamond Jubilee of Queen Victoria, and in memory of a Frederick Horsley. Parish area had risen to 2,389 acres (9.7 km^{2}) which included 17 acres (0.07 km^{2}) of water. Population by 1901 had dropped to 291. In 1913 Saxby's Henry John Hope Barton became High Sheriff of Lincolnshire. By 1921 village population had dropped to 278, and in 1933 there were six farmers, one of whom was at Saxby Mill, a joiner, grocer, boot repairer, carrier and blacksmith. From Karl Wood's 1932 sketch of Saxby Mill, its known at this time Saxby Mill no longer had sails. Parish area was 2,386 acres (9.7 km^{2}), with 20 acres (0.08 km^{2}) of water.

In July 1906 folk song collectors Percy Grainger and Lucy Broadwood collected the song "Died of Love", or "A brisk young Lad he courted me", from a Saxby bailiff, Joseph Taylor. The song was noted in Broadwood's English Traditional Carols and Songs, published in 1908, although the first verse was altered to suit perceived public taste. Grainger later supplied a piano accompaniment to the song, using Taylor's melody, which was published in 1912. "Died of Love" was the base for Grainger's "Rufford Park Poachers" in his Lincolnshire Posy suite.

== Landmarks ==
Saxby's parish church is dedicated to All Saints and is a Grade II listed building. It was built by George Gilbert Scott between 1845 and 1849, with its pyramid-roofed tower, described by Pevsner as "less correct" and looking "as if it was meant for a town hall", added by in 1873 by Neville. All Saints' style is late 13th-century and includes north aisle stained glass by Charles Eamer Kempe, added in 1876. The limestone ashlar church has a Westmorland slate roof, a three-bell tower with crocketed pinnacles, and an embattled parapet. The interior comprises a chancel of three bays and a nave of five bays, with monuments to the Barton family. Kelly's Directory describes the church as "a beautiful edifice" with an 1871 "excellent organ" and church plate from the 16th century. A church clock was added to the tower by the parishioners in 1893, to commemorate the coming of age of Henry John Hope Barton, and the 1904 chancel screen was carved in the village. The church register dates from 1719. The living included a rectory and glebe lands, the gift of the Barton family and estate.

The Queen Victoria limestone column monument and drinking trough, with its waterspout a carved lion's head, also commemorates Frederick Horsley "Having been for 42 years the faithful and respected steward of this Estate". The monument is Grade II listed.

Saxby Hall is a brick-built, Grade II listed, 18th-century building remodelled in the early 19th century, with its west wing remaining from the earlier structure. It was the home of the Barton family.

Further listed landmarks are the mid- to late 18th-century brick-built Saxby Manor, the 1853 yellow-brick Old Rectory, and the 17th-century Lodge Cottage and Ivy House with barn, all on Main Street, and the mid-19th-century Saxby Bridge, on North Carr Lane, which spans the River Ancholme.

== Community ==
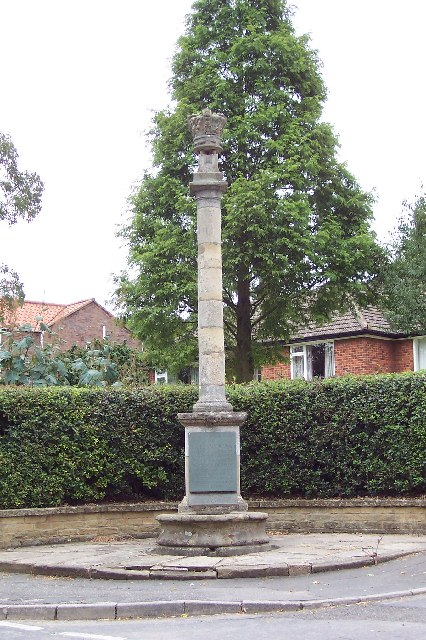
Queen Victoria memorial

Village population in 1991 was 220 and has changed little since (currently 237).

The ecclesiastical parish is also Saxby All Saints, part of the Saxby (Plurality) group of the Deanery of Yarborough. The 2013 incumbent is The Revd David Rowett.

The village lies on the Brigg to Immingham and South Ferriby to Scunthorpe bus routes.

It is home to the SaxbyFlix cinema, a community cinema project set up to provide the Low Wold Villages with a real cinema experience.

'The Saxby Carol', a Christmas carol, was composed specifically for the village in 2023 by resident musician Lucy Marshall.

== Notable residents ==
- Cherryl Fountain, artist, was born here.
- Matthew Lawrence (1596–1652), puritan preacher was born here
