= Worlaby =

Village and civil parish in North Lincolnshire, England

Coordinates: 53.611°N 0.467°W

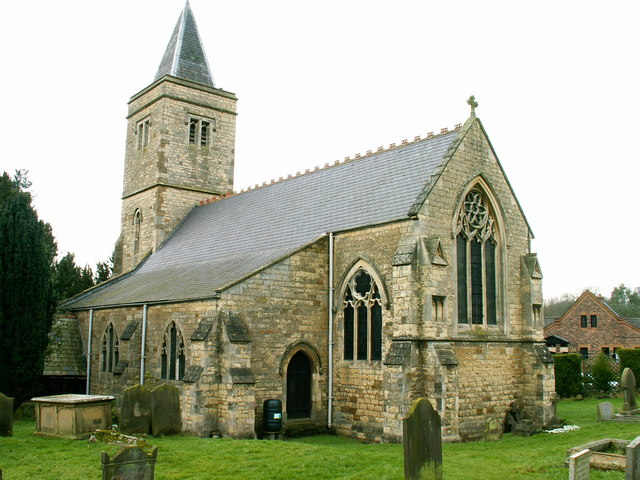
- St Clement's Church, Worlaby

- Location within Lincolnshire
- Population: 547 (2011)
- OS grid reference: TA012137
  - London: 145 mi (233 km) S
- Civil parish: Worlaby
- Unitary authority: North Lincolnshire
- Ceremonial county: Lincolnshire
- Region: Yorkshire and the Humber
- Country: England
- Sovereign state: United Kingdom
- Post town: Brigg
- Postcode district: DN20
- Dialling code: 01652
- Police: Humberside
- Fire: Humberside
- Ambulance: East Midlands
- UK Parliament: Brigg and Immingham

Worlaby is a village and civil parish in the North Lincolnshire district in Lincolnshire, England, 6 miles (10 km) south-west from Barton-Upon-Humber and 5 miles (8 km) north-east from Brigg. The population of the civil parish at the 2011 census was 547. It lies on the B1204, and to the east of the River Ancholme. It is one of the five Low Villages – South Ferriby, Horkstow, Saxby All Saints, Bonby, and Worlaby – between Brigg and the Humber estuary, named so because of their position below the northern edge of the Lincolnshire Wolds. Worlaby was part of the Glanford district, a part of the former county of Humberside between 1974 and 1996. Before that it was in the North Lindsey division of Lindsey, Lincolnshire.

== History ==
According to A Dictionary of British Place Names, Worlaby derives from a combination of an Old English person name and Old Scandinavian 'by', meaning "a farmstead or a village of a man called Wulfric".

In the Domesday Book of 1086 the village is listed as "Uluricebi" or "Wirichebi". Worlaby was in the Yarborough Hundred of the North Riding of Lindsey. It contained 24.4 households, one villager, 36 freemen, seven ploughlands, and 40 acres (0.2 km^{2}) of meadow. The settlement was under the manor of Barnetby le Wold with Earl Harold as its lord in 1066, transferred in 1086 after the Norman Conquest to William son of Nigel, with Hugh d'Avranches, Earl of Chester as Tenant-in-chief to the king William I.

In 1872 White's Directory reported that Worlaby had a population of 557 within a parish of 3,210 acres (13 km^{2}) that comprised mostly "rich areas or cars extending westward to the navigable river Ancholme, and partly on the Wold hill, on the east side of the village". The parish land was a holding of the Duchy of Lancaster, [providing income for the Privy Purse of the sovereign]. Worlaby was the seat of the Belasyse family, particularly John Belasyse (1614 – 1689), the second son to Thomas, the first Viscount Fauconberg. John Belasyse was created first Baron Belasyse of Worlaby (or Worletby) in 1644, and was first lord of the treasury to James II. Seen as being a conspirator in the fictitious Popish Plot, he was "attained, and confined for several years in the Tower". John Belasyse's hospital, founded in 1663 to house poor widows, in 1872 endowed each inmate with £3.10s. yearly, a blue gown, and half a chaldron (a volume measure), of coal, the gift of an estate at Holme in Nottinghamshire, then belonging to the trustees of the Duke of Newcastle (Newcastle upon Tyne). A further allowance to the alms-people was £4.10s. yearly from £100 left for the purpose through an 1812 benefaction.

The chancel of St Clement's Church was rebuilt in 1837, the rest of the church "an ancient structure". The church in 1872 contained seating for 150. Within was noted a tablet to Captain A. F. C. Webb, who fell at the 1854 Battle of Inkerman. The incumbency was a vicarage at a value of £378 yearly, and included 13 acres (0.05 km^{2}) of glebe land—an area of land used to support a parish priest—and a residence which was built in 1860 at a cost of £900. There existed a Wesleyan and a Primitive Methodist chapel; that for the Wesleyans was built in 1858 for £300. A new schoolroom was erected in 1871 for about £800. The Worlaby post office dispatched and received mail through Brigg.

Professions and trades listed for 1872 included the parish incumbent, the parish curate, the parish clerk & sexton, a schoolmaster who was also the sub-postmaster, a veterinary surgeon, a wheelwright, a blacksmith, a skin dealer, a cattle dealer, two tailors, one of whom was also a grocer, a further grocer, a shopkeeper, two shoemakers, a bricklayer, a brickmaker, a coal dealer & carter, a corn miller, a licensed hawker, a farrier & castrator, a market gardener, ten farmers, and two carriers—horse-drawn wagon operators carrying goods and sometimes people between places of trade—operating between the village and Barton-upon-Humber, Brigg, Caistor and Hull.

== Landmarks ==
The original 13th- to 14th-century Grade II listed parish church dedicated to St Clement was re-built between 1873 and 1877, although the early Norman piers of the nave, windows and Late Saxon tower arch were re-used. The churchyard contains the war grave of a Second World War Home Guard volunteer.

Other listed buildings include Worlaby Hospital, originally almshouses founded by John Belasyse, 1st Baron Belasyse of Worlaby, and built in 1663 for four poor women.

=== Worlaby Carrs ===
To the west of the village to the River Ancholme is Worlaby Carrs, an area of arable land converted by Defra to wet grassland as sanctuary for wintering fowl. In early 2011 a proposal to site a wind farm on the Carrs met with local opposition.
