= Horkstow =

Village and civil parish in North Lincolnshire, England

Coordinates: 53.651°N 0.5084°W

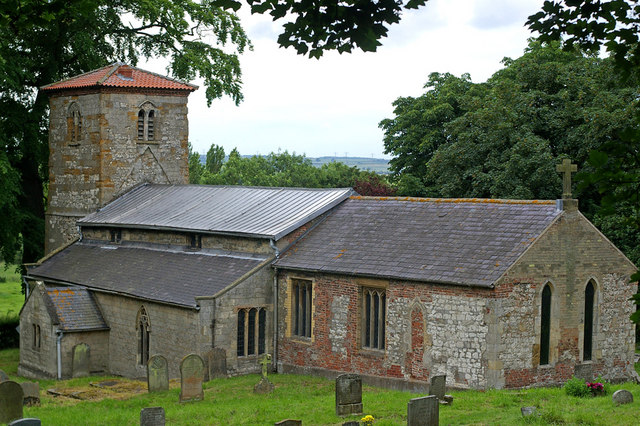
- St Maurice’s Church, Horkstow

- Location within Lincolnshire
- OS grid reference: TA01982069
  - London: 155 mi (249 km) S
- Unitary authority: North Lincolnshire
- Ceremonial county: Lincolnshire
- Region: Yorkshire and the Humber
- Country: England
- Sovereign state: United Kingdom
- Post town: BARTON-UPON-HUMBER
- Postcode district: DN18
- Dialling code: 01652
- Police: Humberside
- Fire: Humberside
- Ambulance: East Midlands
- UK Parliament: Brigg and Immingham

Horkstow is a village and civil parish in North Lincolnshire, England, 4 miles (6.4 km) south-west from Barton-upon-Humber, 1 mile (1.6 km) south from South Ferriby and 9 miles (14.5 km) north from Brigg. It lies on the B1204, and 1 mile (1.6 km) east from the navigable River Ancholme. It is one of the five "Low Villages" – Worlaby, Bonby, Saxby All Saints, Horkstow and South Ferriby – between Brigg and the Humber estuary, so-called because of their position below the northern edge of the Lincolnshire Wolds. Horkstow was previously part of Glanford administrative district, and before that, the North Lindsey division of Lindsey, Lincolnshire.

== History ==
A 4th-century Roman mosaic, part of the Horkstow Roman villa, was first discovered in 1797.

In the Domesday Book of 1086, the village is referred to as "Horchetou", although the name has gone through various changes since.

According to A Dictionary of British Place Names, Horkstow in the 12th century was known as 'Horkestowe', probably meaning "shelter for animals or people", from the Old English horc + stōw.

In 1872 White's Directory reported that Horkstow had a population of 250 within a parish of 2,085 acres (8 km^{2}). The larger part of the parish and manorial lands was owned by Charles Anderson-Pelham, 3rd Earl of Yarborough, who was lord of the manor. A suspension bridge had been erected over the River Ancholme in 1844. A mile north of the church is Horkstow Hall, the former home to Rear-Admiral (later vice-admiral) Thomas Shirley (1733–1814), and the possible site of the monastery of Diamond Dale Priory. A National School in the village was built in 1858 by Charles Anderson-Pelham, 2nd Earl of Yarborough. Parish professions and trades listed in 1872 included the parish vicar, the parish clerk who was also the sexton, a schoolmistress, a land & estate agent at Horkstow Hall who was also a farmer, a further six farmers, one of whom was also a butcher and another a coal merchant, a shoemaker, a blacksmith & wheelwright, two brick & tile makers, and a cattle dealer who was also a carrier—horse-drawn wagon operator carrying goods and sometimes people between places of trade—operating between the village and both Barton-upon-Humber and Brigg.

== Parish church ==
The parish church, built supposedly by The Knights Templar in the early 12th century, though in fact they had nothing to do with the church. It is dedicated to [St Maurice], and is Grade I listed. The vicar of the church was in fact presented by the Knights Hospitaller. The Templars never had any personnel in the parish and only owned 46 acres (26 of these meadow). It has been much rebuilt and restored since establishment; an internal restoration including reseating and costing £450 was carried out in 1868, and an external in 1895. In the 19th century the patronage of the vicarage was held by the Earls of Yarborough, the tithes (tax income from parishioners derived from their profit on sales, or extraction of produce and animals, typically to the tenth part) commuted in 1841 [under the 1836 Tithe Commutation Act], the commuted income split between the rector, and the Yarborough earls as impropriators. Other places of worship were the Wesleyan and Primitive Methodist chapels, both now converted to other use. The Wesleyan chapel was built in 1838; and rebuilt in 1869 at a cost of £1,000; the Primitive Methodist chapel was built in 1855.

== Listed buildings ==
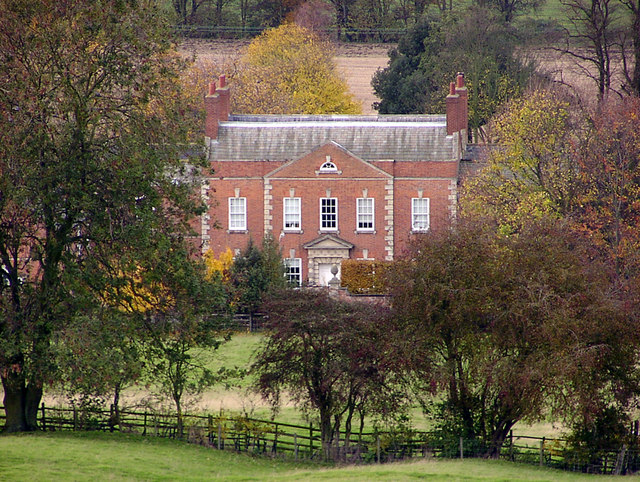
Horkstow Hall

Horkstow's Grade II listed buildings include 17th- and 18th-century barns, and various houses and cottages. Three Horkstow listed buildings, Manor Farmhouse, Horkstow Hall, and Horkstow Grange, are of particular historic note. Charles Gore was born at Horkstow Hall in 1729, he married well and died at Weimar in German high society.

In 1756 artist George Stubbs stayed at Manor Farmhouse to pursue analytical examination and meticulous drawing of horse carcasses acquired from nearby tanneries.

In 1937 Percy Grainger used the traditional Horkstow Grange folk tune as part of his Lincolnshire Posy suite. Historic folk associations with the Grange inspired the Steeleye Span band name, and their album Horkstow Grange.

== The Horkstow Roman Pavement ==
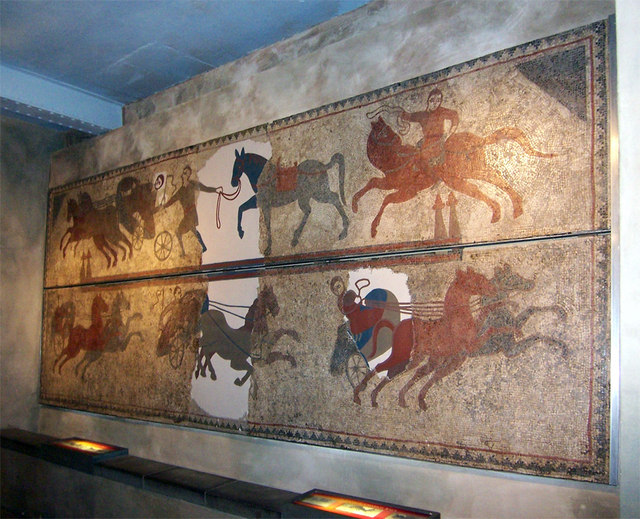
Horkstow Roman Mosaic pavement, now in Hull Museum

In 1796 three sections of a tessellated Roman mosaic pavement depicting Greek mythological figures were discovered by workmen in the grounds of Horkstow Hall. The pavement was taken to the British Museum in 1927 on permanent loan, but was transferred to the Hull and East Riding Museum in 1974.

== See also ==
- List of Templar sites in Lincolnshire
