= Green Bushes =

Traditional song

Green Bushes is an English folk song (Roud #1040, Laws P2) which is featured in the second movement of Vaughan Williams's English Folk Song Suite, in Percy Grainger's Green Bushes (Passacaglia on an English Folksong), and in George Butterworth's The Banks of Green Willow. The melody is very similar to that of the "Lost Lady Found" movement of Percy Grainger's Lincolnshire Posy, and to "Cutty Wren".

According to Roud and Bishop

This was an immensely popular song, collected many times across England, although not so often elsewhere. It was also very popular with nineteenth-century broadside printers.

The song first appears in broadsides of the 1820s or 1830s. Its popularity was hugely increased by a popular melodrama The Green Bushes, or A Hundred Years Ago by John Baldwin Buckstone, first performed in 1845. The heroine of the play made repeated reference to the song and sang a few verses, with the result that the sheet music was published soon after.

== Recordings ==
One of, if not the, earliest recordings is a 1907 performance by Joseph Taylor, collected on wax cylinder by the musicologist Percy Grainger in 1907. It was digitised by the British Library and made available online in 2018.

== Lyrics ==
As I was a walking one morning in Spring,
For to hear the birds whistle and the nightingales sing,
I saw a young damsel, so sweetly sang she:
Down by the Green Bushes he thinks to meet me.

I stepped up to her and thus I did say:
Why wait you my fair one, so long by the way?
My true Love, my true Love, so sweetly sang she,
Down by the Green Bushes he thinks to meet me.

I'll buy you fine beavers and a fine silken gown,
I will buy you fine petticoats with the flounce to the ground,
If you will prove loyal and constant to me
And forsake you own true Love, I'll be married to thee.

I want none of your petticoats and your fine silken shows:
I never was so poor as to marry for clothes;
But if you will prove loyal and constant to me
I'll forsake my own true Love and get married to thee.

Come let us be going, kind sir, if you please;
Come let us be going from beneath the green trees.
For my true Love is coming down yonder I see,
Down by the Green Bushes, where he thinks to meet me.

And when he came there and he found she was gone,
He stood like some lambkin, forever undone;
She has gone with some other, and forsaken me,
So adieu to Green Bushes forever, cried he.
