= Malcolm Fleming =

Malcolm Fleming may refer to:

- Malcolm Fleming, Earl of Wigtown (died 1363)
- Malcolm Fleming, 1st Lord Fleming (c. 1437–1477)
- Malcolm Fleming, 3rd Lord Fleming (died 1547)

== See also ==
- Malcolm Flemyng (died 1764), writer
