= William Taylor (folk song) =

Song

- Song
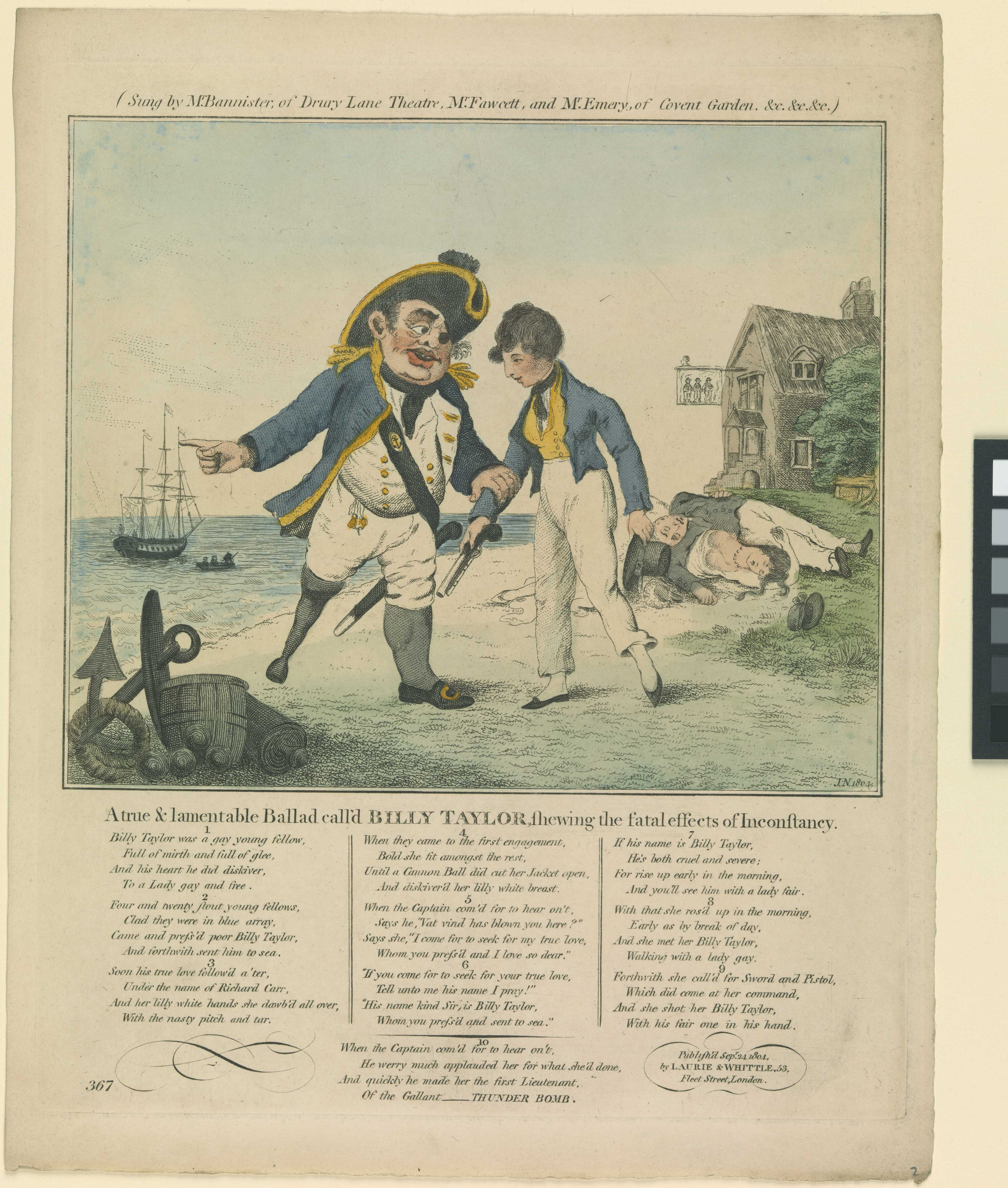
- A true and lamentable Ballad call'd Billy Taylor, shewing the fatal effects of inconstancy
- Catalogue: Roud 158, Laws N11
- Genre: Folk
- Published: 1792

"William Taylor" (Roud 158, Laws N11) is a British folk song, often collected from traditional singers in England, less so in Scotland, Ireland, Canada and the USA. It tells the story of a young woman who adopts male dress and becomes a sailor (or sometimes a soldier) in order to search for her lover. Other names include Billy Taylor, Brisk Young Seamen, Bold William Taylor, Down By the Seashore, The False Lover, The Female Lieutenant; Or, Faithless Lover Rewarded, If You'll Get Up Early in the Morning, The Life and Death of Billy Taylor, My Love, Poor William Taylor, Sally Brown and William Taylor, and Young Billy Taylor.

== Music ==
One tune is as follows:

== Story ==
=== Synopsis ===
Several versions exist, but the story of the song concerns a young couple due to be wed. On the morning of the wedding, the groom William Taylor (Billy in some versions) is pressed into service. The bride searches for him, disguising herself as a man to become a soldier or sailor. When her true sex is revealed (usually in an incident involving accidental exposure of her breasts), the captain points her in the direction of her beloved, but mentions that he now has a new suitor. When she finds him, she shoots him and sometimes also his new bride. In some versions, she is then rewarded by the captain with command of her own ship.

=== Details ===
Many versions follow a line similar to this. William Taylor, a "brisk young sailor" is at church about to be married when he is taken by the press gang:

William Taylor was a brisk young sailor
He who courted a lady fair
Bells were ringing, sailors singing
As to church they did repair.

Now forty couple were at the wedding,
All were dressed in rich array.
Instead of William getting married
He was pressed and sent away.

(or sometimes he merely enlists in the army, or joins a ship, with no wedding arrangements). His bride-to-be, sometimes called Sarah Dunn or Sally Grey, but often nameless, dresses in sailor's (or soldier's) clothing and goes to look for him. In some versions her true gender is revealed in battle or in some other way:

One day as she were exercising,
Exercising one, two, three,
A silver chain hung down her waistcoat
And exposed her lily-white breast.

in others her ship arrives at a foreign port where she resumes her true gender. Her captain asks why she has come, she tells him she is looking for William Taylor:

“If his name be William Taylor,
William Taylor is not here;
He's lately married a rich young lady,
Worth ten thousand pound a year.”

“If you rise early in the morning,
Just before the break of day,
Why there you'll find bold William Taylor,
A-walking out with his lady fair.”

She gets up before the dawn, sees William and his wife as predicted, calls for a pistol or pistols and sometimes a sword, and shoots him "with his fair lady by his side".

She's called for a brace of pistols,
That were brought at her command;,
Fired and shot her false Willie,
And the bride at his right hand.

The captain is so impressed he marries her, or makes her the commander of a ship or two.

And then the captain stepped up to her,
Was well pleased at what she'd done.
He took her and made her a bold commander
Over a ship and all his men.

== History ==
William Taylor was often performed as a comic song, Billy Taylor, in the 19th century, but seems to have originated as a serious ballad. Traditional singers seem to sing it straight.

=== Early printed examples ===
The earliest written example of the song "William Taylor" in the Sailing Master's log of Peter Pease circa 1770

The earliest known version is found in the logbook of Sailing Master Peter Pease, who commanded five separate vessels over 5 different Atlantic crossings between 1769 and 1772. The song was written in the log sometime in 1770, and referenced as "William Taylor, A Song in the year 1770". This version has 10 stanzas recorded over two pages of the logbook.

A later example is recorded as Billy Taylor, in a chapbook, Four New Songs, printed in 1792. The song was printed frequently by publishers of broadsides throughout England and in Scotland.

The earliest known version, as Billy Taylor, is in a chapbook, Four New Songs, printed in 1792. The song was printed frequently by publishers of broadsides throughout England and in Scotland.

=== Collecting history ===
The Roud Folk song Index lists about 103 versions from traditional singers, 56 - more than half - from England, 11 from Scotland, 3 from Ireland, 9 from Canada and 24 from the USA.

=== Field recordings ===
- At the suggestion of Percy Grainger the Gramophone Company recorded Lincolnshire singer Joseph Taylor singing this song on a wax cylinder in 1908. This recording has been re-released as part of the Voice of the People series and is available online via the British Library Sound Archive.
- Hamish Henderson recorded Aberdeenshire singer Willie Mathieson singing "Billy Taylor" in 1952. This recording is on the Tobar an Dualchais website.
- Samuel Preston Bayard recorded Charles S Brink singing Willie Taylor in Smicksburg Pennsylvania in 1948.

=== Recordings by revival singers and groups ===
Hedy West, John Faulkner and Sandra Kerr, Tony Rose, Dave Burland, Robin and Barry Dransfield, Martin Carthy, Frankie Armstrong, June Tabor and Martin Simpson, Swan Arcade, Jo Freya, Bram Taylor, Hen Party, Magpie Lane, Malinky, Patterson Jordan Dipper, The Cecil Sharp Centenary Collective, Jim Moray, Jon Boden, Hannah James and Sam Sweeney, Iona Fyfe, Alex Cumming and Nicola Beazley, The Voice Squad, Bardic, The Longest Johns, Bill Jones and Rosie Hood have all recorded versions of the song.

== In other media ==
- A version is performed by Sean Dagher at the taverns in the video game Assassin's Creed IV: Black Flag.
