= St Nicholas' Church, South Ferriby =

St Nicholas' Church
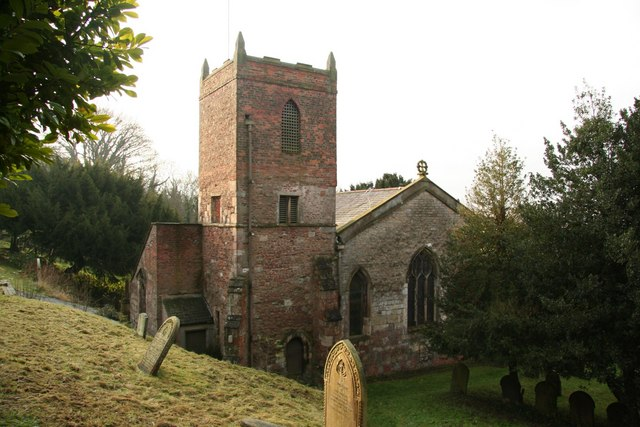
- St Nicholas' Church
- 53°40′29″N 0°30′19″W
- OS grid reference: SE 98845 20838
- Location: Middlegate Lane, South Ferriby, North Lincolnshire
- Country: England
- Denomination: Church of England

History
- Status: Church
- Founded: 13th century

Architecture
- Heritage designation: Grade II*
- Designated: 6 November 1967

St Nicholas' Church is an Anglican church and Grade II* listed building in South Ferriby, North Lincolnshire, England.

== History ==
The nave dates to at least the 13th century and the windows to the 14th-15th centuries. It was remodelled in the early 19th, which included the addition of the top part of the tower, and again in 1889 by C. Hodgson Fowler. A Romanesque tympanum has been incorporated into the porch and remains in situ above the door.

== Gallery ==
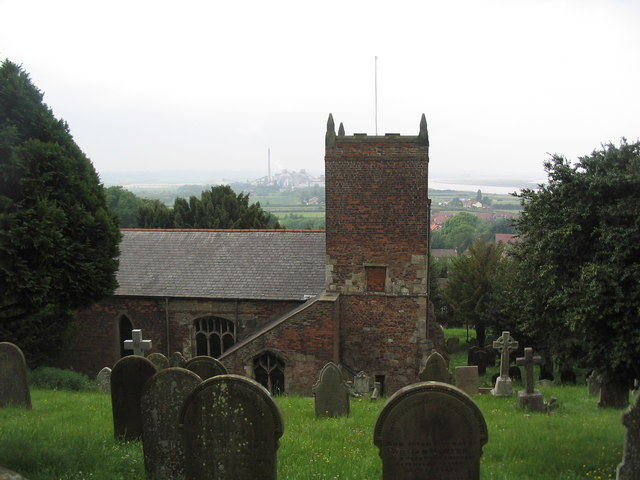

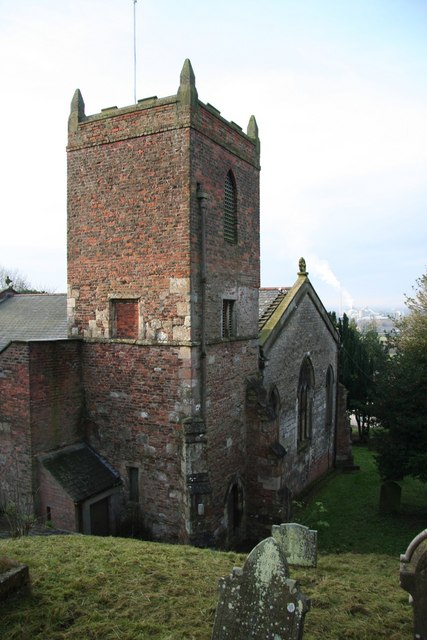

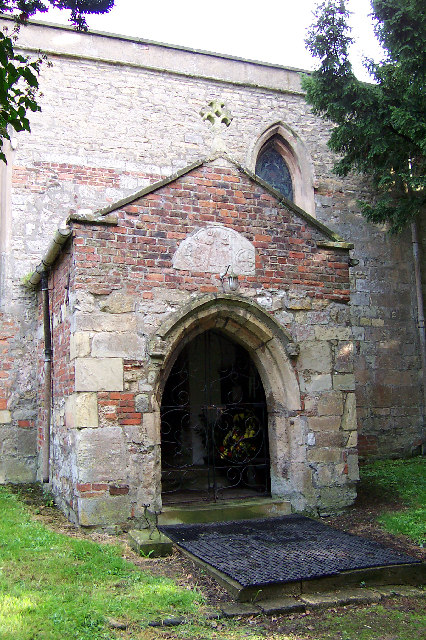

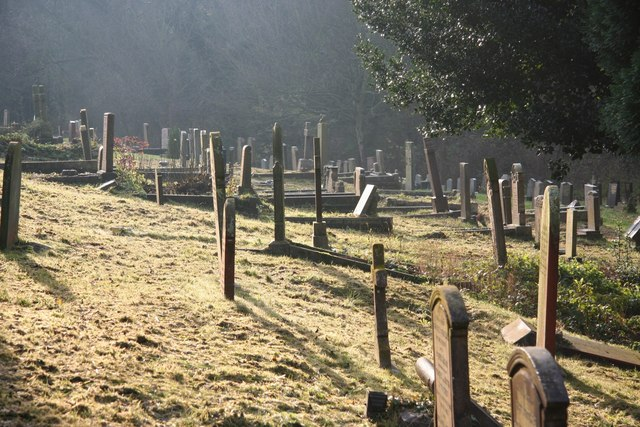
