= Read's Island =

Island in the Humber Estuary, England

Coordinates: 53.6825°N 0.5419°W

- Interactive map of Read's Island

Administration
- England
- County: Lincolnshire
- Civil Parish: Winteringham

Demographics
- Population: 0 (2011)

Read's Island
- Location within Lincolnshire
- OS grid reference: SE931221
- Unitary authority: North Lincolnshire
- Ceremonial county: Lincolnshire
- Region: Yorkshire and the Humber
- Country: England
- Sovereign state: United Kingdom
- Postcode district: DN15
- Police: Humberside
- Fire: Humberside
- Ambulance: East Midlands
- UK Parliament: Scunthorpe

Read's Island is an island situated just outside the Ancholme sluice, on the Humber Estuary in England. The Lincolnshire Trust suggest it is an artificial island, and a report from 1979 says that it was reclaimed. However, the site was for many years a large sandbank going by the name of "Old Warp" and is shown on the 1734 Customs Map of the Humber where Read's Island now lays, and extending further downstream.

A local history website about Barton-Upon-Humber indicates that both are true. It says that two wrecks, including one which locals deliberately scuttled, helped to form the island off South Ferriby. The scuttling was to protect the banks on the southern shore.

In 1872, it was described as being 300 acres, in 1886 it was 491 acres whilst in 2008 it was 200 acres. Flooding in 2007 left the island depleted of areas for avocets to breed, so a programme of rebuilding was instituted.

== History ==
The Imperial Gazetteer of England and Wales suggests that Read's Island was 'formed of Pudding-Pie sand' and that it 'took its name from Mr Read of Burton Stather'.

Grass was then seen growing on Old Warp by the end of the 18th century and cattle were put onto the island to graze. With the Humber Estuary being a drain for a large part of the Midlands, including the River Trent and all of its tributaries, and the River Ouse draining a major part of Yorkshire, England, and being very tidal, it was a simple task and a matter of waiting a few years for some strategically placed piles of bricks and concrete (Warping) to start off this island by allowing the rich silt to build up. It was certainly protected and further land reclaimed from the Humber as its island status grew, and by the 1861 census there was one wooden cottage on the island, with a fresh water well.

=== Military history ===
German prisoners of war rebuilt the brick flood walls during the 1914–1918 war and on the 21 May 1942, an Airspeed Oxford of No 15 PAFU from RAF Kirmington crashed into the east side of the island. On 24 December 1944, a V1 rocket crashed into the mud by Read's Island. It was part of a synchronized attack on Manchester by Heinkel He 111 aircraft. The rockets were launched from aircraft to improve their 150-mile (240 km) range.

=== Agriculture and human history ===
In 1871, the Humber Conservancy agreed to buy the island from the Crown Estate for a sum of £1434.4s.3d(equivalent to £935,000 in 2015) (Note: See external links for conversion websites.) and the land was rented out to the tenant farmers. The major part of Read's Island is in the parish of Winteringham despite the closest village being South Ferriby. It has been occupied at times in the past, at one point as a farm with cattle roaming along it, and when there are particularly high spring tides, at low water, it was possible for the cattle to reach solid ground by walking across the mud at low tide. In the 1930s cattle had to be transported by barge. The island then extended to some 600 acres (2.4 km^{2}) and was used for summer grazing. It was locally famous for wildlife and hares.

== Hydrometry ==
Historically, there is an approximate 20-year cycle whereby the main shipping channel alternates from just north of Read's Island to the South Channel, between the Island and the shoreline in South Ferriby and Winteringham parishes.

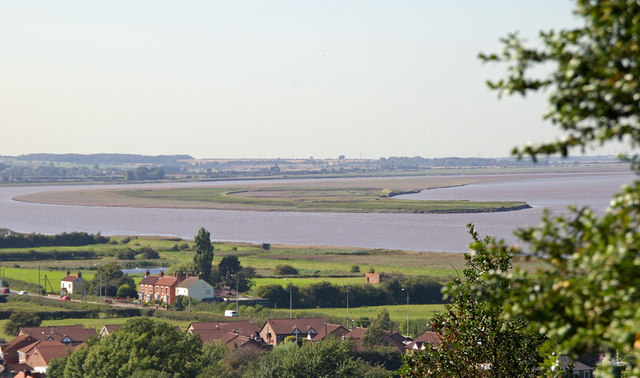
Read's Island looking north west. Taken from South Ferriby.

Currently, as the Humber continues to change, the island is in decline. Current thinking suggests that the main (undredged) shipping channel upstream will vary between the island and the north shore and the island and the Humber's Lincolnshire shore. This has been attributed to the flow of the freshwater coming down the estuary.

== Ecology ==
Read's Island is an RSPB reserve due to its importance for birdlife. Species that migrate or live year-round on the island include ground-nesting avocets (10% of the entire UK population), greylag goose, pink-footed goose, marsh harrier, lapwing, wigeon, curlew, golden plover and fallow deer.

== Toponymy confusion ==
Note that Read's Island is the spelling used by the Ordnance Survey and other maps, whilst some spell it Reads Island, and others even Reed's or Reeds Island. An ABPmer document even spells it as Reed's and Read's in the same paragraph. The Read brothers of Burton upon Stather are believed to be the first to graze cattle on the island.
