= Wrestling Empire =

2021 video game

- Developer: Mat Dickie
- Publisher: MDickie
- Platforms: iOS, Android, Nintendo Switch, Windows
- Release: January 11, 2021
- Genre: Sports

Wrestling Empire is a professional wrestling video game developed by Mat Dickie. Development began in 2019, and the game was released on January 11, 2021, for Nintendo Switch, iOS, Android, and Windows. This was the first MDickie game on Nintendo Switch.

== Gameplay ==
Wrestling Empire contains 350 different wrestlers and now contains wrestler parodies from the promotion All Elite Wrestling, and more custom made ones. Most of the WWE parodies have different names, for example, the fictional promotions in Wrestling Empire, Federation Online and All American Wrestling have parodies of WWE.

The predecessor of Wrestling Empire was Wrestling Revolution 3D in 2014, and the gameplay of both games are nearly identical, except that Wrestling Empire is on a new smoother and faster engine.

== Reception ==
Wrestling Empire

Review score
Publication	Score
Nintendo Life	6/10 stars

Chris Scullion from Nintendo Life gave Wrestling Empire a 6 star rating, stating that there were too many bugs in the game and compared it to Goat Simulator. Chris McMullen from Gamespew stated that Wrestling Empire is "wonky" and "low-budget fun" TheGamer ranked Wrestling Empire as number 5 in the Greatest Wrestling games on Nintendo Switch. A major criticism of Wrestling Empire is the graphics, which most journalists stated which was "low-budget" and "low-res".

== Development ==
The developer of Wrestling Empire, Mat Dickie, in late 2011 transitioned to mobile game development, which led to the release of Wrestling Revolution in 2012. In 2019, Dickie confirmed that a new wrestling project was in development for the Nintendo Switch and mobile devices. This project later emerged as Wrestling Empire, which was released on January 11, 2021.
