= Old Town Hall, Brigg =

Municipal building in Brigg, Lincolnshire, England

The Old Town Hall
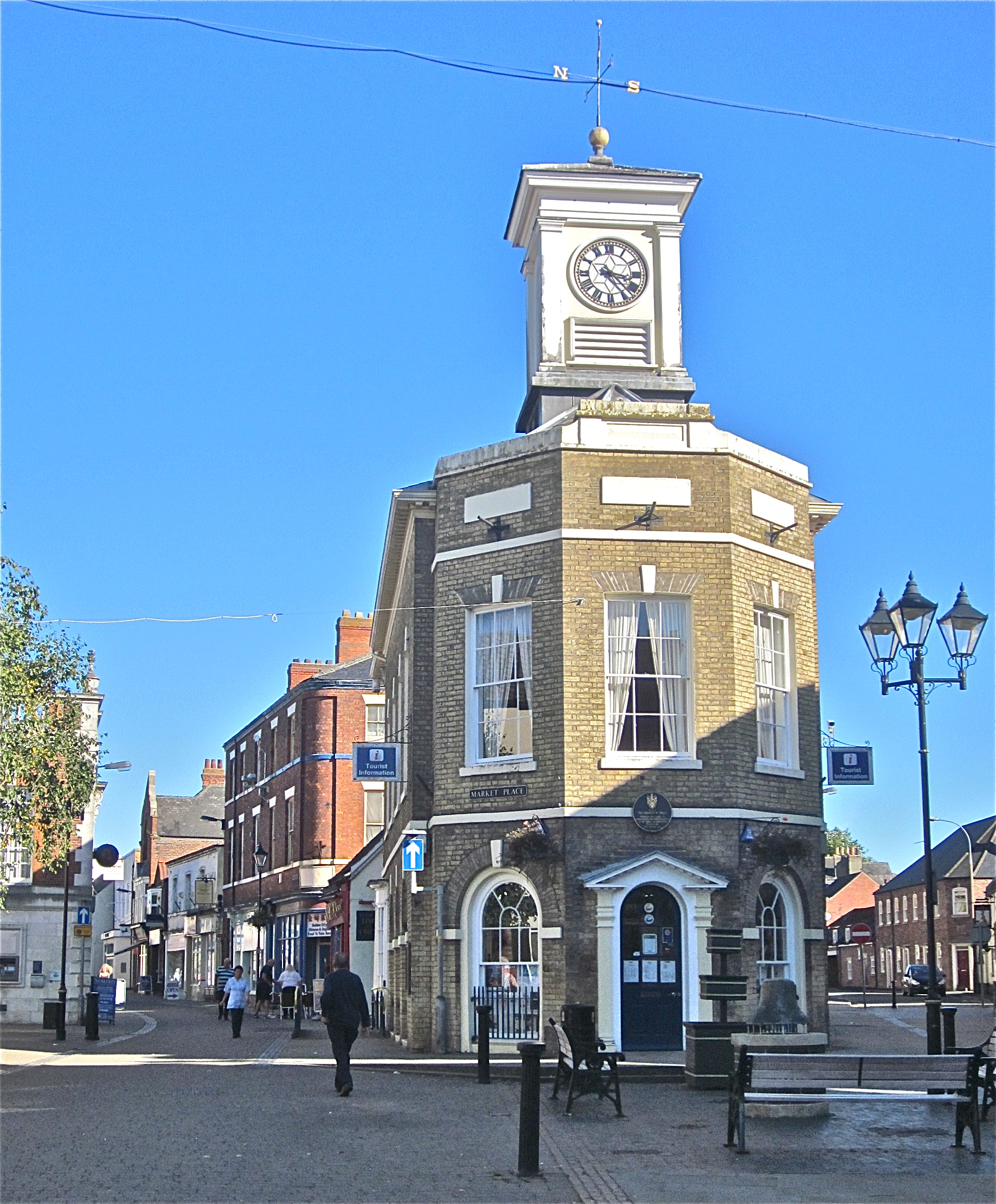
- The Old Town Hall, Brigg

- Shown in Lincolnshire
- 53.5520°N 0.4924°W
- Location: Market Place, Brigg

History
- Built: 1819

Site notes
- Architectural style: Neoclassical style

Listed Building – Grade II
- Official name: Town Hall
- Designated: 10 October 1952
- Reference no.: 1083130

The Old Town Hall, also known as the Buttercross, is a municipal building in the Market Place in Brigg, Lincolnshire, England. The Grade II listed building is used as a tourist information centre and as an events venue.

== History ==
The building was commissioned by two local land owners, Robert Cary Elwes of Great Billing Hall and Sir Henry Nelthorpe of Scawby Hall. It was financed by public subscription with contributions from solicitors, surgeons and businessmen. The site they selected was at the corner of Wrawby Street and Bigby Street and construction work started there in 1817. The building was designed in the neoclassical style, built in buff brick at a cost of circa £1,000 and was officially opened with a celebratory ball on 28 June 1819.

The design involved a symmetrical main frontage with three canted bays facing onto the east side of the Market Place; the building was originally arcaded, so that butter and poultry markets could be held, with an assembly room on the first floor. The first floor was fenestrated on the first floor by square headed windows with keystones. There were stucco bands above each floor and, above the upper band, there were blank panels in each bay. At roof level, there was a parapet and a wooden clock turret with a weather vane. The building extended back for five bays along each of the two streets. Internally, the principal room was the assembly room on the first floor which was used as a function room for civic meetings and dances.

In the 1870s, the civic leaders decided to enclose the ground floor: on the front elevation, a round headed doorway flanked by pilasters supporting a modillioned pediment was inserted in the opening in the central bay and round headed windows were inserted in the openings in the outer bays. On the Wrawby Street elevation, the opening in the first bay of the left was replaced by a doorway with a fanlight, which was flanked by fluted Doric order columns supporting an entablature, while the opening in the second bay on the left was replaced by a bay window. The function room on the first floor accommodated a Catholic primary school at that time.

Following a significant increase in population, mainly associated with the status of Brigg as a market town, the area became an urban district in 1894. The building was acquired by the new urban district council in the early 20th century, and apart from the Second World War when the building was requisitioned for military use, it continued to serve as the local seat of government until 1969, when the council moved to the new civic centre in Cary Lane. The building was subsequently occupied by the Brigg Operatic Society and then by the Trustee Savings Bank; it was comprehensively refurbished by Glanford Borough Council between 1989 and 1990 before being re-opened by the Princess of Wales as a tourist information centre in February 1991. Further improvements included the provision of digital displays in the tourist information centre so that visitors could be made aware of future local events.

The bell from the clock tower was restored by the local Rotary Club with financial support from the National Lottery Community Fund and placed on a specially designed plinth in front of the building in 2005. A programme of refurbishment works, which involved replacement of the timbers, external repainting and repairs to the weather vane, was carried out in September 2018. The works also included restoration work to the clock dials which was carried by Smith of Derby Group.
