= Mat Dickie =

English indie video game developer

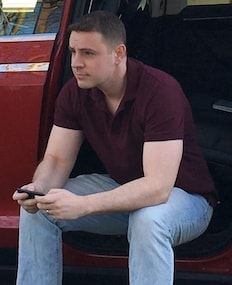
- Dickie in 2018
- Born: 1980 or 1981 (age 45–46); Brigg, North Lincolnshire, England
- Other name: MDickie
- Education: University of Salford (BSc)
- Occupation: Video game developer
- Years active: 2000–2009; 2012–present
- Notable work: Hard Time; Wrestling Revolution 3D; Wrestling Empire
- Website: www.mdickie.com

Mat Dickie (born 1980/1981), professionally known as MDickie, is an English independent video game developer. He is best known for his indie professional wrestling games, such as Wrestling Revolution for iOS and Android devices, which received over 100,000 downloads two months after its launch in 2012. The game later went on to surpass 10 million downloads and its sequel, Wrestling Revolution 3D, went on to compete with WWE 2K games on the mobile and PC market.

Dickie began his game development career in 2000 with his first PC game, going on to release several PC games before retiring in 2009 to become an educator. He came out of retirement in late 2011 and transitioned to mobile game development, which led to the release of Wrestling Revolution in 2012 among many other successful mobile games. He briefly retired from full-time game development in 2018 but returned in 2019 to announce a new wrestling project for the Nintendo Switch and mobile devices. This project later emerged as Wrestling Empire, which was released in early 2021.

Many of Dickie's games are infamous for their awkward controls and poor graphics. He has mentioned that the low resolution and low poly graphics in his games have allowed for better performance, in turn enabling him "to push a lot of boundaries". The indie and low budget nature of Dickie's games have often contributed to their popularity, leading to Dickie describing himself as being "single-handedly responsible for the worst games to ever be enjoyed by millions of people."

== Early life ==
Mat Dickie was born in Brigg, North Lincolnshire. His parents worked on a small newsstand, where he stayed while they worked, and boredom drove him to express his creativity by producing makeshift toys for himself with the materials available there. He attended Brigg Primary School and Franklin College in Grimsby. He became interested in developing games at an early age, often sketching out ideas for games. Some of his works were influenced by games he played as a child, including WWF No Mercy, Super Fire Pro Wrestling and WWF WrestleFest.

Dickie also tinkered with Deluxe Paint on his Commodore Amiga until he acquired a PC in 1998, which signalled the beginning of his game development career.

== Career ==
=== PC game development (2000–2009) ===
Dickie began creating his first game after he stumbled across a copy of DIV Game Studio, a programming language that promised to make game development easy. He purchased it from his local Woolworths branch, and spent the summer of 2000 learning it from the examples.

Dickie released his first game, Hardy Boyz Stunt Challenge, in August 2000. The game had the player play as one of the Hardy Boyz, who were wrestlers in the WWF (later renamed the WWE). The game took two weeks to complete and was posted on a wrestling website where it received 15,000 downloads and positive feedback, which inspired him to continue making video games and to make his own website in November 2000 to host his games. He moved to Manchester in 2001 to complete a Bachelor of Science in video games and computers at the University of Salford. In that same year, he released his first complete game, Federation Online, a flash-based wrestling game.

In 2006, Idigicon, who had previously published one of Dickie's games, Boxer's Story, contacted him again to make a version of his newest release, Wrestling Encore, for the British professional wrestling promotion One Pro Wrestling; however, legal complications arose due to 1PW not having the video game license to the American professional wrestlers working for them. In order to counteract this issue, 1PW attempted to buy the rights to the whole game off of Dickie instead of the rights to sell the version he had created for the promotion at their live shows, with the added benefit of him getting to meet the wrestlers working for the promotion at the time, including Bret Hart and Jeff Jarrett. Dickie declined this offer.

In 2007, Dickie created his first major non-wrestling game, Hard Time, a prison simulator which was named by Games for Windows Magazine as the "Indie Game of the Month". The game was almost released through a subsidiary of THQ. Dickie was also looking forward to develop his wrestling brand with them; however, they felt it was a conflict of interest.

Dickie released The You Testament in early 2009, a game loosely based on the New Testament in which the player follows the life and times of Jesus Christ and his various miracles. He developed it in three months, which PC Gamer said made it the "best worst game ever." After realizing that he was unable to meet the increasing expectations of gamers and critics, Dickie decided to retire from game development. He subsequently became a schoolteacher and developer of educational software, which he published on TES. Dickie had ambitions of enhancing learning and making learning fun; however, he later came to the conclusion that entertainment did not have much of a role to play in education. As of 2017, his educational resources have been used in 10,000 classrooms; he was also invited to the 2011 TES awards.

=== Mobile and console game development (2012–present) ===
In early 2012, Dickie was unemployed, about to buy his first home and awaiting the birth of his first child; this motivated him to come out of retirement and move to developing mobile games, releasing Wrestling Revolution as his first major mobile game. He also released several 2D remakes of his classic PC games on mobile, such as Popscene in 2014, Wrecked, and Hard Time in 2017. His most successful game to date, Wrestling Revolution 3D, reached 50 million downloads in 2017, becoming the first sports game on Google Play to do so.

In July 2018, Dickie once again announced his retirement from full-time game development, citing "frightening intolerance" from digital retailers among other reasons. In an interview, he also cited increasing demands from players after the release of AAA titles such as WWE 2K19. Dickie stated he did not wish to compete directly with WWE games, but intended to provide a "cheaper... lighter... [and] more creative alternative that's always going to be made by one man or a smaller team."

==== Wrestling Empire ====
In 2019, Dickie confirmed that a new wrestling project was in development for the Nintendo Switch and mobile devices. This project was later revealed to be Wrestling Empire, and was released on January 11, 2021. Dickie originally wanted the release to coincide with the 20th anniversary of the release of WWF No Mercy in 2020, which also marked his 20th year as a game developer; however, the COVID-19 pandemic led to him only being able to finish what he approximated to be a third of what he had planned for the game which lead to the project being delayed. Dickie thus decided to release Wrestling Empire in its unfinished state and add additional features through regular updates. The game has been described as reminiscent of wrestling games on the Nintendo 64, which Dickie drew inspiration from, specifically the era's focus on "gameplay over graphics", which he believes fit his priorities as an indie developer.

Chris Scullion of Nintendo Life gave the game a 6/10 rating, praising the amount of detail put into the large roster, customization options and career mode, while noting the game engine was "laughably prone to botches that you have to get into an equally unhinged mindset to enjoy it." Overall, he saw the game as "overwhelmingly impressive, especially [considering] it was created by a single person."

== Works ==
=== Ludography ===
Release	Title	PC	Mobile	Console	Notes
2000	Hardy Boyz Stunt Challenge	Yes			
2000	The Rock's Promo Cutter	Yes			
2000	Fat Bastards: Live On PPV	Yes			
2000	Case 3:16	Yes			
2000	Trent's Dirty Session	Yes			
2000	Con-chair-to	Yes			
2000	Fat Sow	Yes			
2000	THAT Love Triangle	Yes			
2000	Ian's Home Wrecking Challenge	Yes			
2000	Wrestling Vs Boxing	Yes			
2000	Sure Shot	Yes			
2000	Family Christmas	Yes			
2001	Big Bumps	Yes			Sequel to Hardy Boyz Stunt Challenge.
2001	Federation Online	Yes			
2001	Federation Online: September Edition	Yes			
2001	EEW's Total Annihilation	Yes			
2001	Big BumpZ	Yes			Made with DarkBASIC.
2001	CVG Strikes Back	Yes			
2002	Rocky	Yes			Repackaged as Boxer's Story and later renamed to Arcade Boxing and released by Idigicon.
2002	Sure Shot	Yes			
2002	Sure Shot: Star Wars Edition	Yes			
2002	Federation Wrestling	Yes			
2003	Big BumpZ	Yes			Made with Blitz3D.
2003	Federation Booker	Yes			
2003	The MDickie Show	Yes			
2004	Wrestling MPire 2004	Yes			
2004	Booking MPire 2004	Yes			
2004	Popscene	Yes			
2004	Sure Shot 3D	Yes			
2005	Wrecked	Yes			
2005	Popcorn	Yes			
2005	Wrestling Encore	Yes			
2006	Booking Encore	Yes			
2006	Grass Roots	Yes			
2006	World War Alpha	Yes			
2006	Talksport: Clash Of The Titans	Yes			
2007	Hard Time	Yes			
2007	Reach	Yes			
2008	Wrestling MPire 2008: Career Edition	Yes			
2008	Wrestling MPire 2008: Management Edition	Yes			
2008	Popscene: Track 2	Yes			
2008	The You Testament	Yes			
2010	Moksha	Yes	iOS, Android		
2010	The Making Of A Prophet	Yes			
2011	Under Development	Yes			
2011	Wrestling Mpire Remix Career Edition	Yes			
2011	Wrestling Mpire Remix Management Edition	Yes			
2011	CM Punk's Promo Cutter	Yes			
2012	Flash Stuntz	Yes	iOS, Android		
2012	Sure Shot	Yes	iOS, Android		Released as Sure Shot: Reloaded on the iOS App Store.
2012	Wrestling Revolution	Yes	iOS, Android		
2013	Booking Revolution		iOS, Android		This game was later merged into Wrestling Revolution.
2013	Hard Time	Yes	iOS, Android		
2014	Popscene		iOS, Android		
2014	Wrestling Revolution 3D	Yes	iOS, Android		
2015	School Days	Yes	iOS, Android		
2015	Weekend Warriors MMA	Yes	iOS, Android		
2016	Super City	Yes	iOS, Android		
2017	Wrecked		iOS, Android		
2017	Extra Lives	Yes	iOS, Android		
2018	Back Wars	Yes	iOS, Android		
2018	The You Testament: The 2D Coming	Yes	iOS, Android		
2021	Wrestling Empire	Yes	iOS, Android	Nintendo Switch	Made with the Unity game engine.
2023	Old School	Yes	iOS, Android	Nintendo Switch	
2024	Hard Time III	Yes	iOS, Android	Nintendo Switch	
2025	Infinite Lives	Yes	iOS, Android	Nintendo Switch	

=== Bibliography ===
- Inspiration for the Interactive Generation (2009, ISBN 1441414983)
- Sportuality (2009, ISBN 0956160913)
- A-fear-ism: The Ignorance Of Atheism (2010, ISBN 1449978347)
