= Charles Gore (artist) =

British artist

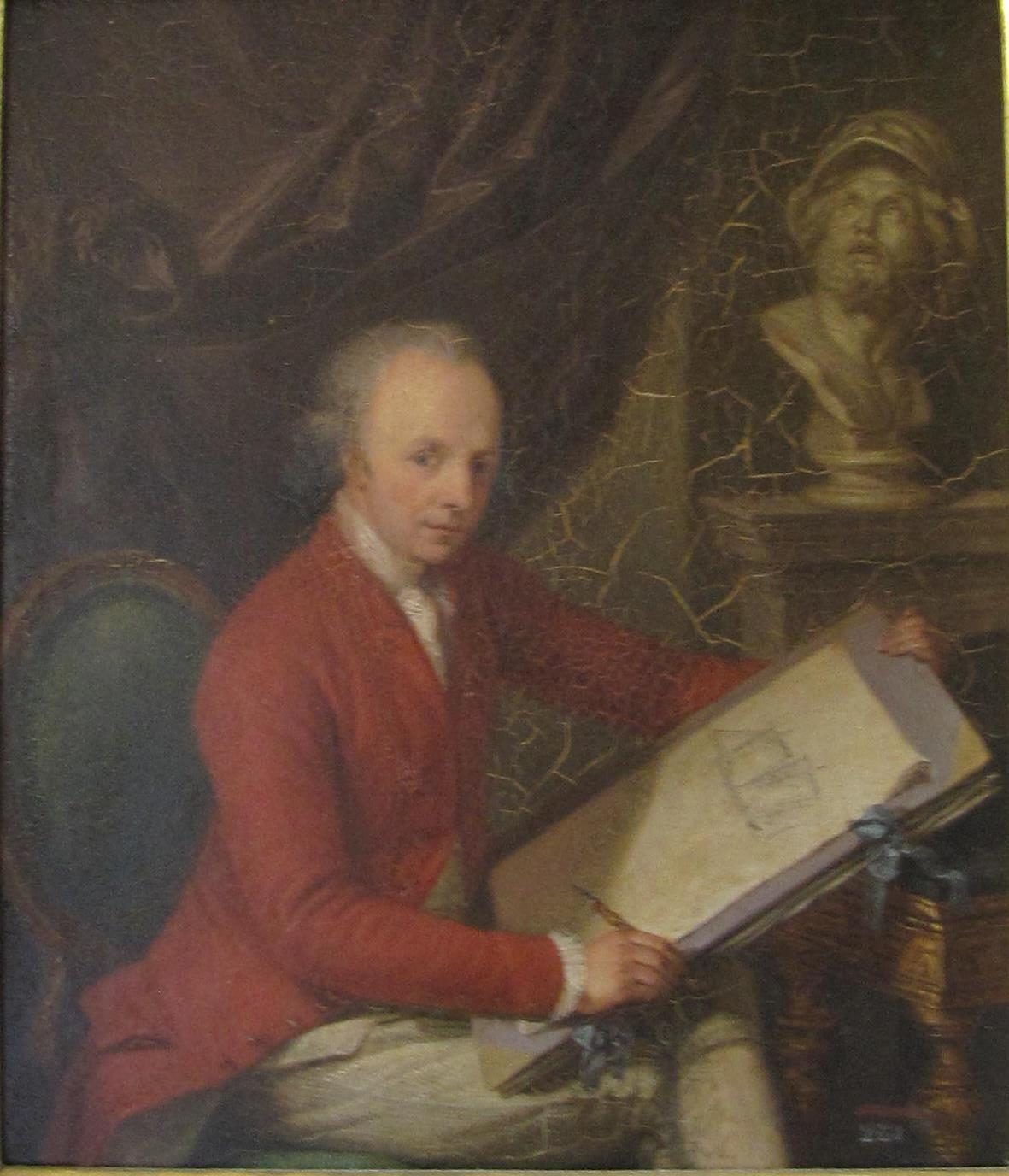
- Gore by Ludwig Guttenbrunn
- Born: 5 December 1729; Horkstow, Lincolnshire
- Died: 23 January 1807 (aged 77); Weimar
- Education: Westminster School
- Spouse: Mary (born Cockerill)
- Relatives: George Clavering-Cowper, 3rd Earl Cowper (son-in-law)

Charles Gore (5 December 1729 – 23 January 1807) was an English marine artist. He married well and travelled throughout Europe and knew royalty, Goethe and the artist Johann Zoffany. He settled and died in Germany.

== Life ==
Gore was born in Horkstow Hall in Horkstow in North Lincolnshire in 1729.

He attended Westminster School before working with his father's brother in a London trading company. In 1751 he married Mary (born Cockerill), whose wealth meant that Gore did not need to work again. After his father died he moved with his family in 1759 to Southampton, where he spent many days creating watercolours of naval scenes at the Portsmouth shipyards. He designed his own cutter, which he named Snail when she was launched. His social circle included the Duke of York, the Duke of Gloucester and the Duke of Cumberland, who were all brothers of King George III.

He toured Europe where he was influenced by the Old Duch Masters. He painted for some time with Jacob Philipp Hackert and they sketched together. He developed his own style with marine subjects but he was also known to complete the drawings of other artists and to copy other artist's paintings.

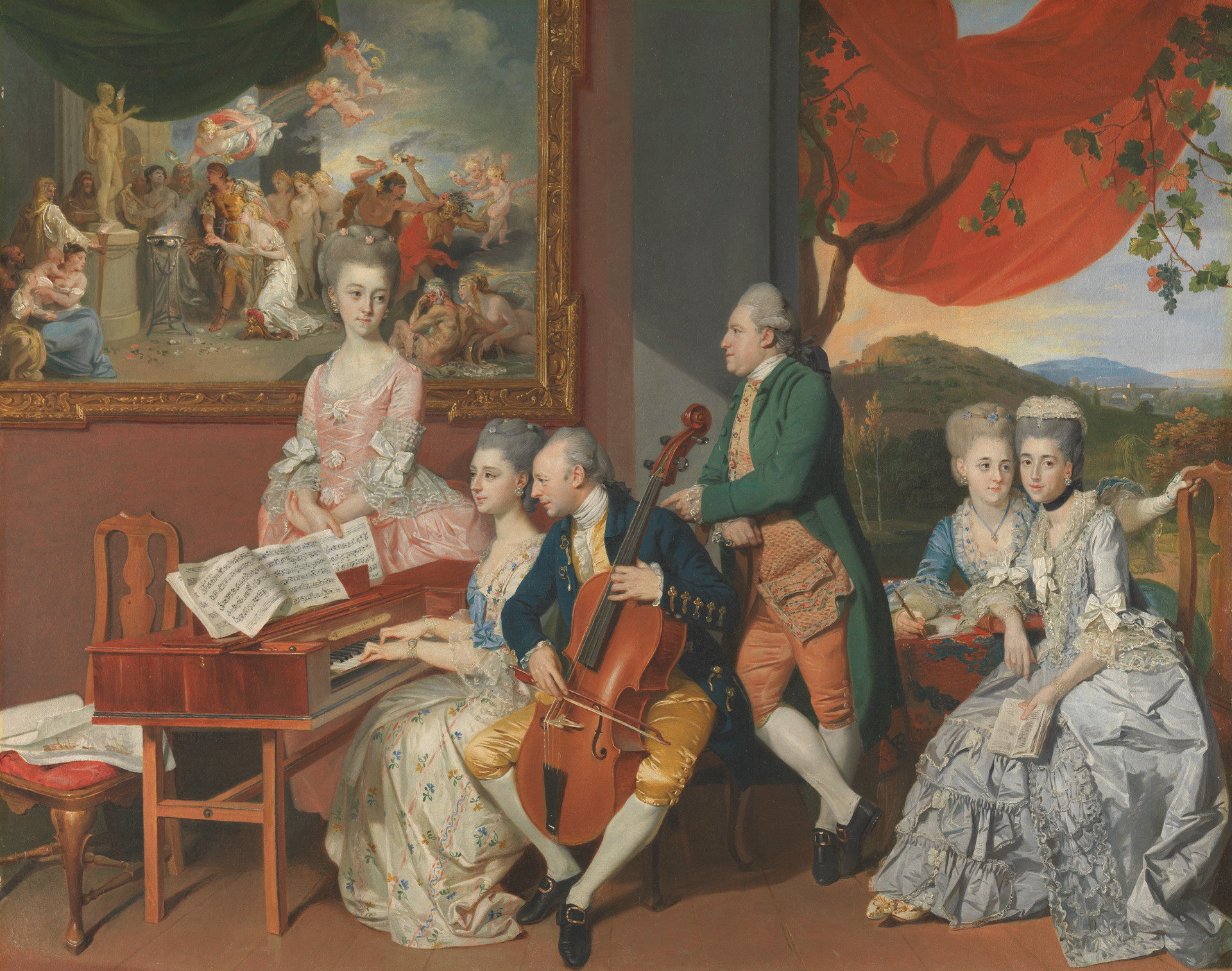
Hannah is top left and the prospective groom is the standing figure on the right

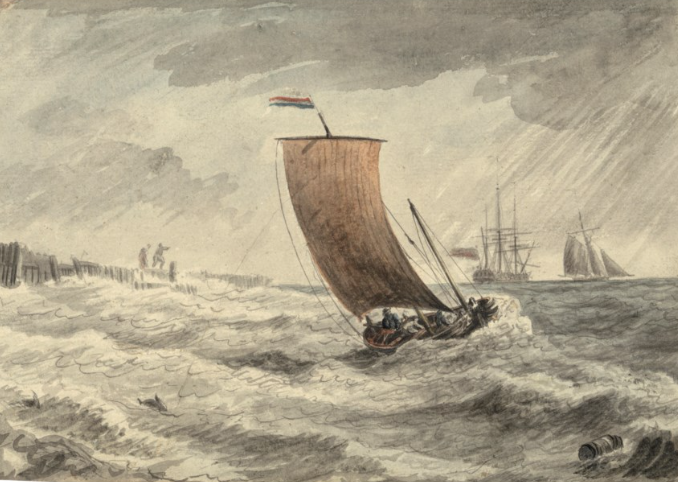
"Shipping, with dolphins, a squall approaching" by Charles Gore

In 1775 George Clavering-Cowper, the presumptive 3rd Earl Cowper married Gore's sixteen-year-old daughter Hannah Anne Gore on 2 June. Their betrothal was commemorated with a painting by Johann Zoffany, commissioned by Gore. In 1780, his daughter went on to live in the Villa Palmieri in Fiesole and to have three children, two of whom became earls.

His daughter Elizabeth Gore married Rev. Henry Wood D.D (Cambridge), son of Francis Wood JP. of Monk Bretton, Yorkshire, and brother of Sir Francis Wood and of Sir Charles Wood.

"A widely travelled, cultured gentleman with artistic tastes", Gore settled in Weimar in 1792, "presumably at the instance of Karl August who had fallen in love with the second daughter, and Goethe was a constant visitor at their house". He died there in 1807.
