= Brigg Fair =

Traditional song

"Brigg Fair" is a traditional English folk song sung by the Lincolnshire singer Joseph Taylor. The song, which is named after a historical fair in Brigg, Lincolnshire, was collected and recorded on wax cylinder by the composer and folk song collector Percy Grainger. It is known for its use in classical music, both in a choral arrangement by Grainger and a subsequent set of orchestral variations by Frederick Delius.

== The original song ==
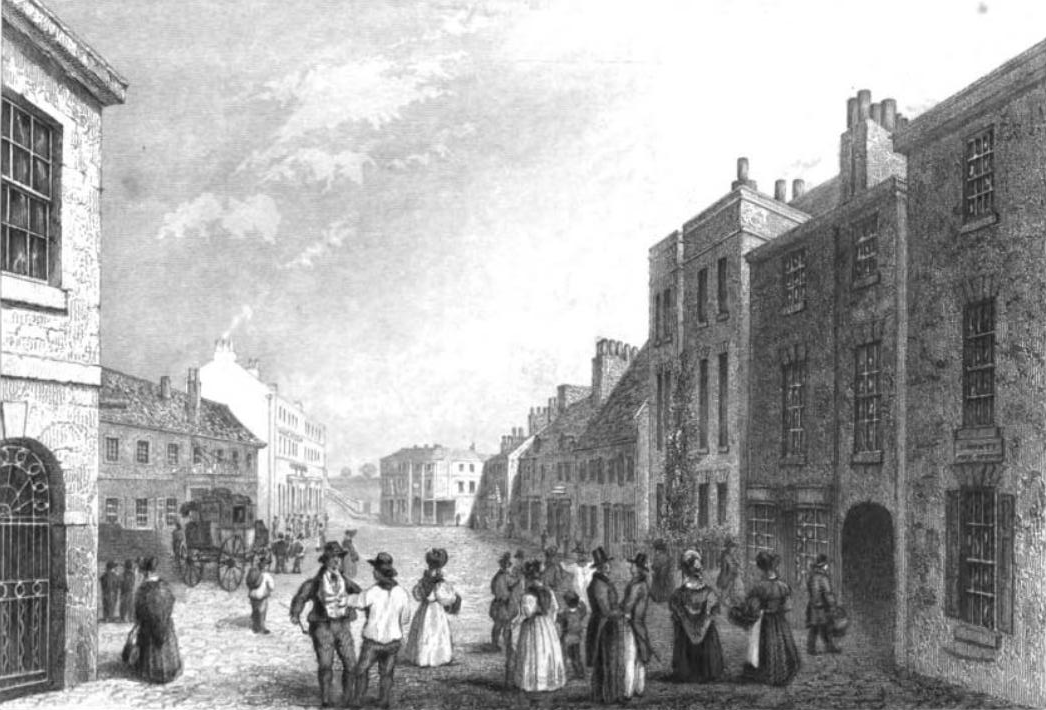
Brigg Marketplace, 1836

The song, which is listed as Roud 1083, has only been collected from members of Joseph Taylor's family, as well as a Mr. Deene of Brigg. Joseph Taylor learnt "Brigg Fair" from gypsies camped near Brigg sometime around the year 1850. Initially, he spied on them from afar as they sat around their campfire singing, but the King of the Gypsies invited him in and taught him the song.

In 1907, Percy Grainger recorded Joseph Taylor singing "Brigg Fair" shortly after a music festival in Brigg, North Lincolnshire. The recording survives and is commercially available; it was digitised by the British Library and made available online in 2018.

Taylor knew only two verses of what can be assumed to be a longer song:

It was on the fifth of August,
The weather hot and fair,
Unto Brigg Fair I did repair,
For love I was inclined.

I got up with the lark in the morning
With my heart so full of glee,
Expecting there to meet my dear,
Long time I wished to see.

== The fair ==
Brigg Fair is an annual event which has been held in the English market town of Brigg, North Lincolnshire, every year since 1205, It is held on August 5, unless that date falls on a Sunday, in which case the market is held on the preceding day. It is primarily an event at which horses and were bought and sold, together with horse-related products. It is now mostly organised by the travelling community.

== Grainger's choral setting ==
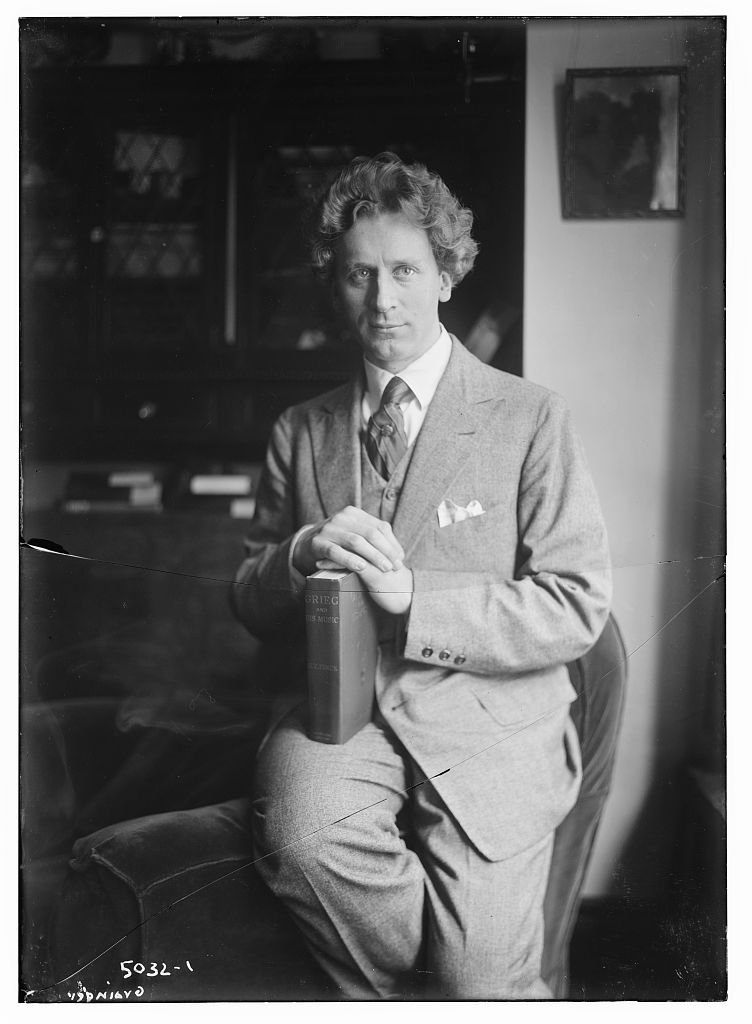
Percy Grainger, 1919

Grainger soon made an arrangement of the song for unaccompanied five-part chorus with a tenor soloist. The original song was short, since Taylor could remember only two stanzas, and Grainger added three stanzas taken from two other songs, "Low Down in the Broom" and "The Merry King". The tune, in the Dorian mode, is wistful, and the lyric is a happy one about true love.

The song has appeared in several different versions, including one set down by Taylor and members of his family. These are the words set by Grainger:

It was on the fifth of August-er' the weather fine and fair,
Unto Brigg Fair I did repair, for love I was inclined.

I rose up with the lark in the morning, with my heart so full of glee,
Of thinking there to meet my dear, long time I'd wished to see.

I took hold of her lily-white hand, O and merrily was her heart:
"And now we're met together, I hope we ne'er shall part".

For it's meeting is a pleasure, and parting is a grief,
But an unconstant lover is worse than any thief.

The green leaves they shall wither and the branches they shall die
If ever I prove false to her, to the girl that loves me.

The last three verses were collected by Grainger from two different songs found in different locations. Grainger added the extra verses to "complete" Taylor's original first two verses. Descendants of Taylor, including his daughter Mary, falsely believed that Taylor sang all five verses.

== Delius's orchestral setting ==
Delius heard Grainger's setting, and was impressed by both the tune and the arrangement. With Grainger's permission, he used the song as the basis of an orchestral work, first performed in 1908. After a pastoral introduction Grainger's setting is replicated by the woodwinds. A succession of variations on the original tune leads to a joyous finale.

Joseph Taylor was a guest at the first performance. While there is a popular story that he stood up and sang along, this legend was denied by Taylor's grand-daughter, Marion Hudson.

=== Instrumentation ===
3 flutes, 2 oboes, cor anglais, 3 clarinets, bass clarinet, 3 bassoons, contrabassoon, 6 horns, 3 trumpets, 3 trombones, tuba, timpani, percussion (bass drum, triangle, tubular bells), harp, and strings
