= Brigg =

Market town in North Lincolnshire, England

Coordinates: 53.5529°N 0.4850°W

- Town and civil parish
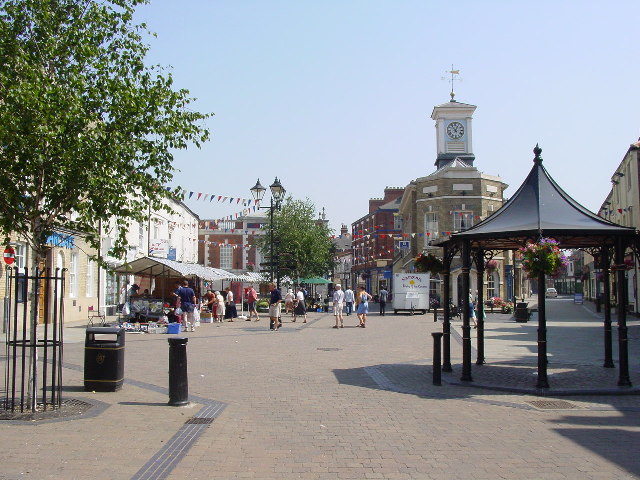
- Market Place

- Location within Lincolnshire
- Interactive map showing the parish boundary
- Population: 5,636 (2021 census)
- OS grid reference: TA003073
  - London: 140 mi (230 km) S
- Civil parish: Brigg
- Unitary authority: North Lincolnshire
- Ceremonial county: Lincolnshire
- Region: Yorkshire and the Humber
- Country: England
- Sovereign state: United Kingdom
- Post town: Brigg
- Postcode district: DN20
- Dialling code: 01652
- Police: Humberside
- Fire: Humberside
- Ambulance: East Midlands
- UK Parliament: Brigg and Immingham
- Website: Brigg Town Council

Brigg (/'brɪg/) is a market town and civil parish in the North Lincolnshire district, in Lincolnshire, England, with a population of 5,636 at the 2021 census. The town lies at the junction of the River Ancholme and east–west transport routes across northern Lincolnshire. As a formerly important local centre, the town's full name of Glanford Brigg is reflected in the surrounding area and former local government district of the same name. The town's urban area includes the neighbouring hamlet of Scawby Brook.

== History ==
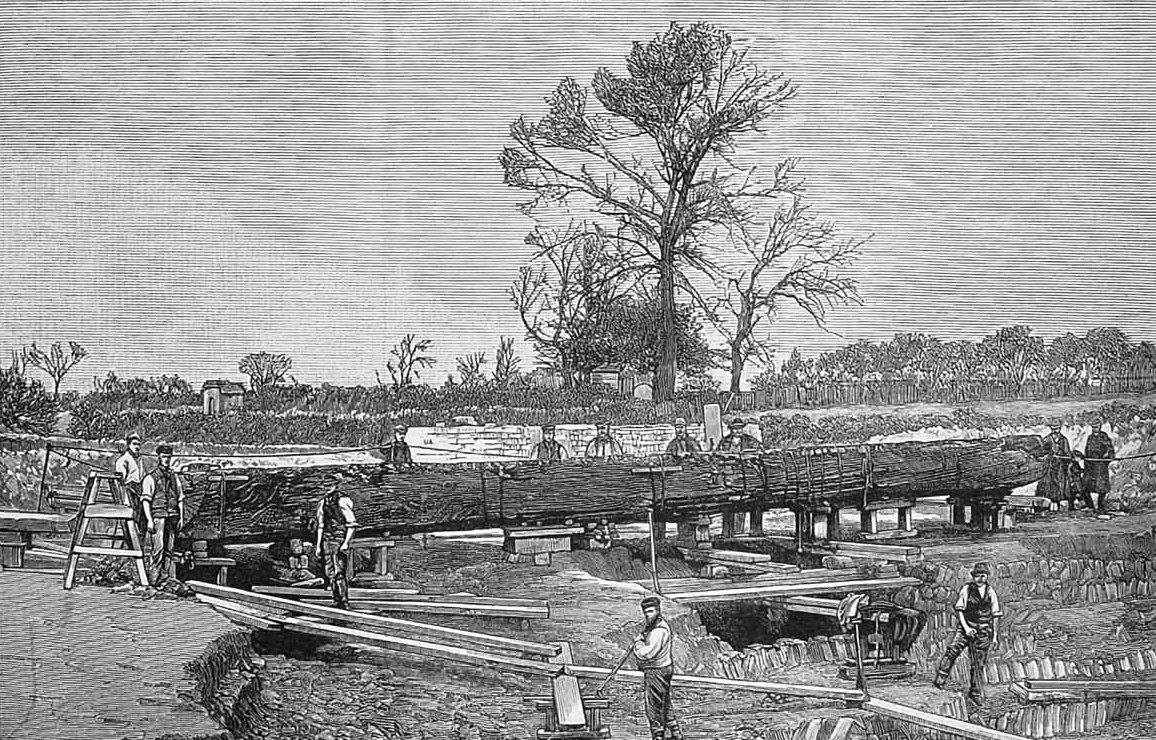
Discovery of Iron Age dugout in 1886.

The area of present-day Brigg has been used for thousands of years as both a crossing point of the Ancholme and for access to the river itself. Prehistoric boats of sewn–built and dugout construction have been found in the town, both dating to around 900 BC. A causeway or jetty also stood on the riverside during the late Bronze Age, although its exact use is uncertain.

During the Anglo-Saxon period the area became known as Glanford. The second element of the name is not disputed, but the origin of the first element is unclear. It is possibly derived from the Old English gleam meaning joy or revelry, and thus the full word is interpreted as "ford where sports are held". Another suggestion is that the first element refers to a 'glamping' track—a walkway formed by placing interlocking planks or logs over boggy ground—and thus describes a ford crossed in this manner. A third possibility is that it means "smooth ford" although its etymology is not specified.

Glanford Brigg was founded at the crossing place of the Ancholme before 1183, its first mention being a Pipe roll entry for that year. The town's formal charter for a weekly market and yearly fair date from a royal grant to Hugh Nevil in 1205, in which the founder's name is given as his father–in–law Stephen de Camera. The fair began on 25 July—the Feast of Saint James—and continued for three days afterward. The grant of a market and fair were subsequently reconfirmed to Hugh's son Ernisius in 1235. The second part of the town's full name dates to this time, coming from the new bridge built to replace the existing ford across the river. Its non-standard form of Brigg is due to influence from Old Norse bryggja, which although usually describes a jetty or quay here refers to a bridge. The name of a place spelt "Glawemfordbrigge" in Lincolnshire, appears in 1418.

Brigg originally sat at the meeting point of four parishes (Broughton, Kettleby, Scawby and Wrawby), although it lay mainly in the last, and was officially regarded as part of that village. In the 1190s, the lord of the manor of Broughton, Adam Paynel, founded a hospital for the poor within the town. Several small chapels also existed during medieval times, with another hospital and chapel founded by William Tyrwhitt in 1441. However, the dissolution of the monasteries in 1536–41 also affected hospitals and chapels, leaving the town without ecclesiastical coverage except the parish church in nearby Wrawby.

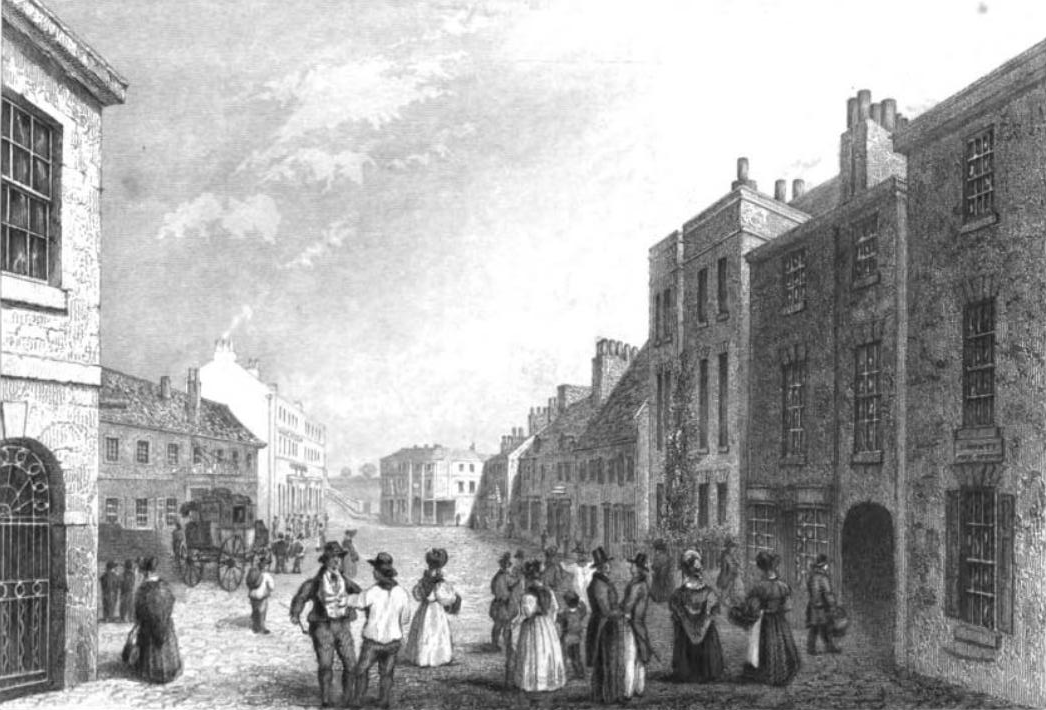
Brigg Marketplace in 1836

Due to its strategic position, Brigg was fortified by Royalist forces during the civil war. After the Battle of Winceby in 1643, Parliamentarian forces attacked and seized the garrison on their way to help relieve the siege of Hull. Sir John Nelthorpe, a local landowner who had been a member of Parliament during the Protectorate, bequeathed some of his estate in 1669 for the foundation and maintenance of a free school in the town. Four other local gentlemen established a chapel of ease in Bigby Street in 1699, restoring church presence in the town after 150 years of absence.

The town was substantially improved and rebuilt in the late 1700s and early 1800s, partly through the demands of the Elwes family, the largest landowner in the town. The old town hall—now known as the Buttercross—was built in 1817. Later, in 1842–43, the existing chapel of ease was replaced by a full–sized church dedicated to St John the Evangelist, and a cemetery was established on Wrawby Road in 1857, following significant controversy over the burial of non–conformists. Brigg's ecclesiastical parish was established in 1872, finally separating the town from Wrawby, but also incorporating neighbouring parts of Scawby, Broughton, and Bigby parishes.

A workhouse was built at the east end of the town in 1835, and was the responsibility of the Glanford Brigg Poor Law Union. Its architect was William Adams Nicholson who also designed the similar building in Lincoln, and replaced an earlier alms house dating back to 1701. The workhouse at Brigg is one of the best known and best documented of its type, probably because of the national interest that arose after Percy Grainger collected traditional songs from the inmates. An infirmary was later built attached to the workhouse, and this portion remained open as a hospital until 1991.

== Governance ==
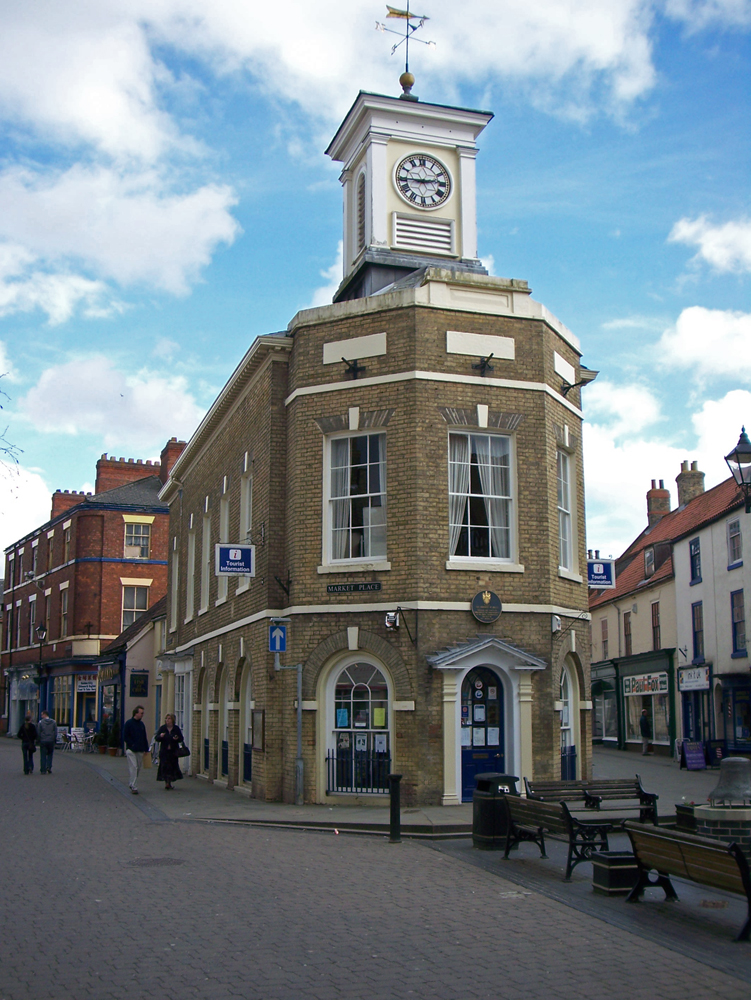
The Old Town Hall

Brigg lies within the unitary authority of North Lincolnshire, the majority of the town being within the Brigg and Wolds electoral ward, and represented by three councillors. The town also has a civil parish governed by Brigg Town Council. The council has nineteen members, serving four year terms. However, part of the town's urban area lies in Scawby Brook, which is split between the civil parishes of Scawby and Broughton. The area is likewise split between Ridge ward and Broughton & Appleby wards within North Lincolnshire Council. There is no joint body that covers Brigg and Scawby Brook.

Historically, the town was part of the county of Lincolnshire, and remains part of the ceremonial county today. Within Lincolnshire, the town was mostly in the wapentake of Yarborough in the North Riding of Lindsey. Local government in the town began with the establishment of a local government board in 1864, which was replaced with an urban district in 1894. On the creation of Humberside in 1974, the town's urban district was merged with the surrounding rural district to create Glanford borough, named after the town which was at its centre. The dissolution of Humberside in 1996 saw the town transferred to North Lincolnshire.

Brigg is part of the Brigg and Immingham parliamentary constituency, and is represented by Martin Vickers of the Conservative Party.

== Geography ==
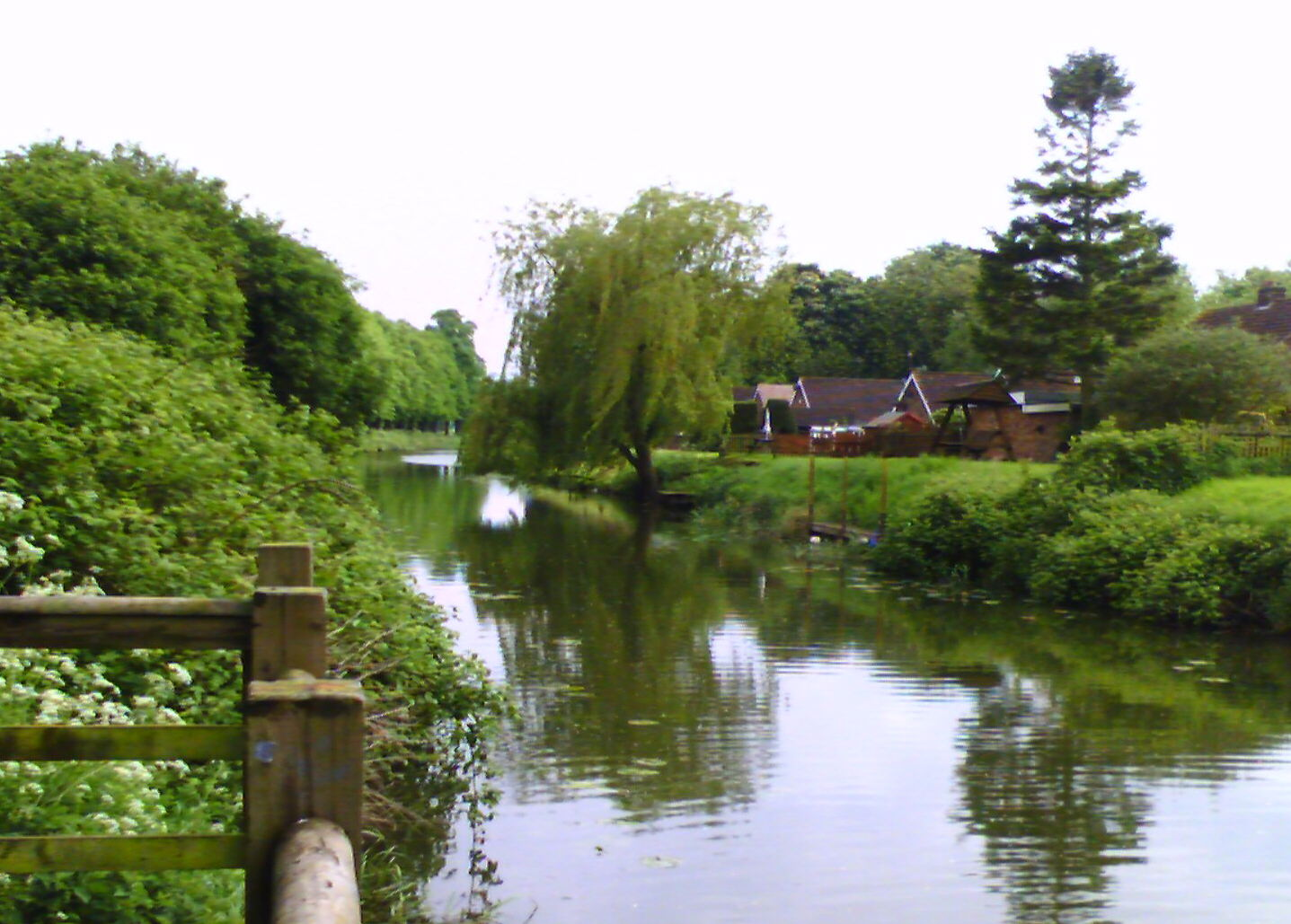
The Old River Ancholme in Brigg

Brigg

Climate chart (precipitation, max. and min. temperature)
| J | F | M | A | M | J | J | A | S | O | N | D |
| 48 6 1 | 38 6 1 | 48 9 2 | 48 11 4 | 51 15 7 | 53 18 10 | 53 20 11 | 64 20 11 | 48 18 10 | 48 14 7 | 56 9 3 | 53 7 1 |
- █ Average max. and min. temperatures in °C
- █ Precipitation totals in mm
- Source: Intellicast
Imperial conversion
| J | F | M | A | M | J | J | A | S | O | N | D |
| 1.9 43 34 | 1.5 43 34 | 1.9 48 36 | 1.9 52 39 | 2 59 45 | 2.1 64 50 | 2.1 68 52 | 2.5 68 52 | 1.9 64 50 | 1.9 57 45 | 2.2 48 37 | 2.1 45 34 |
- █ Average max. and min. temperatures in °F
- █ Precipitation totals in inches

Brigg is roughly 140 miles (230 km) directly north of London. The nearest big towns are Lincoln 22 miles (35 km) to the south, Scunthorpe 6.8 miles (11 km) to the west, Grimsby 17 miles (27 km) to the east, and Hull 14.6 miles (23.5 km) to the north. The local area is broadly the south bank of the Humber estuary.

The town itself sits on a gravel spur of the Lincolnshire Wolds that juts out into the valley of the Ancholme—a tributary of the Humber—which historically provided a narrow crossing point of the river and its flood plain. The Wolds proper rise to the east, reaching a maximum of roughly 330 feet (100 m) about 3.1 miles (5 km) from the town, although with a lower pass at the Kirmington Gap. To the west the land gently slopes up to roughly 230 feet (70 m) on the Lincolnshire Edge about 3.1 miles (5 km) away.

Between these low ranges of hills the Ancholme river runs south to north through its flat, low–lying flood plain, with a north–south height difference of only a few metres. The town sits on alluvial soils of the Ancholme, and the area surrounding the town was previously a semi–flooded marsh known as carrs. A series of drainage improvements from the 1630s to the 1820s transformed the whole of the valley into arable land. The largest of the drainage channels is also a canal known as the New River Ancholme. The original course of the river has been obliterated in places by the drainage works, but its discontinuous surviving length is known as the Old River Ancholme.

The town itself lies mostly on the east bank of the old river, with a small amount to the west. A portion of the west bank is cut off from the rest by the new river, forming an island–like piece of land known as Island Carr. Due to nearness of the river, the town regularly suffers minor flooding, and concerns over flood plain development are a major issue in local planning. The only other watercourse of reasonable size is Candley Beck, which runs through the very southern parts of the town. There are also about half a dozen clayponds along the riverside in Brigg where clay was formerly extracted for brick–making.

=== Townscape ===
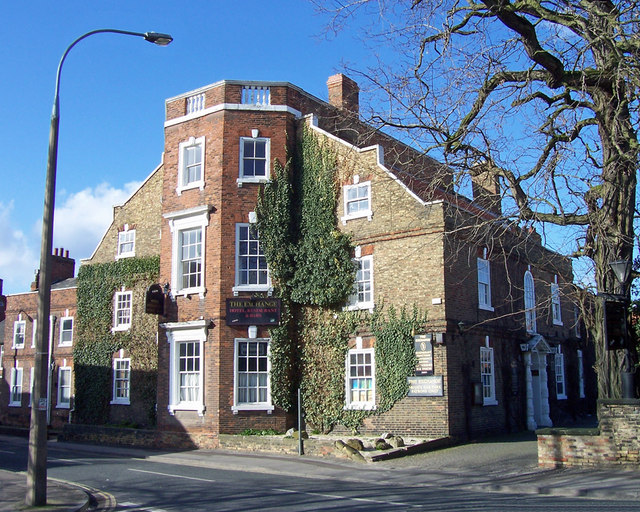
The Exchange in Bigby Street is the town's only grade II* listed building.

The old town is centred on the marketplace and the adjoining streets of Bridge Street, Wrawby Street, and Bigby Street. The marketplace and Wrawby Street, where much of the town's retail is located, were pedestrianized in the early 1990s. A significant number of buildings in the town centre date to the late 1700s or early 1800s and are listed, with the old town as a whole designated a conservation area. The marketplace is dominated by the Buttercross and the Angel, a former coaching inn with an early mock Tudor façade, which is now home to Brigg Town Council and various North Lincolnshire Council services. Another former coaching inn, the Exchange, stands in Bigby Street, opposite the former manor house of the Elwes family. The Anglican church of Saint John the Evangelist, built in 1843, also lies on Bigby Street. Its style is of the Gothic Revival architecture popular at the time, but Pevsner notes the curious construction where the stone has first been carved into the shape of bricks before being laid in courses.

Much of the town's poorer housing formerly lay in a series of narrow yards that ran northward from the marketplace and Wrawby Street. The yards were considered unsanitary slums by the late 1800s, but the housing was not finally vacated and demolished until the 1950s. However, the yards themselves remain in use, with the larger ones repurposed for retail and services, and the smaller for public passageways.

The A18 bisects the town, running just north of the town centre. To the north and east of this road, housing development throughout the 1900s expanded the town significantly in size. To the west beyond the New River Ancholme, the town's urban area continues into the neighbouring hamlet of Scawby Brook. The settlement is substantially bounded by the M180 motorway to the north and the Grimsby branch of the Sheffield to Lincoln railway line to the south.

== Demographics ==
At the 2021 census, Brigg civil parish had a population of 5,636 people in 2,547 households.

Census population of Brigg parish
| Census | Population | Female | Male | Households | Source |
|---|---|---|---|---|---|
| 2001 | 5,076 | 2,633 | 2,443 | 2,213 | |
| 2011 | 5,626 | 2,874 | 2,752 | 2,477 | |
| 2021 | 5,636 | 2,880 | 2,756 | 2,547 | |

== Economy ==
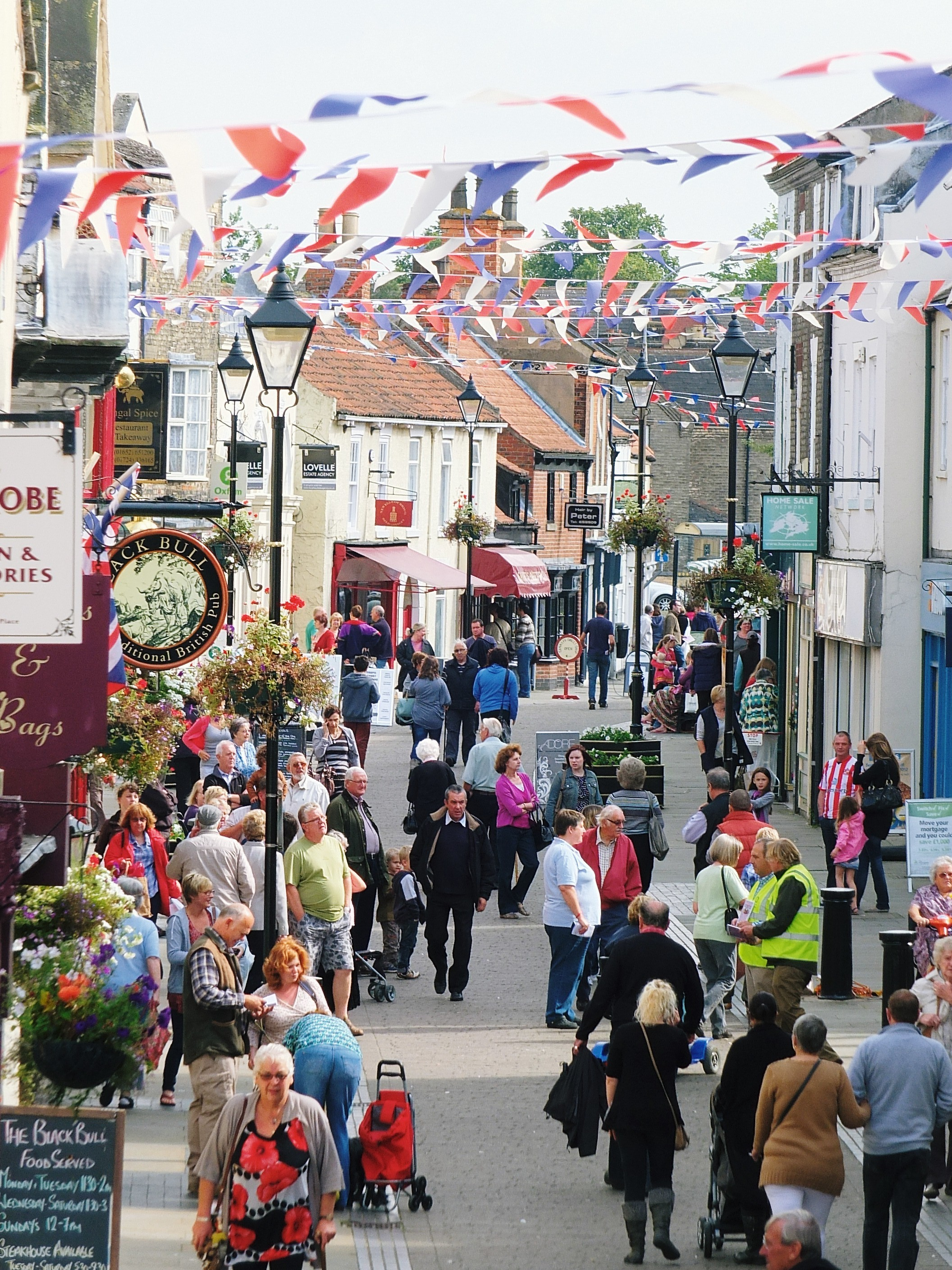
Wrawby Street, the main retail area

The economy of Brigg is substantially retail and service based, according with its traditional position of a market town, and acts as a service centre for the surrounding rural area. The main shopping street is Wrawby Street, although retail is present throughout much of the old town. Many of the businesses are independent, retaining the character of the traditional high street, although some chain retailers, namely Tesco, Aldi, Lidl and Boyes have large stores in the town. A general market is held on Thursdays and Saturdays, and a farmers' market is also held on the fourth Saturday of each month, selling local produce from pork and organic vegetables to ostrich meat, and locally produced condiments. Artisan breads baked locally and local cheese are sold, including the Lincolnshire Poacher vintage.

Light industry is present on the Island Carr and Atherton Way industrial estates. Glanford Brigg Power Station, a 260 MW gas–fired power station owned by Centrica, sits to the south–west of the town. A second, 40 MW straw–fired, power station has been approved for construction alongside. A significant number of residents commute to work in nearby Scunthorpe and Grimsby, although the town is not characterized as a dormitory town.

Past industries were more strongly connected to the rural economy, such as a beet sugar factory in Scawby Brook, a livestock market, and Spring's jam factory; the latter being a nationally known brand. A corn exchange was built in the town in the 1800s, and the local corn prices were quoted nationally. Scawby Brook was also home to Bratleys roller flour mill, which was demolished in the 1940s although several of the old houses built for the mill owners in the 1830s remain, formerly known as Mill Place, now numbers 79-91 Scawby Road. The town was home to the Falcon Cycles factory for much of its independent existence, the company having moved to Brigg from nearby Barton-upon-Humber in the early 1900s. In 2006, the factory closed and the site was left derelict for 13 years before it was demolished in 2019 to make way for the Falcon Way housing estate, built by Keigar Homes.

Other small independent businesses exist, including several accounts and a stationers. These generally operate out of private residences.

== Culture and community ==
Culture in Brigg is mostly small-scale and self-organized, although there are a few larger events. Currently, there are three yearly general fairs: the Summer Fest in June, the Horse Fair in August, and a Christmas Fair at the end of November. More specialized events include the North Lincolnshire Music and Drama Festival in March, a beer festival in May, and the Briggstock Acoustic Music Festival in early September. Brigg Live Arts also hold a two–yearly cultural festival and art exhibition in the town.

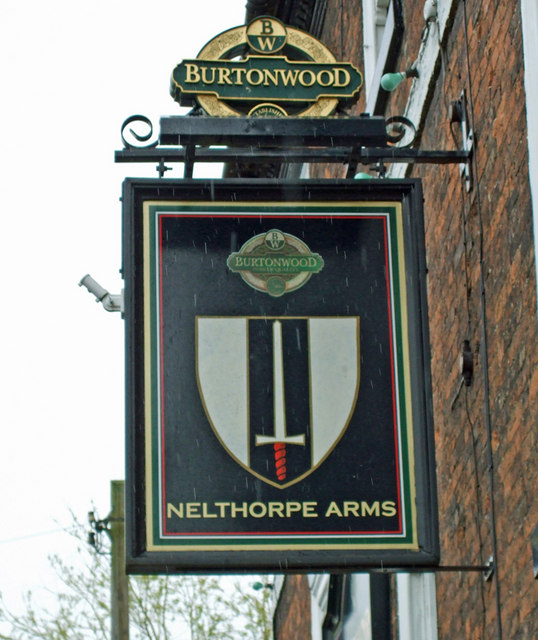
The Sign of the Nelthorpe Arms, Bridge Street

Public facilities in the town include two health centres, a library, heritage centre, three children's playgrounds, and a Sure Start centre. There is also a tourist information centre in the marketplace.

=== Sport and leisure ===
Brigg is home to Brigg Town F.C., known locally as the Zebras for their black and white striped home kit. The team has won the FA Vase twice—once in 1996 and again in 2003. They are members of the Northern Counties East League Division One

The Ancholme Rowing Club, founded in 1868, is based in Manley Gardens. It holds an Annual Head Race every October, attracting crews from across the eastern Midlands and Northern England.

Lincsquad hold two triathlons and a quadrathlon in and around the town every year.

Ancholme Leisure Centre is on Scawby Road (A18) in Scawby Brook, to the west of the town. Its facilities include swimming pools, a sports hall, a gym and a skatepark. The Recreation Ground on Wrawby Road provides an area for field sports.

=== Horse Fair ===
The town hosts a yearly horse fair on the first Saturday of August. Large numbers of Romani and Irish Travellers come from across England to attend the event. The fair is partly an opportunity to buy and sell horses, but also presents a significant opportunity for community socializing. For several decades local volunteers organized the official fair and promoted it as a tourist event, but in recent years it has been left unorganized and unofficial.

The fair has been claimed to be the second largest horse fair in England, after Appleby Horse Fair. It is also the surviving continuation of the medieval fair which was in existence at least as early as 1205, meaning it is now over 800 years old. The difference in date—from 25 July to early August—is a result of the eleven days 'skipped' upon the adoption of the Gregorian calendar in 1752. The fair is also the subject of a well–known folk song Brigg Fair.

=== Folk Song ===
Brigg is the source of several early recordings of English folk song, which subsequently inspired other composers. At competitions arranged by Gervase Elwes in 1905–06, several folk singers from the surrounding area—including Joseph Taylor and George Gouldthorpe—sang for the composer Percy Grainger songs such as Brigg Fair and Lisbon. He also collected Horkstow Grange at nearby Redbourne. These songs inspired Grainger's work Lincolnshire Posy and subsequently Frederick Delius's own Brigg Fair.

=== Media ===
Local news and television programmes are provided by BBC Yorkshire and Lincolnshire and ITV Yorkshire. Television signals are received from the Belmont TV transmitter.

Local radio stations are BBC Radio Humberside on 95.9 FM, Hits Radio East Yorkshire & North Lincolnshire on 96.9 FM, Greatest Hits Radio Lincolnshire on 97.6 FM, and Steel FM, a community based online radio station which broadcast from its studio in Scunthorpe.

The town is served by the local newspaper, Grimsby Telegraph.

== Transport ==
The main transport to and from Brigg is by road. The A18 passes east–west through the town, connecting into the national road network, with the A1084 (Bigby Road) heading south–east to Caistor. The M180 bypasses the town carrying longer distance traffic, including the A15 between Lincoln and Hull. A few bus services operate in the town, most of which travel to Scunthorpe and stop in intermediate villages. On Thursdays a bus service travels solely within the town, carrying passengers to and from the weekly market.

Brigg railway station is on the Grimsby branch of the Sheffield to Lincoln Line. The passenger service is limited, with only one train per day in each direction, on weekdays only. However, the line is still used regularly for freight transport. There is a level crossing over the A1084.

Humberside International Airport, near the village of Kirmington, is about 5 miles (8.0 km) away. There are daily flights to Amsterdam.

The Ancholme river, although once extensively used for transport, is now mostly used for leisure. There is no significant transport of either passengers or freight on the river.

== Education ==
Primary education in Brigg is provided by Brigg County Primary School and St Mary's Catholic Primary Voluntary Academy. There was also previously a private preparatory school, which closed in 2009 and was replaced by Demeter House Special School.

Secondary education in Brigg also covers the surrounding villages and is provided by two comprehensive schools: The Vale Academy, formerly the Vale of Ancholme School, and the Sir John Nelthorpe School, a former grammar school, which has been a comprehensive since 1976. These two schools also collaborate to provide further education for post–16 pupils, although some attend colleges in nearby Scunthorpe. Students of Sir John Nelthorpe School call themselves Briggensians, after the town, and maintain a former students' association.

== Notable residents ==
- Thomas Ball, member of the Parliament of New Zealand from 1866 to 1870, was born in Brigg in 1809. The son of a bookseller, Ball practised as a pharmacist in the town until 1859, when he led a party of 137 local people to settle in New Zealand.
- Gervase Elwes, concert and oratorio singer, had a family home at Brigg Manor in Bigby Street, where he would sometimes reside. North Lincolnshire Music and Drama Festival was founded by Elwes and his wife Winifrede in 1900. They twice hosted their friend Percy Grainger, who collected a number of early folksongs at the festival.
- Mat Dickie, independent video game developer, was born and raised in Brigg.
- Richard Enraght, who later became known as a religious controversialist, served as curate for St John's Church in Brigg from 1866 to 1867.
- Malcolm Flemyng, a Scottish physiologist, practised medicine in the town in the 1750s. While resident, Flemyng published his Introduction to Physiology and conducted research into amniotic fluid and obesity.
- Joseph Kitchen, English Footballer, played as a striker for the FA cup winning Sheffield United team in 1939 resided at The Gables, 91 Scawby Road and later owned the Wheatsheaf pub in Barton upon Humber.
- John Osborne, writer and creator of Sky 1 show After Hours, as well as several storytelling shows for BBC Radio 4, grew up in Brigg, attending Sir John Nelthorpe school from 1993 to 1998 and Brigg Sixth Form (1998-2000).
- Joan Plowright, actress and wife of Laurence Olivier, was born on Central Square in 1929. Her brother David Plowright, a television executive, was born a year later. Their father William was a local journalist and newspaper editor. The Plowright Theatre in nearby Scunthorpe is named after her.
- Matthew Sparrow, footballer for Scunthorpe United and Brighton and Hove Albion, grew up in Brigg, where he played football for Sir John Nelthorpe school from 1993 to 1998. He carried on living in Brigg while playing for Scunthorpe United.
- David Yelland, journalist and editor of The Sun from 1998 to 2003, was a student at Sir John Nelthorpe School from 1976 to 1981.
