= Malcolm Flemyng =

Scottish physiologist

Malcolm Flemyng, M.D. (d. 1764), was a Scottish physiologist.

== Background ==
Flemyng was born in Scotland early in the eighteenth century. He was a pupil of Monro at Edinburgh and of Boerhaave at Leyden. In the first of his five printed letters to Haller (Epist. ad Hallerum, vol. iii.) he speaks of Boerhaave as their common preceptor, and as having been 'mihi supra fidem amicus et beneficus,’ but to Haller himself he would be 'prorsus ignotus,’ although they may have been at Leyden at the same time. He began practice in Scotland about 1725, and removed after a time to Hull. In 1751, finding his health unequal to a country practice, he came to London, and made an attempt to support a wife and three children by teaching physiology. His lessons were intended for medical pupils who had not been at the universities, and were unable to read the standard books in learned or foreign languages. He seems to have read only one course of lectures, in the winter of 1751–2; in 1752 he issued a syllabus of the lectures, but probably he got no more pupils, the attempt being premature for London. About the end of 1752 he left London and settled at Brigg in Lincolnshire, on account of his wife's health, and to obtain practice. In a letter to Haller (February 1753), shortly after his arrival at Brigg, he hints at a possibility of teaching physiology at Oxford and Cambridge. The last letter to Haller (Brigg, June 1753) contains a Latin ode on the peace of Aix, 'to fill up the page.' In 1763 he was living at Lincoln, and still in practice. He died there 7 March 1764 (Gent. Mag. 146).

== Writings ==
Flemyng's writings show him to have been well abreast of the best physiological teaching of his time, and an original experimenter and reasoner as well. One of the Haller letters (iii. 369) contains a statement of the fact that motor and sensory nerves are anatomically distinct, although they might coexist in the same bundle; the experimental proof came many years after. The ossicles of the ear serve the same purpose, he says, as the wooden rod inside a violin, 'ad continuandos tremores.' His 'Introduction to Physiology,’ 369 pages, 8vo, Lond. 1759, being the substance of his London lectures increased to twenty-eight, is full of the latest information well digested. He employed a person in the Norway trade to get for him a manuscript copy of a paper on the resuscitation of the drowned by a Copenhagen authority. His first work, dated from Hull in June 1738 and published at York in 1740, was 'Neuropathia,’ a Latin poem in three books on hypochondriasis and hysteria, with a prose summary and additions prefixed, dedicated to Peter Shaw ('Doctissime Shavi!’); it was republished at Rome, with an Italian translation by Moretti, in 1755. His next venture was 'A Proposal for the Improvement of Medicine, &c.,’ being a collection of therapeutic essays on the use of bark in smallpox, on limes and other fruits and vegetables in scurvy, &c.; it was dedicated to Mead, who had been pleased with the 'Neuropathia.' In 1748 he published a new edition, much enlarged, and with remarks on Berkeley's tar water doctrine and on the bishop's use of the term ‘panacea.’ In 1751 he published in London 'The Nature of the Nervous Fluid, or Animal Spirits,’ an attempt to adapt the latter doctrine to current nervous physiology. In the same year he published anonymously 'A new Critical Examination of an Important Passage in Mr. Locke's Essay on Human Understanding [on the possibility of thought being superadded to matter], in a familiar letter to a friend.' In 1753 he issued a physiological comment on Solano's prognostics from the pulse (dicrotism, intermittence, &c.), an account of which had been brought to England by Dr. Nihell, physician to the English factory at Madrid. In 1755 Flemyng published a paper in the 'Philosophical Transactions' on the imbibition of the liquor amnii by the fœtus. Another paper, on corpulence, was read at the Royal Society in 1757, but not issued until the author printed it in 1760; it was translated into German by Joseph Jakob Plenk at Vienna in 1769, and reprinted in London as late as 1810. In 1754 he published at York 'A Proposal to diminish the Progress of the Distemper among the Horned Cattle' (2nd edition, Lond. 1755). His other writings are a 'Dissertation on James's Fever Powder' (Lond. 1760), and 'Adhesions or Accretions of the Lungs to the Pleura' (Lond. 1762), discussing the divergent views of Boerhaave and Haller as to the effects on the breathing. A disparaging criticism of this unimportant piece by a London reviewer caused him to issue the remainder of the impression with a 'Vindication' in 1763.
