= Joseph Taylor (folk singer) =

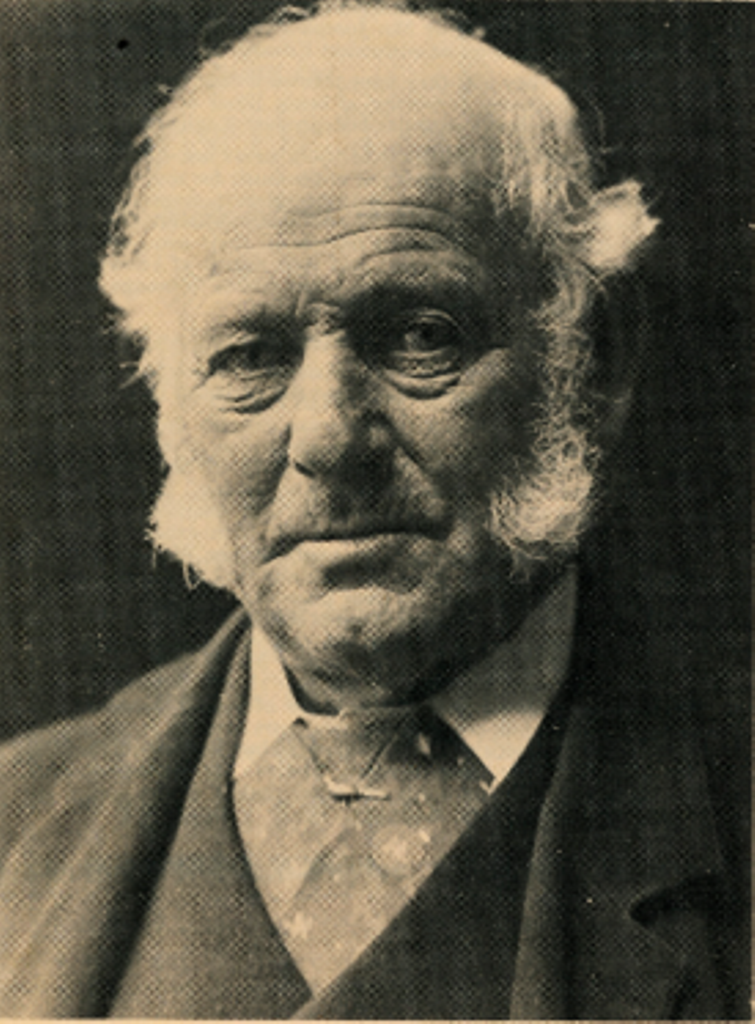
- Facsimile of the insert from the 1908 His Master's Voice release 'Percy Grainger's Collection of English Folk-Songs sung by Genuine Peasant Performers'

Background information
- Born: 10 September 1833; Binbrook, Lincolnshire
- Origin: Saxby-All-Saints, Lincolnshire, England
- Died: 4 May 1910 (aged 76) Saxby-All-Saints, Lincolnshire
- Genres: English folk music
- Occupations: Farm bailiff, carpenter, singer
- Label: His Master's Voice

Joseph Taylor (10 September 1833 – 4 May 1910), was a folk singer from Saxby-All-Saints, Lincolnshire, England, who became the first English folk singer to be commercially recorded after coming to the attention of the composer and musicologist Percy Grainger.

He popularised obscure and unique songs including "Brigg Fair", "Rufford Park Poachers" and "The White Hare", and sang influential versions of well-known songs and ballads such as "Lord Bateman" and "The Sprig of Thyme". His songs were arranged by classical composers including Grainger and Frederick Delius, and recorded by folk revival musicians beginning in the British folk revival of the 1960s.

His singing was recorded by Grainger onto wax cylinders, which have been digitised and made available online by the British Library Sound Archive as part of the Percy Grainger Collection.

== Life and family ==
=== Early life ===
Taylor was born in the village of Binbrook, Lincolnshire, to James Taylor (1806-1857) from Fotherby, Lincolnshire and Mary Ann Smith (1811-1898) from Barnoldby le Beck, Lincolnshire. He studied arboriculture, and eventually was in charge of a large estate comprising two villages, several farms and some woods.

Sometime around 1850, Taylor visited a gypsy camp two nights in a row to hear their songs. The gypsies taught him many songs, including "Brigg Fair".

When Taylor was in his 20s, he was imprisoned for six months at Binbrook for feeding a farmer's wheat to the farmer's own horses.

=== Marriage and family ===
Taylor married Eliza Hill (1827-1909), who came from the village of Huttoft, and had seven children: James (1858-1915); Betsy (1860-1929); John (1864-1947); Joseph (1864-1880), who drowned in the River Ancholme at the age of 15; Anne (1867-1937); Frederick (1869-?); and Mary (1871-1967). Mary was interviewed about her father's singing by Peter Kennedy in 1953. The recording is kept by the British Library and is available online.

Later in life, Taylor worked as a farm bailiff, singing for pleasure as well as in his local church choir, and in competitions.

=== Appearance and personality ===
Percy Grainger described Taylor as follows:

Though his age is seventy-five his looks are those of middle age, while his flowing, ringing tenor voice is well nigh as fresh as that of his son, who has repeatedly won the first prize for tenor solo at the North Lincolnshire musical competitions. He has sung in the choir of Saxby-all-Saints Church for forty-five years. He is a courteous, genial, typical English countryman, and a perfect artist in the purest possible style of folk-song singing...

He most intelligently realizes just what sort of songs collectors are after, distinguishes surprisingly between genuine traditional tunes and other ditties, and is, in every way, a marvel of helpfulness and kindliness. Nothing could be more refreshing than his hale countrified looks and the happy lilt of his cheery voice.

== Percy Grainger ==
Percy Grainger first came into contact with Joseph Taylor when he saw him perform in the North Lincolnshire Musical Competition in 1905, which he had entered reluctantly and won with his version of ‘Creeping Jane’. Grainger first noted down ‘Brigg Fair’ from Taylor when he and Frank Kidson were collecting songs from the competitors after the competition. Grainger visited Taylor the following year when he won the competition again, singing ‘Brigg Fair’ and ‘William Taylor’. In July 1906, Grainger invited Taylor to Brigg so he could record him with the phonograph. Grainger returned again in 1908 and Taylor was again recorded.

In 1908, Grainger was instrumental in the Gramophone Company inviting Taylor to London, where a dozen of his songs were recorded, with nine subsequently being released on a series of seven gramophone discs, on the His Master's Voice label, as part of a series billed as "Percy Grainger's Collection of English Folk-Songs sung by Genuine Peasant Performers". In the accompanying booklet, Grainger wrote:

Mr. Joseph Taylor is in most respects the most exceptional folksinger I have yet heard. Although he is 75 years of age, his lovely tenor voice is as fresh as a young man's, while the ease and ring of the high notes, the freshness of his rhythmic attack, his clear intonation of modal intervals, and his finished execution of ornamental turns and twiddles (in which so many folk-singers abound) are typical of all that is best in the vocal art of the peasant traditional-singers of these islands.

Though his memory for the texts of songs was not uncommonly good, his mind was a seemingly unlimited store-house of melodies, which he swiftly recalled at the merest mention of their titles. His versions were generally distinguished by the beauty of their melodic curves and by the symmetry of their construction. He relied more upon purely vocal effects than almost any folk-singer I ever heard. His dialect and his treatment of narrative points were not so exceptional, but his effortless high notes, sturdy rhythms, clean unmistakable intervals and his twiddles and ‘bleating’ ornaments (invariably executed with unfailing grace and neatness) were irresistible.

The British Library Sound Archive describes these releases as "a first in our field, and decades before any other attempt to issue real traditional singing on record for public consumption".

== Classical arrangements of his songs ==
Grainger's recordings and transcriptions of Taylors's singing came to the attention of the composer Frederick Delius, who requested and secured permission to use Grainger's harmonies in his own arrangement of one of Taylor's songs, Brigg Fair. Taylor was Guest of Honour at the first performance, at the Queen's Hall in London, and reputedly stood to sing along, although his daughter Mary stated that he simply hummed along rather than sang out loud. He sat with Percy Granger, Grainger’s mother and Delius himself.

Grainger's own folksong-inspired Lincolnshire Posy (1940) was dedicated by the composer, to "the singers who sang so sweetly to me".

== Later releases and archives ==
Ten of Taylor's Gramophone Company recordings were released, as Brigg Fair: Joseph Taylor and Other Traditional Lincolnshire Singers (Leader LEA4050) by Leader Records in 1972, alongside recordings, of Taylor and others, transferred from Grainger's wax cylinders.

Grainger's wax cylinders were copied onto lacquer discs by the Library of Congress in around 1940. The British Library digitised their set of these discs in 2018 and has made them available online.

== Death and legacy ==
Joseph Taylor died following an accident on the 4th of May, 1910. The following report was printed in The Lindsey and Lincolnshire Star three days later:

...whilst driving out on Tuesday was thrown out of the trap on to the horse, through the animal shying at something on the road. The man, though bruised on the shoulder, continued his further five-mile drive, and drove back another ten miles. After fetching some cows from a field, he complained of severe pains in the pit of the stomach, and went to bed. Dr Morley, of Barton, was sent for, but before his arrival death had taken place.

As well as being known for providing songs arranged by classical composers, many of the songs performed by Taylor and recorded by Grainger became part of the canon of the British folk revival. Martin Carthy, for example, recorded several, including "The White Hare" and "Creeping Jane".

Percy Grainger's first meeting with Joseph Taylor has been called "a major turning point in the history of traditional folk music".

== List of songs ==
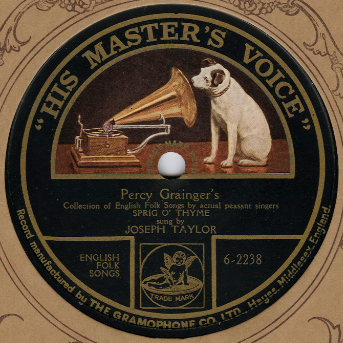
Label of one of the His Master's Voice gramophone records

Songs performed by Taylor, and recorded by Grainger, included:

- Barbara Ellen
- Bold Nevison
- Bold William Taylor
- Brigg Fair
- Creeping Jane
- Died For Love
- Geordie
- Green Bushes
- Landlord And Tenant
- Lord Bateman
- Murder Maria Martin
- Once I Courted A Damsel
- Rufford Park Poachers
- The Bachelor Bright And Brave
- The Gipsy's Wedding Day
- The Gown Of Green
- The Ship's Carpenter
- The Spotted Cow
- The Sprig Of Thyme
- The White Hare
- The Yarborough Hunt
- Three Times Round Went Our Gallant Ship
- When I Was Young In My Youthful Ways
- Where Are You Goin' To My Pretty Maid
- Worcester City
- Young William The Ploughboy

All of the recordings are currently available on the British Library Sound Archive website.

== See also ==
List of traditional singers
