= South Ferriby =

Village in North Lincolnshire, England

Coordinates: 53.67727°N 0.50656°W

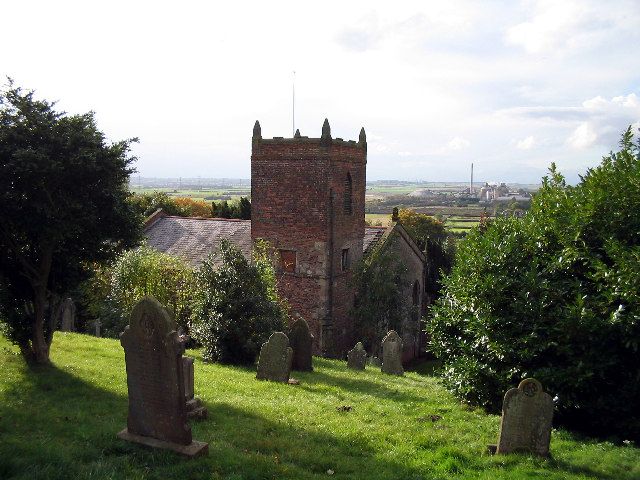
- St Nicholas' Church, South Ferriby

- Location within Lincolnshire
- Population: 651 (2011 census)
- OS grid reference: SE987210
  - London: 155 mi (249 km) S
- Unitary authority: North Lincolnshire
- Ceremonial county: Lincolnshire
- Region: Yorkshire and the Humber
- Country: England
- Sovereign state: United Kingdom
- Post town: BARTON-UPON-HUMBER
- Postcode district: DN18
- Dialling code: 01652
- Police: Humberside
- Fire: Humberside
- Ambulance: East Midlands
- UK Parliament: Brigg and Immingham

South Ferriby is a village in North Lincolnshire, England. It is situated on the south bank of the Humber Estuary and 3 miles (5 km) west from the Humber Bridge. North Ferriby is directly opposite on the Estuary's north bank. Village population was 651 in 2011.

== History ==
South Ferriby dates back at least to Roman times when there was a major settlement. It is known locally as one of the 'Low Villages' at the bottom of a chalk escarpment, where the chalk meets the clay to give, before piped water, (the village was one of the first to have piped water with houses plumbing into the supply which was put down to supply steam ships) to the a plentiful water supply. It also marks the point where the Lincolnshire Wolds meet the Humber Estuary and was, as the name suggests, the southern end of an ancient ferry over the Humber to North Ferriby. The entry in the Domesday Book of 1086 records a church, a mill and two ferries. To sustain two ferries suggests that a prosperous trading community must have been flourishing at the time.

South Ferriby was once two villages, Ferriby Sluice with its strong connection to brick manufacture and other activities on the River Ancholme and South Ferriby with two farms that are still operational. The village has a general store with post office, garage, primary school and two public houses: the Nelthorpe Arms, which has recently been brought back to life in a £370,000 refit in 2018, named after the family who at the beginning of the 19th century owned over half the village (and still have major holdings today), and, down by the Sluice, the Hope and Anchor which looks out over the Humber with Read's Island and its wildlife.

The Church of St Nicholas dates to the 13th century; it is a structure consisting of nave, south transept, north porch and an embattled tower with pinnacles at the south-east corner containing 3 bells. Over the porch is tympanum, on which is a sculptured figure of St Nicholas, vested in alb and mitre and holding a pastoral staff in his left hand and on either side are symbolical figures of the Sun and Moon. The unusual north–south alignment of the current church is a legacy of a Victorian enlargements of the church. The Creed and Commandment boards survived in the vestry in the 1990s, and the present pulpit is a surviving element of the 18th century two- or three-decker pulpit dismantled during the 1870s reordering of the church. This was the chancel prior to the 1870s, the nave of the church having been rebuilt almost square following a landslip caused by water springs in the late 16th century.

Ferriby Hall is now a private residence once again, having formerly been used as nursing home. Originally a private house until at least the 1960s. In 1953 some contents of the house were lent to Hull Museum on permanent loan. The house was owned in the 1960s by the Booty Family but had to be sold after Leonard Booty, grandson of Frederick Booty absconded with the family inheritance.

The village was badly flooded in the storm surge of December 2013.

== Geography ==
South Ferriby lies on the route of the Viking Way, the 147 miles (237 km) long-distance footpath from the Humber Bridge to Oakham, and is on the side of an escarpment overlooking the Ancholme valley. The A1077 climbs the steep escarpment at this point, and meets the B1204 from the south, which follows the escarpment to Elsham Hall Country Park (former A15 road) via Horkstow. The A1077 is sometimes closed to let boats through the sluice.

== Transport ==
South Ferriby's closest railway station is Barton-upon-Humber. Trains from here go to Cleethorpes and Grimsby with services being every two hours during the week. South Ferriby is close to the A15 that crosses the Humber estuary to connect to the A63 to Hull and the M62 motorway.

== Economy ==
The only industry is the cement works. The plant, owned by Cemex (formerly Rugby Cement, and before that Eastwood's Humber Cement), is a prominent landmark in the village, and obtains its raw material from the Middlegate Lane quarry on the hill above. There is an overhead conveyor belt that passes to the south of the village from the Middlegate Lane quarry to the cement processing works to the south-west over the River Ancholme.

In May 2020, Cemex announced its intention to mothball the plant in the autumn of 2020. The company stated that the intended mothballing was not as a result of the COVID-19 pandemic, but due to changes in the European market.
