= Bonby =

Village and civil parish in North Lincolnshire, England

Coordinates: 53.625389°N 0.485407°W

- Location within Lincolnshire
- Population: 532 (2011)
- OS grid reference: TA002153
  - London: 145 mi (233 km) S
- Unitary authority: North Lincolnshire
- Ceremonial county: Lincolnshire
- Region: Yorkshire and the Humber
- Country: England
- Sovereign state: United Kingdom
- Post town: Brigg
- Postcode district: DN20
- Dialling code: 01652
- Police: Humberside
- Fire: Humberside
- Ambulance: East Midlands
- UK Parliament: Brigg and Immingham

Bonby is a village and civil parish in North Lincolnshire, England, and approximately 4 miles (6 km) south from Barton-upon-Humber. According to the 2001 census it had a population of 481, increasing to 532 at the 2011 census.

The village was recorded in the Domesday Book under the name of "Bundebi".

The Grade II listed Anglican parish church is dedicated to St Andrew. The church has an Early English nave and chancel, and a 17th-century brick tower. Bonby held a small priory, established by the Benedictine priory of St Fromund in Normandy. The priory was transferred to the Carthusian order at Beauvale, Nottinghamshire.

== Gallery ==
widths="180px"

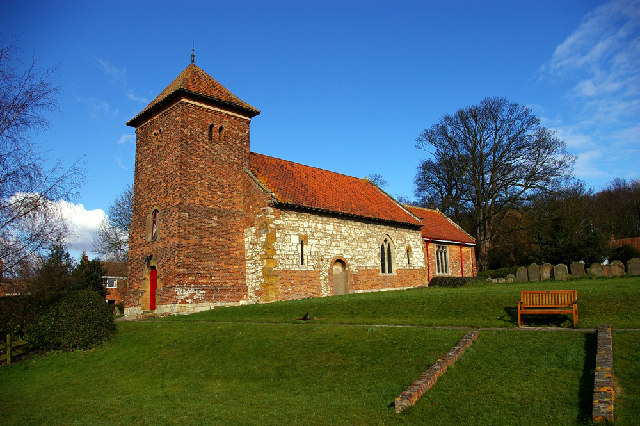
Church of St Andrew, Bonby

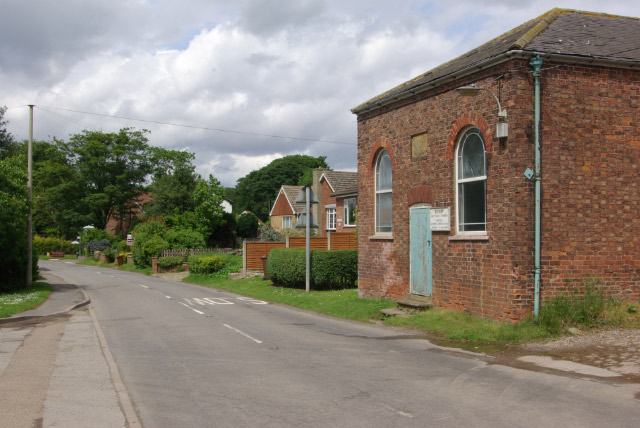
Former Methodist chapel, Bonby

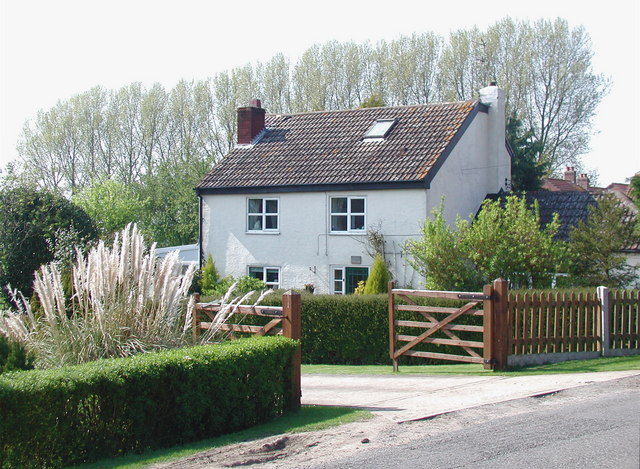
Main Street, Bonby
