= Lincolnshire Posy =

1937 musical composition by Percy Grainger

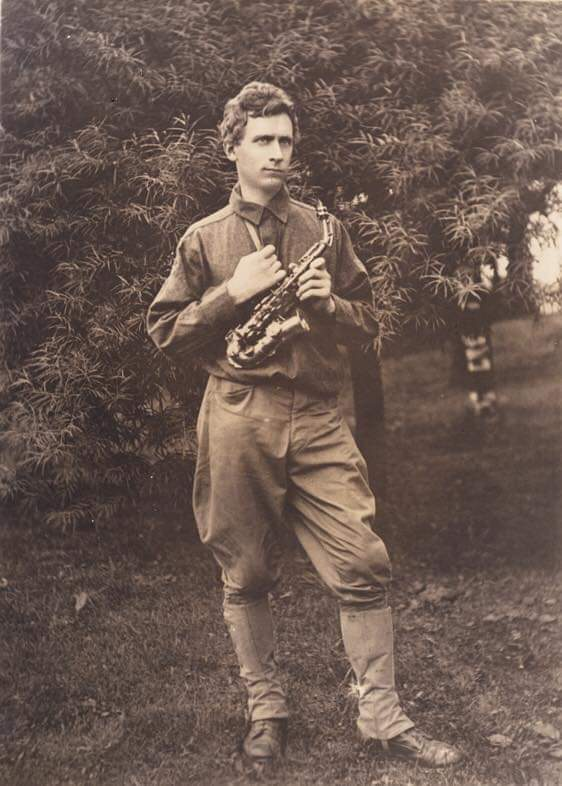
Percy Grainger in the 1920s

Lincolnshire Posy is a musical composition by Percy Grainger for concert band commissioned in 1937 by the American Bandmasters Association. Considered by John Bird, the author of Grainger's biography, to be his masterpiece, the 16-minute-long work has six movements, each adapted from folk songs that Grainger had collected on a 1905–1906 trip to Lincolnshire, England. In a similar fashion to these folk songs, many of the movements are in strophic form. The work debuted with three movements on March 7, 1937 performed by the Milwaukee Symphonic Band, a group composed of members from bands including the Blatz Brewery and Pabst Blue Ribbon beer factory worker bands in Milwaukee, Wisconsin.

Unlike other composers who attempted to alter and modernize folk music, such as Ralph Vaughan Williams, Grainger wished to maintain the exact stylizing that he experienced from the originals. In the piece's program notes, Grainger wrote: "...Each number is intended to be a kind of musical portrait of the singer who sang its underlying melody—a musical portrait of the singer's personality no less than of his habits of song—his regular or irregular interpretation of the rhythm, his preference for gaunt or ornately arabesqued delivery, his contrasts of legato and staccato, his tendency towards breadth or delicacy of tone."

Grainger dedicated his "bunch of Wildflowers" to "the old folksingers who sang so sweetly to me".

== Instrumentation ==
The suite is scored for the following band:

Woodwinds
Piccolo
2 Flutes
2 Oboes
Cor anglais
2 Bassoons
Contrabassoon
Clarinet in E♭
3 Clarinets in B♭
Alto clarinet in E♭
Bass clarinet in B♭
Soprano saxophone
2 Alto saxophones
Tenor saxophone
Baritone saxophone
Bass saxophone
Brass
3 Trumpets (divided a2)
4 Horns in F
2 Tenor trombones
Bass trombone
Baritone
Euphonium
Tuba (divided a2)
Strings
String bass
Percussion
Timpani
Xylophone
Glockenspiel
Handbells
Tubular bells
Snare drum
Bass drum
Cymbals

== Movements ==
The work has six movements:

1. "Lisbon"
2. "Horkstow Grange"
3. "Rufford Park Poachers"
4. "The Brisk Young Sailor"
5. "Lord Melbourne"
6. "The Lost Lady Found"

=== I. "Lisbon" ===
Originally entitled "Dublin Bay", the first movement is the shortest—a simple, lilting melody in 6/8 time. The melody follows a young sailor preparing to leave his love to head towards Lisbon. In the opening of the movement, the main theme is stated by the 1st and 2nd trumpets (with mutes), 1st horns, and bassoon. As is typical with any piece of music in strophic form such as this, the theme is repeated throughout by the other sections of the ensemble. Later in the movement, the 1st horns and trumpets quote another Grainger work, entitled "The Duke of Marlborough Fanfare" as the rest of the ensemble continues with a repetition of the theme. The final repetition augments the theme and ends with a 2-3 retardation.

=== II. "Horkstow Grange" ===
Also in strophic form, the theme is stated by the clarinets and horns at the opening of the movement. Shifting between 4/4 and 5/4 time, the movement features a cornet solo, which may be substituted with soprano saxophone. Although associated with the village called Horkstow, its name in the title was originally misprinted "Harkstow Grange".

=== III. "Rufford Park Poachers" ===
Based on the ballad of the same name which Grainger had learned from folk singer Joseph Taylor, this movement is considered quite difficult to count due to the counterpoint, unusual rhythms, and rapidly shifting time signatures. Grainger wrote two versions of this movement. Version A begins in F minor with an asymmetric melody between piccolo and B♭ clarinet echoed by E♭ clarinet and bass clarinet, and features a flugelhorn solo. Meanwhile, Version B begins in C minor with the beginning melody between piccolo and alto clarinet echoed by oboe and bassoon, and instead features a soprano saxophone solo. Both versions are the same from measure 51 to the end.

It is noted that Grainger preferred Version B, but only if the saxophone soloist was able to perform the solo with much expression and musicality. Therefore, most ensembles who record the work in its entirety choose this version in order to stay true to the composer's wishes.

The ensemble Grainger had chosen to premiere the piece, the Milwaukee Symphonic Band, was unable to play this movement, which led to its being omitted from the premiere performance, along with the fifth movement.

=== IV. "The Brisk Young Sailor" ===
A simple, short, jaunty tune in the key of B♭ major meant to evoke the image of a strapping young lad striding up the road to meet his sweetheart. The movement, also in strophic form, opens with the clarinet section stating the theme. The theme is then elaborated upon by the entire ensemble with several variations.

A notable part of this movement is a baritone horn solo, which is accompanied by the first clarinets, E♭ clarinet, flutes, and piccolo with virtuosic sextuplet patterns and arpeggios. This accompaniment is a technical challenge regarded by many as the reason for this movement is among the most difficult of the six movements to perform.

=== V. "Lord Melbourne" ===
A fierce war song originally entitled "Lord Marlborough", the title refers to John Churchill, 1st Duke of Marlborough. It opens in free time, then moves into a trumpet solo followed by a repetition of the opening, also in free time. This movement shifts into different time signatures in short succession, including asymmetrical ones such as 5/8 and 3/8, as well as having more intermittent sections of free time.

Like the third movement, this movement was omitted at the work's premiere.

=== VI. "The Lost Lady Found" ===
A lilting, 3/4 melody in strophic form. Almost every section of the ensemble states the theme at some point in the movement.

This movement is based on the ballad of the same name, in which a lady, who while living with her uncle in a village is kidnapped by three Roma. After being missing for a long time, the villagers begin to speculate that the uncle is responsible for her disappearance, later imprisoning him and condemning him to death. At some point, the lady was found in Dublin by a young squire who loved her and was subsequently brought back to the village. Upon return to the village, the villagers, mere moments away from executing the uncle at the gallows, realized their error and set the uncle free, celebrating the lady's return with church bells (which are emulated by the tubular bells in the closing of the movement), music, and frivolity.

As this movement was not yet completed at the time of the work's premiere, it was omitted for the performance.

== Early performances ==
The March 1937, a Milwaukee "premiere" included only half the piece's six movements; New York's Goldman Band, led by Grainger, performed the work in its entirety on 21 June 1937 in Central Park. The NBC radio network broadcast the concert in the U.S. and Canada.

The New York City Symphonic Band—a unit of the city's WPA Music Project—performed the composition at the Brooklyn Museum on 30 March 1941 and 25 January 1942, as well as in Forest Park, Queens, on 7 September 1941. The three performances were led by Columbia University's Harwood Simmons. The Goldman Band programmed the piece again for its summer 1941 outdoor concerts at New York's Prospect Park and Central Park. Chicago first heard Lincolnshire Posy on 29 July 1941, played by Glenn Cliffe Bainum's band in Grant Park.
