= Fred Spira =

- Born: Siegfried Franz Spira; August 7, 1924; Vienna, Austria
- Died: September 2, 2007 (aged 83); New York, New York, US
- Other name: S. Franklin Spira
- Occupations: Businessman, photography historian, author
- Years active: 1946–1987
- Known for: Founder and owner of Spiratone
- Relatives: Jonathan Spira (son)
- Website: Archived official website

Fred Spira (1924–2007) was an inventor and innovator in photography as well as a collector of photographic equipment, images, books, and ephemera. He is credited as one of three individuals who opened up the U.S. market to quality Japanese photographic goods.

== Biography ==
=== Early years ===
Siegfried Franz Spira was born in Vienna, Austria to Hans and Paula (née Back) Spira. His father was an official at the Bodencreditanstalt bank and later owned the Photohaus Spira-Ritz. Spira attended the Amerlinggymnasium until after the Anschluß, when he was forced to leave school because of his Jewish heritage. In March 1939, he left Vienna through a Kindertransport rescue mission and, as a result, spent ten months in Doncaster, England, where he attended the Percy Jackson Grammar School. He left England with his father in June 1940, sailing to North America on the SS Antonia, where the two were reunited with Spira's mother, who had arrived in New York on the SS Volendam in February of that year.

=== Youth ===
In order to make ends meet, the family started Spiratone Fine Grain Laboratories, a photo-processing business, in their apartment. Spira worked for the family business as well as part-time for another photofinisher, while attending evening high school and graduating as the class valedictorian. His father died unexpectedly in 1945 and Spira, who was already attending college, left school to support his mother and himself.

=== Spiratone ===
In 1946, Spira opened a store on West 27th Street and started to sell a variety of photographic equipment, including cameras and accessories, by mail. In the late 1940s, he became one of the first importers to work with Japanese manufacturers in developing lenses, flash units, exposure meters, tripods, and other photographic accessories. Since his company name, Spiratone, had become fairly well known and the Japanese brands were completely unknown, the products that came out of these partnerships were sold under the Spiratone brand and Spira established rigorous quality assurance procedures to ensure that the merchandise that bore his name worked as intended.

Spira merged Spiratone with a public company, Interphoto, and the relationship with Interphoto allowed the company to expand its reach, in 1967.

According to Herbert Keppler, tests of Spiratone lenses "often proved them equal to or superior to that of famous manufacturers' own products." Well-known photographer and writer Norman Rothschild used Spiratone lenses and filters for many of his photographs that appeared in the pages of Popular Photography magazine where he served as a writer and editor for a third of a century.

Spira was also at the "forefront" of the technological revolution in lens attachments having developed a variety of filters and lens accessories that added unusual and special effects to photographs, and was "the most important" supplier of such attachments.

Spira left the company in 1987, and Spiratone ceased operation in the early 1990s.

=== The Spira Collection ===
Spira began collecting autographs relating to the history of photography in the 1960s. By the end of that decade, he had progressed to collecting historic cameras and was involved in organizing what became the American Photographic Historical Society.

The Spira Collection eventually included over 20,000 items, including many items not found in any other collection. The George Eastman House held an exhibit of unique pieces from The Spira Collection in 1981, the first time items from a private collection were ever placed on exhibit there. The major part of the Spira Collection was sold to the state of Qatar with plans of having the collection placed displayed in a yet to be constructed purpose-built photography museum. The remaining part was sold at auction in Vienna from 2006. In 2014, Qatar Museums Authority announced that severe budget cuts would results in layoffs and scrapping plans to build the proposed International Media Museum that would have housed their part of the Spira Collection. Since that announcement, the fate of the Spira Collection is not known since the museum authority have since removed all mentions of the collection from their website.

=== History of Photography book ===
In the late 1990s, Spira, with the encouragement of Aperture Foundation executive director Michael Hoffman, began writing a book on the history of photography, using pieces from The Spira Collection as illustrations. As the book got underway, Spira started to show signs of Alzheimer's and his son, Jonathan Spira, helped finish the book. Released in 2001, The History of Photography As Seen Through The Spira Collection was named "a best book of the year" by The New York Times. Todd Gustavson, Technology Curator at George Eastman House, called it "one of the most important photo-history books of the last quarter century."

=== Death ===
Spira died from complications of Alzheimer's disease on September 2, 2007, at his home in Beechhurst, Queens, New York, at the age of 83.
