= Adwick le Street =

Village in South Yorkshire, England

Coordinates: 53.56765°N 1.19313°W

- Village
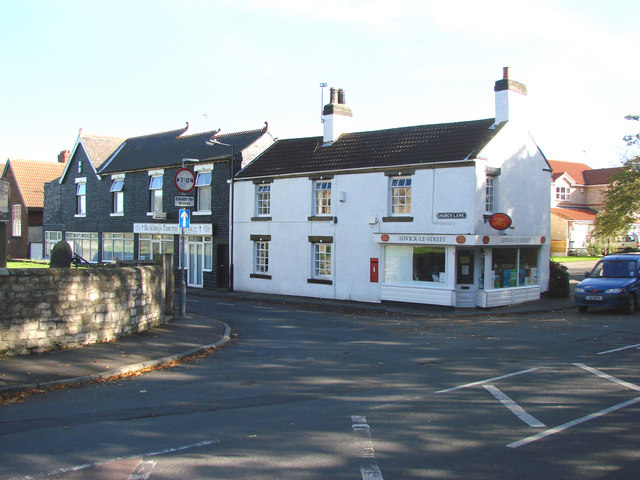
- Post office

- Location within South Yorkshire
- Area: 4.56 sq mi (11.8 km^{2})
- Population: 15,911 (Ward, 2011 census)
  - Density: 3,489/sq mi (1,347/km^{2})
- OS grid reference: SE535083
- Metropolitan borough: City of Doncaster
- Metropolitan county: South Yorkshire
- Region: Yorkshire and the Humber
- Country: England
- Sovereign state: United Kingdom
- Post town: DONCASTER
- Postcode district: DN6
- Dialling code: 01302
- Police: South Yorkshire
- Fire: South Yorkshire
- Ambulance: Yorkshire
- UK Parliament: Doncaster North

Adwick le Street is a village in the City of Doncaster, South Yorkshire, England. It is situated north-west of Doncaster. It had a population of 2,815 as of 2014.

Adwick lends its name to the wider Adwick le Street & Carcroft ward of Doncaster Metropolitan Borough Council, which also includes Carcroft, Woodlands and Highfields. These had a combined population of 16,518 at the time of the 2021 Census. As of 2023, the largest of these settlements independently is Woodlands, with a confirmed population of 7,100.

Adwick's district, in the 1920s, had a population of around 12,000. The West Riding of Yorkshire's Adwick le Street Urban District existed until 1974. Within the former urban district lies the model village of Woodlands, built for Brodsworth Colliery.

== History ==
=== Roman ===
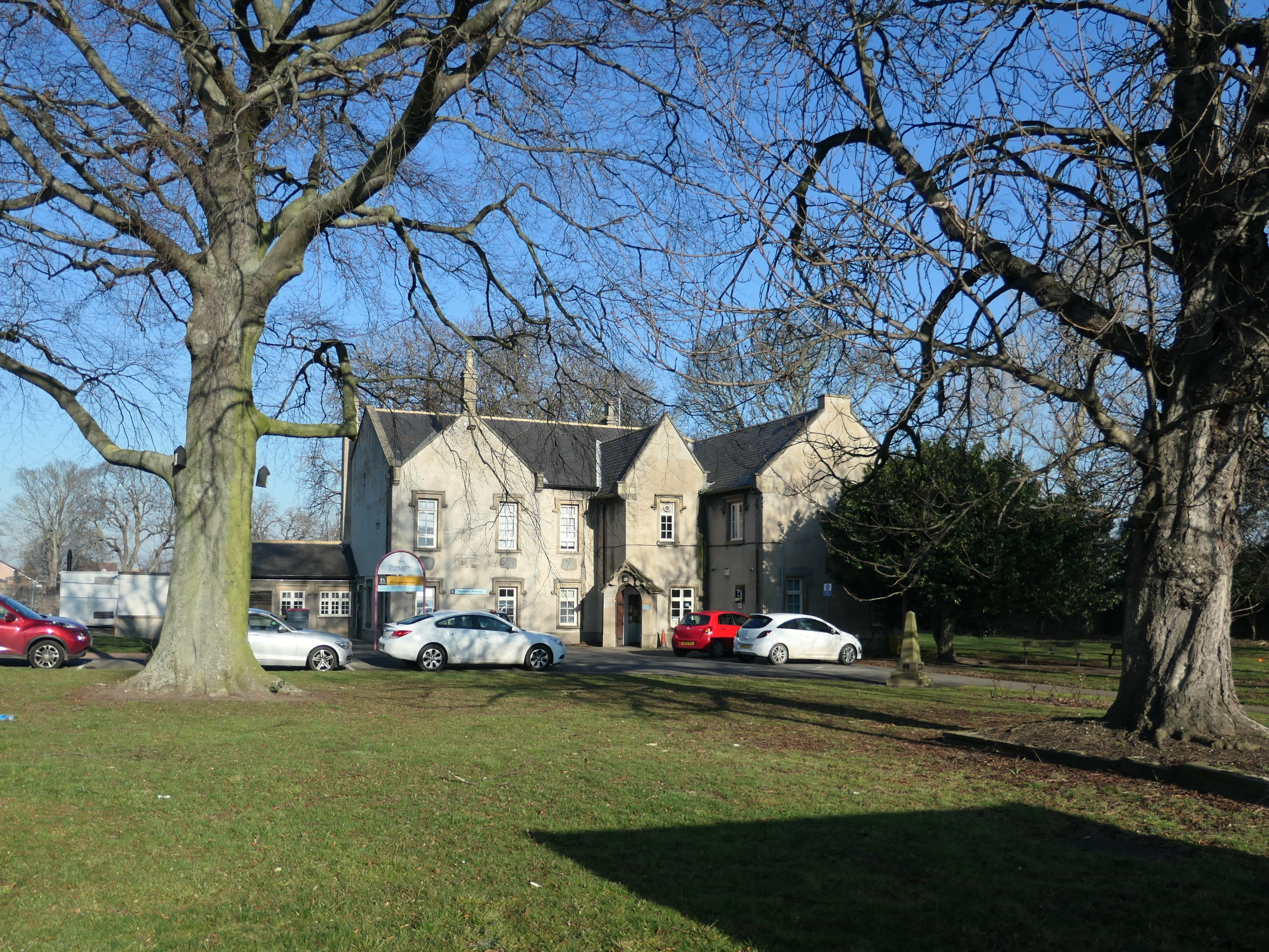
Adwick Town Hall

The town derives its name from the great north British Roman routeway, Ermine Street. This road, also known as the Roman Ridge, follows the A638 (former A1) northwards through the centre of Doncaster (former Danum) until the junction of the A635 and A638. It follows to the west of the A638, and passes along the western perimeter of Woodlands, dividing the estate from the Red House industrial park. It rejoins the Great North Road (the A1 at this point) at the Red House interchange.

=== Medieval ===
The name Adwick derives from the Old English addawīc meaning 'Adda's trading settlement'.

In December 2007, archaeologists from ARCUS were called in after site workers preparing for the construction of the brand new North Ridge Community School unearthed human remains. The new School, for special needs children, was to be built adjacent to North Doncaster Technology College (now Outwood Academy Adwick).

40 graves were discovered; 37 containing skeletal remains dating between 660 AD and 880 AD, the Middle Saxon period. There was some erosion and disturbance on the site. A small number of grave goods were found but in the future, any artefacts will be archived in Doncaster Museum.

This is believed to be the first Anglo-Saxon or early Medieval cemetery of this type found in South Yorkshire and one of the most significant Anglo-Saxon finds in the country. The earliest references to the settlement are found in the Domesday Book of 1086.

Adwick Town Hall was built as a rectory in 1682.

== Religion ==
St Laurence Church

There are two churches - the main one is dedicated to St Laurence in the old village to the north, and the other is in Woodlands and is All Saints. The parish church of St. Laurence dates from the 12th century. The religious parish of St Laurence also includes the southern part of Hampole civil parish (from Hampole Wood to Harry Wood further north), but not the northern Skelbrooke part.

== Transport ==
=== Road ===
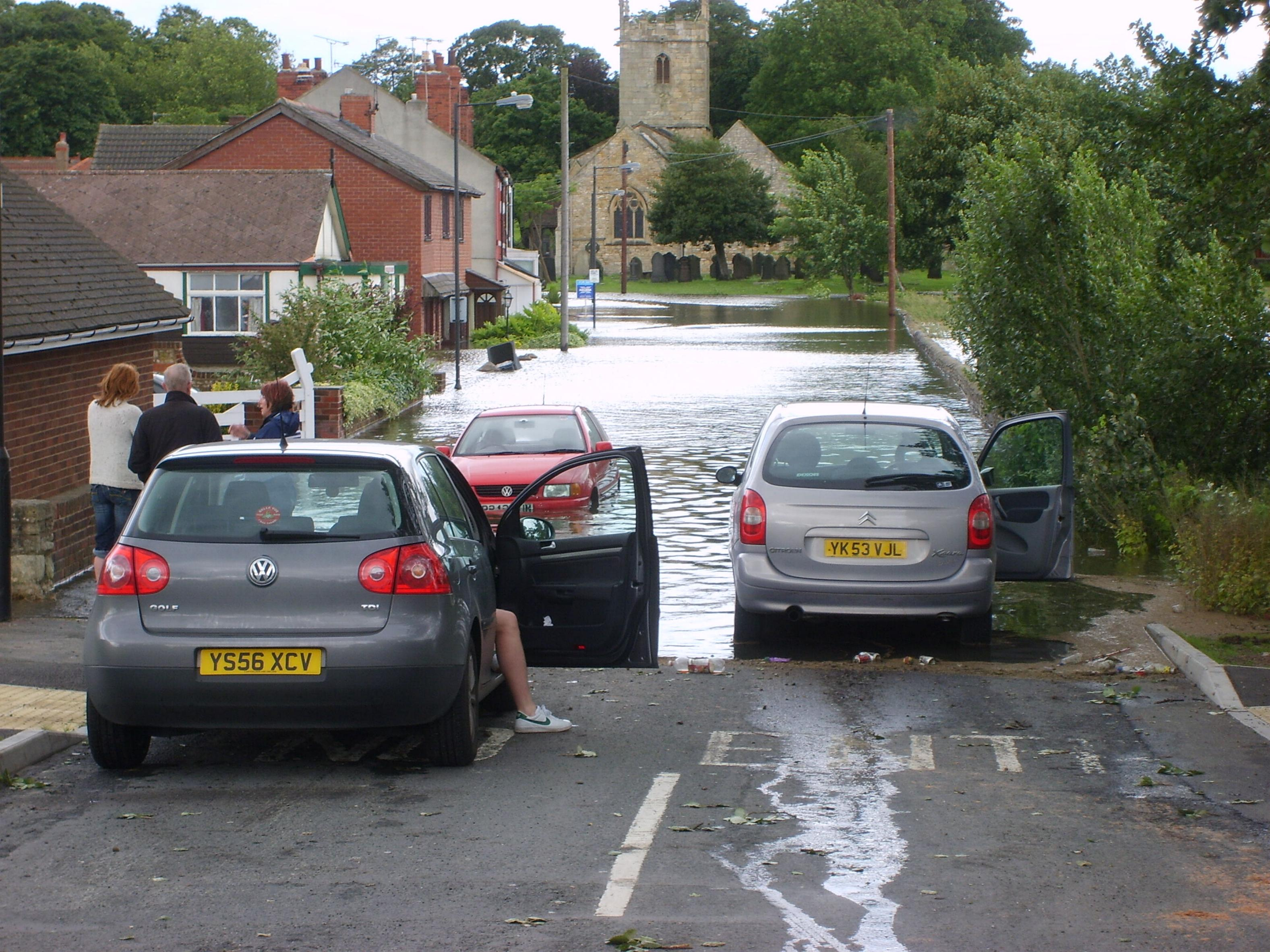
Floods in June 2007

The old village is on the B1220 road, and meets the A638 road to the south of the village at Adwick Grange, near the Highwayman pub. To the west is the parish of Brodsworth. Highfields Country Park is adjacent to Brodsworth. The parish boundary with Brodsworth is mostly the Roman Ridge, except for a small section adjacent to Pickburn, where it extends out to the A1(M) near the country park, and follows Long Lands Lane from the motorway bypass.

To the north, the parish boundary follows the Old Ea Beck, broadly following the ECML railway. It then follows a drain under Adwick Lane, then Langthwaite Drain under the ECML, to the Highwayman roundabout; this roundabout is the southern edge of the (religious, no longer civil) parish of Adwick along the A638. The division between Woodlands and Adwick parish follows just east of the A638, to the west of the secondary school, meeting the A638 at the Red House junction.

The Woodlands parish from Hangthwaite meets the A638 further south near the former Long Edge Quarry, then follows Green Lane (B6422) until a point just east of Scawthorpe, where it meets the Roman Ridge. It follows the present Roman Ridge north and along the present-day parish boundary to the A1(M). It follows the A1(M) all the way to the Red House junction (38), including the Red House industrial park, whereas the present-day parish boundary (with Brodsworth) follows the Roman Ridge, north of Long Lands Lane past Markham Grange garden centre.

=== Rail ===
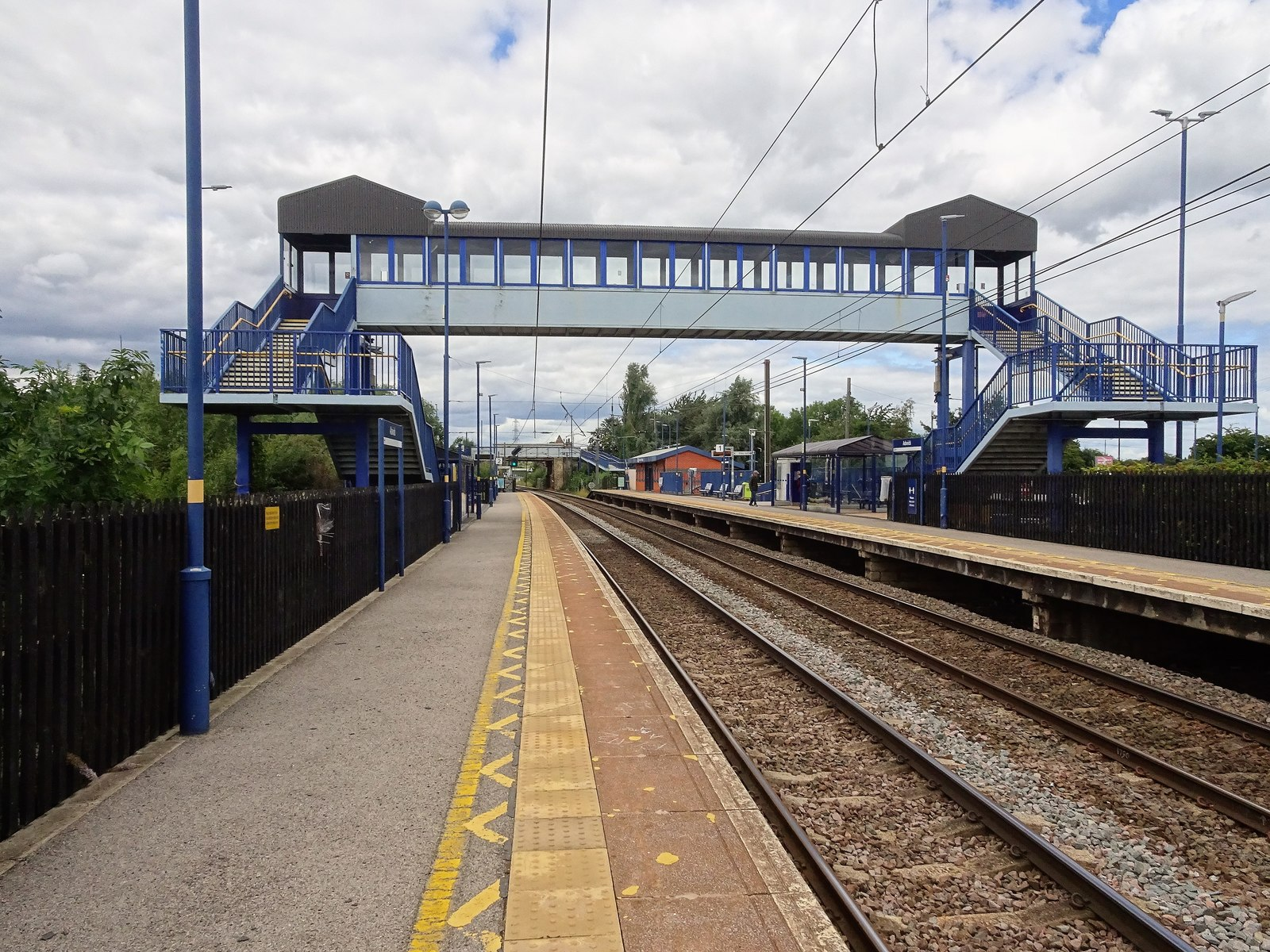
Adwick Station

Adwick, is on the electrified line part of the East Coast Main Line to Wakefield and Leeds. It is also the terminus for trains from Sheffield, via Doncaster. Just north of the station, is an east–west connecting freight-only line that originates just outside Hatfield and Stainforth, passing the former Thorpe Marsh Power Station. The railway station originally closed in 1967 and re-opened in 1993. The village, on occasion, has flooded. In 2007 the East Coast Main Line was under feet of water.

== Economy ==
The Foresters Arms

In the past, there was a pub in the village called the Red House. This was north of the main village, on the former A1 (now the A638), and gave its name to the Red House interchange (former roundabout before 1979) of the A1(M) and A638; nearby is the Red House industrial park. Until August 1961, the A1 passed through the parish. On the nearby Red House industrial park, next to the A1(M), is a B&Q distribution centre, and the headquarters of dfs. The industrial park is in the parish of Brodsworth.

== Education ==
Park Primary School (Caxton Road frontage)

On Windmill Balk Lane was Outwood Academy Adwick, an academy, since 1 September 2009. This replaced North Doncaster Technology College. Previous to this it had been Adwick School which had made a successful bid for Technology College status in 2001. Before that it was the co-educational Percy Jackson Grammar School of 1939, which became a comprehensive (Adwick School) in 1968 when it merged with Adwick High School of 1965. On 25 February 2013, a new Outwood Academy building, adjacent to the A638, was completed and opened to pupils. The unused complex of old school buildings on the site was demolished and new outdoor sporting facilities and Sports Hall provided on the 'Old School' field. Immediately to the north of Outwood Academy, stands the newly built Outwood Institute of Education offering leadership, professional development and training to young people. On the southern side of Windmill Balk Lane is Park Primary School opposite the Outwood Academy Entrance and tennis courts.

== See also ==
- Listed buildings in Adwick le Street and Carcroft
- Adwick upon Dearne, a village and civil parish, to the west, also in Doncaster
