= Listed buildings in Adwick le Street and Carcroft =

Adwick le Street and Carcroft is a ward in the metropolitan borough of Doncaster, South Yorkshire, England. The ward contains 33 listed buildings recorded in the National Heritage List for England. Of these, one is listed at Grade II*, the middle grade, and the others are at Grade II, the lowest grade. The ward includes the villages of Adwick le Street and Carcroft, along with the surrounding area. Most of the listed buildings are in the model village of Woodlands, which consists of houses built for the Brodsworth Colliery Company and designed by Percy Houfton in Arts and Crafts style. Also in the model village are a church and two schools. Elsewhere in the ward, the listed buildings include an older church, the remains of a churchyard cross and a memorial in the churchyard, a former water mill, a large house later used as a club, a war memorial in the form of a clock tower, and a miners' welfare institute.

== Key ==
Grade	Criteria
II*	Particularly important buildings of more than special interest
II	Buildings of national importance and special interest

== Buildings ==
Name and location	Photograph	Date	Notes	Grade
St Laurence's Church; 53.57121°N 1.18453°W		12th century	The church was extended and altered through the centuries, and was restored in 1862 and 1875. It is built in limestone with stone slate roofs, and consists of a nave, a north aisle, a south porch, a chancel with north chapel and vestry, and a west tower. The tower is in Perpendicular style, and has two stages, diagonal buttresses, a three-light west window, a clock face, a string course with an image niche, cusped two-light bell openings, gargoyles, and an embattled parapet with crocketed pinnacles.	II*
Churchyard cross 53.57107°N 1.18458°W	—	Late medieval (probable)	The remains of the cross are in the churchyard of St Laurence's Church, and in magnesian limestone. There is a platform of large stones on which is a cross base with chamfered corners. On the top is a square socket containing a truncated chamfered shaft.	II
Mill building and tunnel arch 53.57389°N 1.18416°W	—	1768 (probable)	A former water mill, it is in magnesian limestone with quoins and a stone slate roof. There are three storeys, two bays, and a two-storey rear wing. It contains round-arched doorways in the lower two floors, and casement windows. To the left of the rear wing is a tail-race tunnel with a segmental arch and a keystone.	II
Woodlands Park Club; 53.559002°N 1.18922°W	—	c. 1791	A large house, later a club, it is in painted magnesian limestone, on a plinth, with a sill band, an eaves cornice, a pediment over the middle three bays, and a hipped Welsh slate roof. There are three storeys, five bays, and recessed two-storey one-bay pavilions. In the centre is a doorway with a fanlight, flanked by canted bay windows. The windows in the middle floor are sashes, and the top floor contains casement windows. In the ground floor of the pavilions is a round-arched recess containing a window, and in the right return is a 19th-century porch.	II
Cholera memorial 53.57134°N 1.18438°W	—	c. 1832	The memorial is against the east wall of St Laurence's Church, and is in magnesian limestone. It consists of an upright slab about 1.6 metres (5 ft 3 in) high with a cut-off triangular head. On the slab is an inscription to the memory of the five people who died as a result of a cholera epidemic in 1832.	II
5 and 6 The Park; 53.55968°N 1.19174°W	—	1907–08	A pair of roughcast semi-detached houses with tile roofs designed by Percy Houfton. They have two storeys, and each house is gabled with two bays. The central doorways have canopies on brackets, and No. 6 has a porch. The windows are casements with hood moulds.	II
7–10 The Park; 53.55950°N 1.19185°W	—	1907–08	A row of four roughcast houses with tile roofs designed by Percy Houfton. They have two storeys, and each house has two bays; the outer houses are gabled. The doorways have canopies on scrolled brackets, and No. 8 has an added porch. The windows are casements, most with hood moulds.	II
Terry Holt Cottage; 53.56121°N 1.19291°W	—	1907–08	A detached house designed by Percy Houfton, it is roughcast with a pantile roof. There are two storeys and two bays, with the front and sides gabled. On the front is a gabled porch, and the windows are casements.	II
2–8 Central Avenue; 53.56332°N 1.19918°W	—	1908	A row of four houses designed by Percy Houfton in red brick, partly roughcast, with tile roofs. There are two storeys and six bays, the outer houses projecting as gabled cross-wings, and the central bays are also gabled. In the gable of the left house is a pair of slit vents under a cornice. The doorways have canopies on scrolled brackets, and windows are casements, some with hood moulds.	II
27 and 29 Central Avenue; 53.56470°N 1.19921°W	—	1908	A pair of mirror-image semi-detached houses designed by Percy Houfton. They are in brick on the ground floor, and roughcast above, with a tile roof, two storeys and four bays. Each house has a gabled front, and contains a central doorway with a wooden canopy on curved brackets. The windows are casements with hood moulds.	II
31–37 Central Avenue; 53.56491°N 1.19937°W	—	1908	A row of four roughcast houses designed by Percy Houfton with tile roofs, and two storeys. Each house has two bays, and a central round-headed doorway with rock-faced quoined jambs. The windows are casements, most with hood moulds, those in the ground floor rising over the doorways. In each gable is a plaque with a cross under a hood mould.	II
87 and 89 Great North Road; 53.56663°N 1.19767°W	—	1908	A pair of mirror-image semi-detached houses designed by Percy Houfton. They are roughcast, with a tile roof, two storeys and four bays. Each house has a gabled front, and contains a central doorway with a wooden canopy on shaped brackets. The windows are casements with hood moulds.	II
15 and 17 Green Lane; 53.56448°N 1.19796°W	—	1908	A pair of mirror-image semi-detached houses designed by Percy Houfton. They are roughcast, with a tile roof, two storeys and four bays. Each house has a gabled front, and contains a central doorway with a wooden canopy on curved brackets. The windows are casements with hood moulds.	II
26–32 Green Lane; 53.56373°N 1.19984°W	—	1908	A group of four houses designed by Percy Houfton, they are in roughcast brick with tile roofs. There are two storeys and six bays. The outer houses project and are gabled. The doorways in the outer houses have canopies on scrolled brackets, and No. 28 has a 20th-century porch. Most of the windows are casements.	II
27 and 29 Green Lane; 53.56436°N 1.19872°W	—	1908	A pair of mirror-image semi-detached houses designed by Percy Houfton. They are roughcast, with a tile roof, two storeys and four bays. Each house has a gabled front, and contains a central doorway with a wooden canopy on curved brackets. No. 29 has a modern gabled porch, and the windows are casements.	II
34–38 Green Lane; 53.56461°N 1.20019°W	—	1908	A row of three houses designed by Percy Houfton. They are in roughcast brick, with a tile roof, two storeys and four bays. The outer houses project and are gabled. The doorways of Nos. 36 and 38 have doorways with wooden canopies on curved brackets, and the windows are casements.	II
17–19 Quarry Lane; 53.56299°N 1.19971°W		1908	A row of three houses designed by Percy Houfton, they are in red brick, partly rendered and roughcast, and have a tile roof. There are two storeys, each house has two bays, and over the middle house is a gable. The doorways have canopies on curved brackets. The inner bay of each outer house has a two-storey canted bay window, and the other windows are casements.	II
33 and 35 The Crescent; 53.56427°N 1.20176°W	—	1908	A pair of mirror-image semi-detached houses designed by Percy Houfton. They are roughcast, with a tile roof, two storeys and four bays. Each house has a gabled front, and contains a central doorway with a wooden canopy on curved brackets. The windows are casements with hood moulds.	II
45 and 47 The Crescent; 53.56472°N 1.20194°W	—	1908	A pair of mirror-image semi-detached houses designed by Percy Houfton. They are roughcast, with a tile roof, two storeys and four bays. Each house has a gabled front, and contains a central doorway with a wooden canopy on curved brackets. The windows are casements with hood moulds.	II
49–53 The Crescent; 53.56492°N 1.20192°W	—	1908	A row of three houses designed by Percy Houfton, they are in red brick, partly rendered and roughcast, and have a tile roof. There are two storeys, each house has two bays, and over the middle house is a gable with a lozenge motif. The doorways have canopies on curved brackets. The inner bay of each outer house has a two-storey canted bay window, and the other windows are casements.	II
64 and 66 The Crescent; 53.56486°N 1.20247°W	—	1908	A pair of mirror-image semi-detached houses designed by Percy Houfton. They are in red brick and roughcast, with a tile roof, two storeys and four bays. Each house has a gabled front, and contains a central doorway with a wooden canopy on curved brackets. The windows are casements with hood moulds.	II
65 and 67 The Crescent; 53.56589°N 1.20141°W	—	1908	A pair of mirror-image semi-detached houses designed by Percy Houfton. They are in roughcast brick, with a hipped tile roof, two storeys and four bays, and a gable over the middle two bays. Above the doorways are hood moulds, and the windows are casements.	II
73 and 75 The Crescent; 53.56613°N 1.20100°W	—	1908	A pair of mirror-image semi-detached houses designed by Percy Houfton. They are in roughcast brick, with a hipped tile roof, two storeys and four bays, and a gable over the middle two bays. Above the doorways are hood moulds, and the windows are casements.	II
113 and 115 The Crescent; 53.56539°N 1.19787°W	—	1908	A pair of mirror-image semi-detached houses designed by Percy Houfton. They are in roughcast brick, with a hipped tile roof, two storeys and four bays, and a gable over the middle two bays. Above the doorways are hood moulds, and the windows are casements.	II
129–135 The Crescent; 53.56475°N 1.19737°W	—	1908	A group of four houses designed by Percy Houfton, they are in red brick and partly roughcast, with tile roofs. There are two storeys and six bays. The outer houses project and have hipped roofs, and over the middle two bays is a gable containing a date plate and a cornice. The doorways have canopies on scrolled brackets. Most of the windows are casements, some with tile hood moulds, and on the inner sides of the middle doorways are oval windows.	II
1–7 Harold Avenue; 53.56706°N 1.20024°W	—	1908	A row of four roughcast houses with tile roofs and two storeys designed by Percy Houfton. Each house has two bays, and the outer houses are gabled. The doorways are in the centre with rock-faced quoined jambs and a stepped lintel. The lintels in the outer houses have a shield with a cross, and the lintels in the middle houses are peaked and contain a lozenge. The windows are casements.	II
23 and 25 West Avenue; 53.56558°N 1.20324°W	—	1908	A pair of mirror-image semi-detached houses designed by Percy Houfton. They are in roughcast brick, with a tile roof, two storeys and four bays, and a gable over the middle two bays. The doorways have canopies on curved brackets, and the windows are casements, most with hood moulds.	II
Woodside Cottages; 53.56144°N 1.19842°W	—	1908	A pair of mirror-image semi-detached houses designed by Percy Houfton. They are in red brick with a later pantile roof, and two storeys. Each house has two bays, and a gable over the middle two bays containing a date plaque with a cornice. In the outer bays are two-storey canted bay windows, inside which are doorways, and the other windows are casements.	II
Woodlands First School; 53.56262°N 1.19602°W		c. 1910	The school is in red brick with limestone dressings and a red tile roof, and is in Arts and Crafts style. There is a two-storey assembly hall, with twin single-storey classroom wings on three sides. The entrance stone portico has a moulded segmental arch and a coped parapet. It is flanked by gabled wings with lozenge motifs, and blocks with segmental parapets. On the hall is a large octagonal ventilator with balustraded sides, a cornice, and a lead ogee dome, and there are smaller ventilators on the classroom wings.	II
Woodlands Middle School; 53.56215°N 1.19631°W	—	c. 1910	The school is in red brick with limestone dressings and a red tile roof, and is in Arts and Crafts style. There is a single storey and a symmetrical front with three gabled classrooms, flanked by segmental arched entrances with parapets. At the rear is a taller assembly hall with gabled dormers. On the hall is a large octagonal ventilator with balustraded sides, a cornice, and a lead ogee dome, and there are smaller ventilators on the classroom wings.	II
All Saints Church; 53.56270°N 1.19883°W		1911–13	The church is in red brick with sandstone dressings and tile roofs. It consists of a nave with a clerestory, north and south aisles, a chancel with a north chapel and south organ chamber and vestry, and a northwest tower. The tower has four square stages, two octagonal stages, and a needle spire. It has clasping buttresses, a north doorway with a lintel and keystone, two-light louvred bell openings, and an embattled parapet. The turret has clock faces and an openwork parapet, and the spire is recessed.	II
Highfields War Memorial Clock Tower; 53.55583°N 1.18096°W		1922	The war memorial is a four stage clock tower 8.53 metres (28.0 ft) high. It is in sandstone, with a base of two steps, a plinth, and a slightly tapering pedestal with quoins. Above this is a clock face, and a belfry with round arches on the sides, and a dome with a knob finial. There are moulded cornices between the stages, and on the front of the pedestal is an oval wreath in relief. On the front of the plinth is a red marble tablet with an inscription and the names of those lost in the First World War, and under it is a tablet with the names of those lost in the Second World War.	II
Miners' Welfare Institute; 53.56085°N 1.18852°W		1924	The building is in red brick, partly rendered, with faience dressings and Welsh slate roofs. There is a single storey and a front of nine bays. It has a moulded plinth, a sill band, corner pilasters, and a moulded entablature. In the centre is an arch with a moulded keystone and ornate spandrels, flanked by panels, and with a parapet containing a sunken inscribed and dated panel. Along the top of the building are piers, with wrought iron railings between them.	II
