= Carcroft =

Village in South Yorkshire, England

Coordinates: 53.58°N 1.17°W

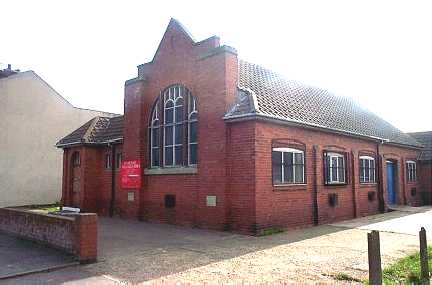
- St Michael and All The Angels Church

- Location within South Yorkshire
- Population: 4,312
- OS grid reference: SE540098
- Civil parish: Carcroft
- Metropolitan borough: Doncaster
- Metropolitan county: South Yorkshire
- Region: Yorkshire and the Humber
- Country: England
- Sovereign state: United Kingdom
- Post town: DONCASTER
- Postcode district: DN6
- Dialling code: 01302
- Police: South Yorkshire
- Fire: South Yorkshire
- Ambulance: Yorkshire
- UK Parliament: Doncaster North

Carcroft is a rural village in the City of Doncaster, South Yorkshire, England. Historically part of the West Riding of Yorkshire, the village is roughly 6 miles (10 km) north-north west of Doncaster. At the time of the 2011 Census the village fell within the ward of Adwick le Street & Carcroft in the Doncaster MBC.

At the 2021 census, the combined population of Carcroft and its neighbour Skellow was 7,823. In 2023, the Get Doncaster Moving website published a document citing Skellow's population alone as 3,800 at the time. This would suggest that Carcroft currently has a population close to 4,023 on its own, making it the second most populous of the villages in the ward after Woodlands.

== Geography ==
It borders woodland to the north which separates it from the neighbouring village of Owston. To the west the village merges with Skellow having subsumed the areas previously known as Hobcroft and Bullcroft. A string of small industrial estates connect it with Adwick le Street to the south. East of the village lies mixed farmland and woodland.

Like its neighbour to the west much of Carcroft is made up of former council housing estates (most of which had been colliery company housing). The old centre of the village remains with High Street supporting a variety of small independent shops. The furniture retailer DFS also began here as Northern Upholstery and a large outlet for the firm still stands on a small trading estate just off High Street opposite an Asda superstore. DFS Head office, factory and distribution centre is based a mile away at Adwick le Street. The village had a library until it was closed down in 2012.

== History ==
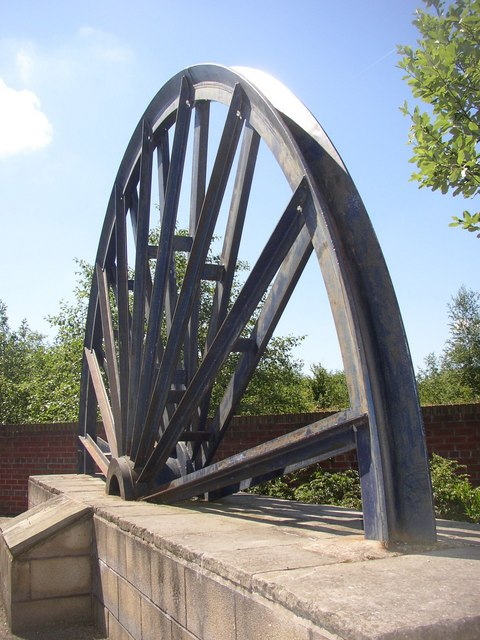
The Bullcroft memorial

A small portion of Carcroft is redeveloped land that had been occupied by the Bullcroft Colliery which operated from 1912 until 1970 when it was merged underground with nearby Brodsworth Colliery. The viability of reopening this coal face has been under investigation however as yet no moves to restore mining in the area have been made.

The village has two churches - the Church of England St Michael & all the Angels church, and the Catholic St George & the English Martyrs.

== See also ==
- Listed buildings in Adwick le Street and Carcroft
