= Spiratone =

Spiratone (defunct)
- Company type: Company
- Industry: Imaging
- Founded: Manhattan, New York
- Headquarters: Manhattan, New York
- Key people: Fred Spira, Founder
- Products: Accessories for cameras and film development equipment

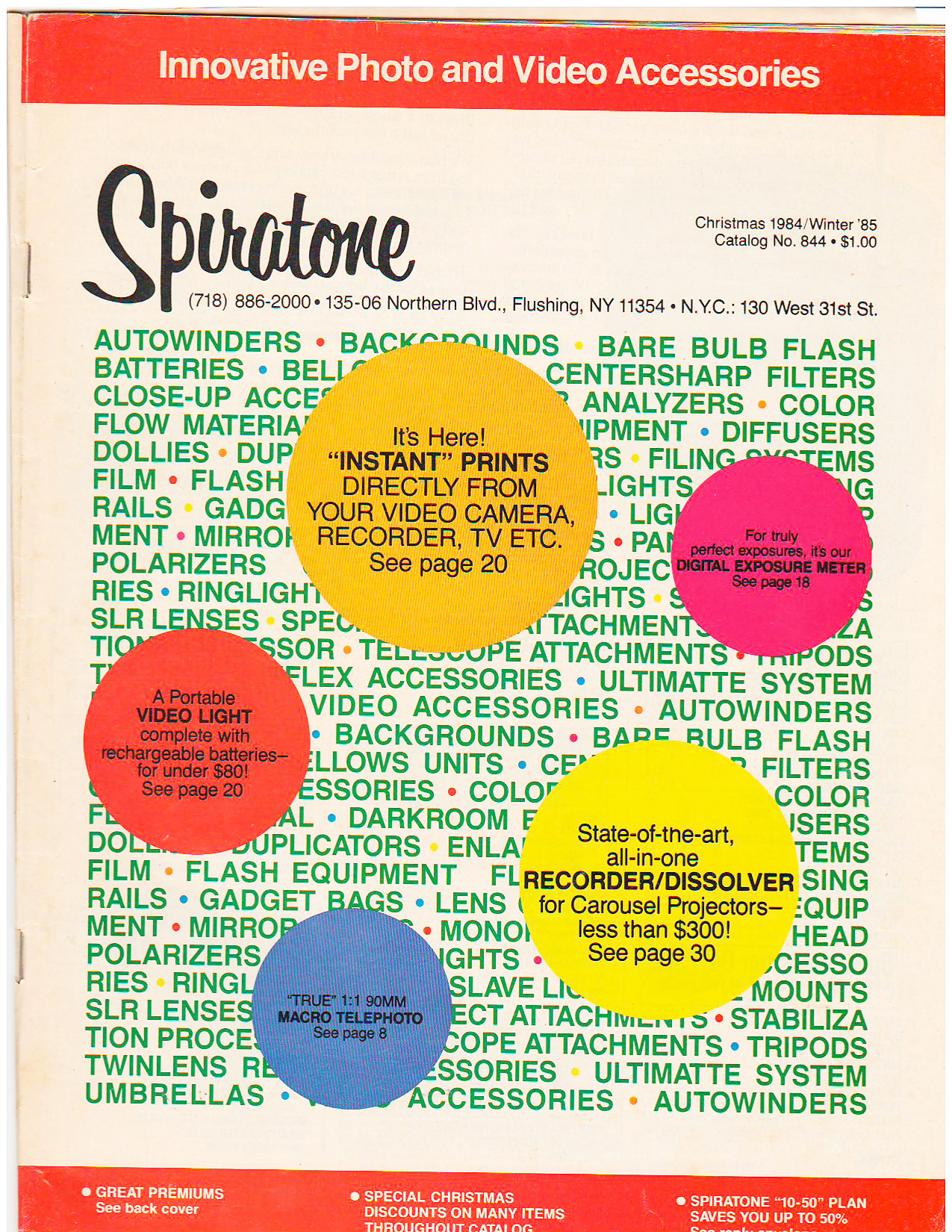
Spiratone catalog, 1984

Spiratone was a company specializing in low-cost lenses and filters for cameras, lighting, and darkroom equipment.

The company was started by Fred Spira in 1941 in the bathroom of his parents' apartment where he developed film. In 1946, it relocated to a large loft on West 27th Street in Manhattan and then grew to a successful multimillion-dollar company. Mail orders were filled from their larger warehouse store on Northern Blvd. in Flushing, Queens.

Spiratone was an innovator in the industry, being one of the first companies to import Japanese photo equipment to the United States. It also became widely known as a distributor of odd, unique, or novelty photographic equipment such as Color Pre-tinted Black & White Photographic Printing Paper and the right-angled spy lens. Other popular items included a very inexpensive 400mm telephoto lens and a stabilization processor.

According to Herbert Keppler, tests of Spiratone lenses "often proved them equal to or superior to that of famous manufacturers' own products." Well-known photographer and writer Norman Rothschild used Spiratone lenses and filters for many of his photographs that appeared in the pages of Popular Photography magazine where he served as a writer and editor for a third of a century.

The company was very successful during the 1950s and 60s and then eventually declined due to competition, closing after being acquired by another company in 1990, three years after Mr. Spira retired in 1987.
