= Bullcroft Colliery =

Former coal mine in South Yorkshire, England

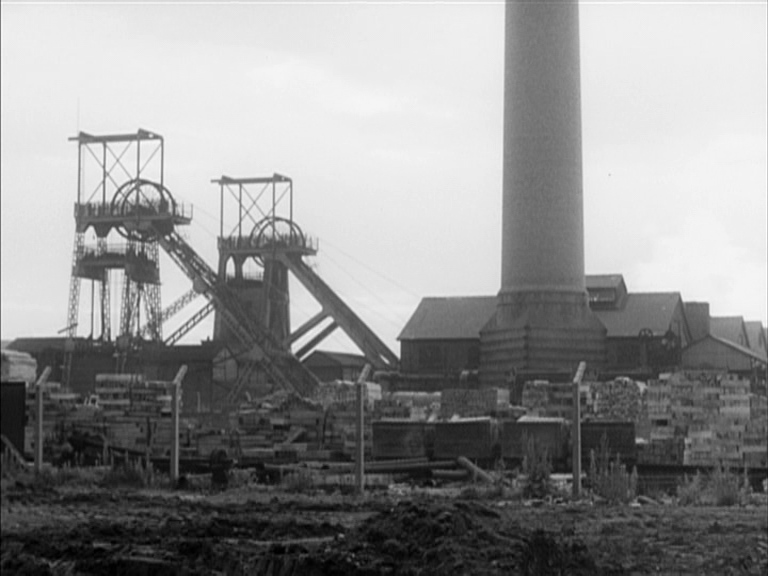
- Bullcroft Colliery around 1967

- Location within South Yorkshire

Location
- Location: Carcroft, South Yorkshire, England; 53.581932°N 1.186288°W

Production
- Products: Coal
- Production: 700,000 tonnes (770,000 tons)
- Financial year: 1930–1931

History
- Opened: 1908 (coaling began in 1911)
- Closed: 1970

Owner
- Company: Bullcroft Main Colliery Ltd; Doncaster Amalgamated Collieries Ltd; British Coal

Bullcroft Colliery was a coal mine situated by the village of Carcroft north of Doncaster. It operated from 1908 to 1970.

== History ==
The Bullcroft Colliery Company was formed in April 1908 and sinking of the shafts commenced immediately. In January 1909, at a depth of 100 feet (30 m), a water course yielding over 1,000 US gallons (3,800 L) per minute was struck, it was capped back and sinking continued but only a month later, at 180 feet (55 m), another water course, big enough to be described as a "subterranean river", was struck - too much for the steam operated pumps to cope with. Electric pumps were brought in to cope with the flow but even with a capability of 6,250 US gallons (23,700 L) per minute they couldn't cope and sinking was stopped so the full situation could be assessed.

It was decided to withdraw the pumps and freeze the ground. Commencing January 1910 the first freeze was unsuccessful and a second, after the shafts had iron "tubbing" installed, commenced in February 1911. This was successful, and sinking recommenced finally reaching the coal measures in December 1911 at 657 yards (601 m) below the surface.

Before the colliery company arrived, the nearby settlement of Carcroft consisted of only 50 houses. By 1910, an additional 400 houses had been erected to cope with the influx of miners and their families.

Between 1908 and 1940 the company traded as Bullcroft Main Colliery Ltd. It merged with five other collieries (Brodsworth, Hickleton, Markham Main and Yorkshire Main) in 1940 to form the Doncaster Amalgamated Collieries Ltd. In 1947, the enterprise was nationalised into British Coal.

The colliery worked normally until 1968 when it was joined to Brodsworth Colliery by a 550-yard (500 m) drift and a 1,800-yard (1,600 m) long conveyor made it possible that Bullcroft coal could be brought up at Brodsworth for washing etc.

The collieries officially merged in 1970, with the final shift clocking off on 25 September of that year. As the last remaining seam could be reached via the Brodsworth Colliery, the Bullcroft shafts were filled, using spoil from pit heaps and capped. Bullcroft Colliery kept its landsale depot to deal with concessionary coal and retained a locomotive to work it for about a year afterwards.

The colliery was served by a branch off the Hull and Barnsley and Great Central Joint Railway and a connection to the West Riding and Grimsby Railway.

The colliery had its own football team, which competed in the FA Cup on numerous occasions.

== Accidents ==
On 20 March 1923, John William Severn Carlin aged 20 was crushed by a tub that he had uncoupled from the front, the incline from the mine entrance was steep, the tub ran away with him still in the kneeling position and crushed him against the stationery tubs, he sustained broken femur and internal injuries, he died at Doncaster Infirmary after surgery of shock and exhaustion. The coroner gave a verdict of accidental death and asked that the colliery ensure that tubs are uncoupled from behind in future. John left a wife of three years.

On 13 January 1937, Kenneth Oliver, 14, was killed in accident whilst he was uncoupling tubs from the internal conveyor system. Oliver was under adult supervision, but his death lead to questions being raised in Parliament about boys working in mines.

On 19 October 1941, six men died whilst trying to deal with problems within the mine. An ignition of gas just after 3:00 am caused an explosion and killed the men outright. They were about 430 feet (130 m) distant from the shaft bottom and all, bar one, had been members of the mine rescue team.

== Post-mine land use ==
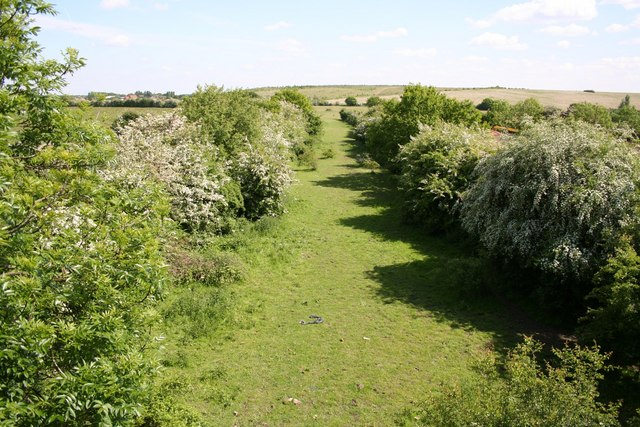
Trackbed of the former Bullcroft Colliery branch line near Toll Bar

The 76 acres (31 ha) of land that the colliery occupied above ground is now used as a community parkland. There was a proposal in 2013 to sift the spoil for usable coal. However, the price of coal fell soon afterwards and the plan was abandoned. The local community want the area to be landscaped and the spoil tip removed as has happened at other neighbouring collieries such as Askern, Bentley and Brodsworth.
