= Outwood Academy Adwick =

Location
- Windmill Balk Lane; Woodlands; Doncaster, South Yorkshire, DN6 7SF; England; 53.56578°N 1.19556°W

Information
- Type: Academy
- Motto: "Students First"
- School district: South Yorkshire
- Local authority: Doncaster
- Trust: Outwood Grange Academies Trust
- Department for Education URN: 135963 Tables
- Ofsted: Reports
- Chair: Judy Parker
- Principal: Vicky Gray
- Gender: Mixed
- Age: 11 to 18
- Enrolment: 1,080 as of January 2024
- Capacity: 1,300
- Colours: Purple and gold
- Website: adwick.outwood.com

Outwood Academy Adwick is a mixed secondary school and sixth form with academy status located in Woodlands, South Yorkshire, England. It has a comprehensive admissions policy, with 1,080 pupils on roll as of 2024.

The school is operated by Outwood Grange Academies Trust, and the current principal is Vicky Gray.

== History ==
By its Resolution 39 of 28 April 1931, for the purpose of building the new school the Education Committee of the West Riding County Council decided to purchase 21 acres of land in Windmill Balk Lane, Adwick le Street from the owner of Brodsworth Hall. The school was founded by J. W. 'Jimmy' Lane JP (1877–1969), alderman of the West Riding and a check weighman at Brodsworth Colliery. It was named after alderman Sir Percy Jackson, an active proponent of education on the West Riding County Council in the 1920s and 1930s. Designed as a co-educational state grammar school, the Percy Jackson Grammar School was housed in modern Art Deco style premises. The two-storey building was designed to accommodate 540 pupils and was constructed of steel framing, bearing concrete floors and flat roofs. The total cost of the site, buildings and equipment was approximately £62,000.

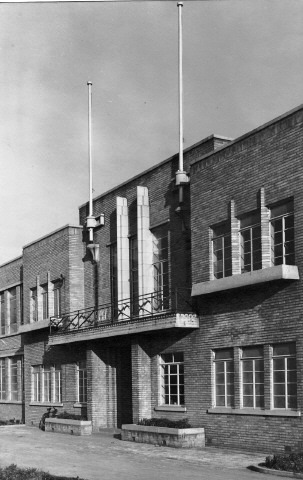
School frontage in 1944

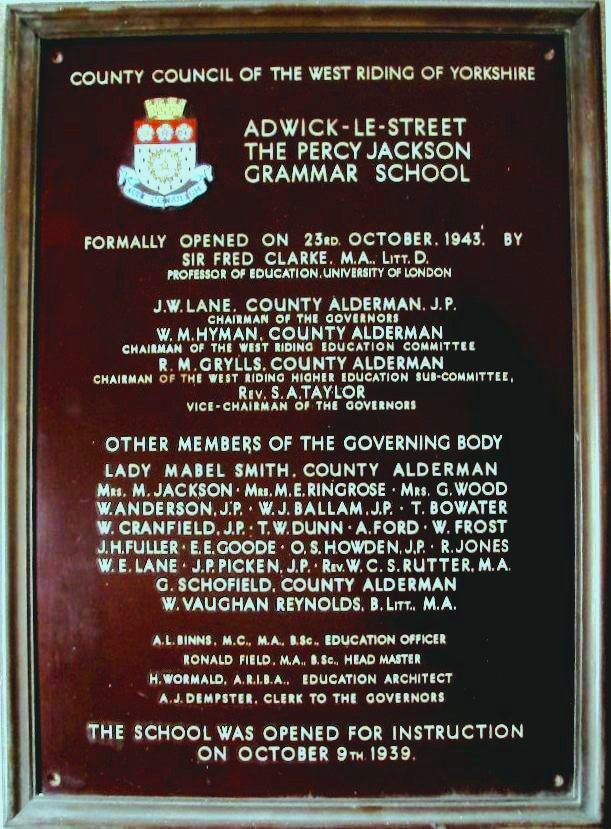
Opening Plaque

The school opened for instruction on 9 October 1939, just weeks after the outbreak of World War II. The first year's intake of pupils was 86, many being transferred from other schools in the area. Of these, 62 joined the first form and the others the second and third forms. Whilst the school was recruiting pupils, there was space for wartime evacuees and these came from the London area as well as from Hull. The Riley High School in Hull evacuated 100 boys and six teachers and operated as a parallel school within the premises. Two boys from mainland Europe arrived via the Kindertransport one of whom was Siegfried Franz Spira later known as Fred Spira. Several teachers saw service in World War II, notably Capt W. R. F. Cockroft, Military Cross, and Fl Lt L. F. Belton, Distinguished Flying Cross.

The school was not formally opened until 23 October 1943 (see image of Opening Plaque). Not until five years later was the planned capacity reached and then in 1948 four prefab classrooms were added. In 1954 the new science block was opened with additional laboratories, domestic science rooms and four extra classrooms. The final school population levelled out at around 900 – almost double the original plan. Known as the Percy Jackson Grammar School from 1939, the school became comprehensive in 1968 when it merged with Adwick High School, a Secondary Modern School which was located next door. The new school was renamed Adwick School.

The school was later granted specialist status as a Technology College and was renamed North Doncaster Technology College.

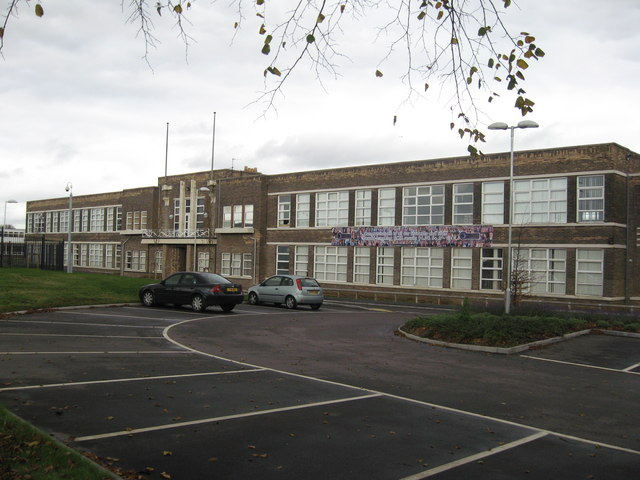
Facade of original Outwood Academy Adwick building, viewed across its car park in 2009

The original Art Deco school premises were demolished in 2013.

The school converted to academy status in September 2009 and was renamed Outwood Academy Adwick.

In October 2011, work began on a £16 million rebuild. The new school site opened to pupils in February 2013.

== Academics ==
The school is subjected to the same National Curriculum restriction found in all UK state-schools, it aims to give all Key Stage 3 students a broad introduction to academic life while catering for their individual interests. In 2016 this was classified by Ofsted as an outstanding school, In 2017–18 the Key Stage 4 results dipped, but the sixth form results held steady. Ofsted was complimentary of the general standard of teaching but found a couple of subjects that were not using the available internal results to correctly target the work set to the more able students. Ofsted was convinced that the trust and local management were addressing the problem.

== Notable former members ==
=== Former teachers ===
- Brian O'Malley (History), Became a Labour MP and Minister of State for Health & Social Security, introduced SERPS:State Earnings-Related Pension Scheme.

=== Former pupils ===
- Fred Spira (1939 entrant), businessman.
- Raymond Hide CBE FRS (1940 entrant), Professor of Physics.
- Richard Lumb (1961 entrant), Cricketer (batsman) for Yorkshire
- Roy Cromack (1950 entrant), Road Cyclist
- Derrick Downing (1957 entrant), Professional Footballer.
- Ros Jones (Ros Cavnor, 1961 entrant), Mayor of Doncaster.
- Stan Brookes (1964 entrant), Professional Footballer.
- Ricky Ravenhill (1993 entrant), Professional Footballer.
