= DN postcode area =

Postcode area within the United Kingdom

Doncaster
- Postcode area
- Coordinates: 53.542°N 0.725°W
- Country: United Kingdom
- Postcode area: DN
- Postcode area name: Doncaster
- Post towns: 13
- Postcode districts: 33
- Postcode sectors: 117
- Postcodes (live): 21,700
- Postcodes (total): 27,780
- Statistics as at May 2020

The DN postcode area, also known as the Doncaster postcode area, is a group of 32 postcode districts in northern England, within 13 post towns. These cover eastern South Yorkshire (including Doncaster), north Lincolnshire (including Grimsby, Scunthorpe, Barnetby, Barrow upon Humber, Barton-upon-Humber, Brigg, Cleethorpes, Gainsborough, Immingham and Ulceby), parts of north Nottinghamshire (including Retford) and the south-west of the East Riding of Yorkshire (including Goole), and a small part of southern North Yorkshire.

The S64 postcode district for Mexborough was earmarked as DN13, which has never been used. Otherwise, the area's districts are numbered sequentially up to DN22, then from DN31 to DN41 for Grimsby and surrounding settlements.

Mail for the DN postcode area is processed at Sheffield Mail Centre, along with mail for the LN, S, and HU postcode areas.

== Coverage ==
The approximate coverage of the postcode districts:

Postcode district	Post town	Coverage	Local authority area(s)
DN1	DONCASTER	Doncaster city centre, Hyde Park	Doncaster
DN2	DONCASTER	Intake, Wheatley, Wheatley Hills	Doncaster
DN3	DONCASTER	Armthorpe, Barnby Dun, Branton, Edenthorpe, Kirk Sandall	Doncaster
DN4	DONCASTER	Balby, Belle Vue, Bessacarr, Cantley, Hexthorpe, Warmsworth	Doncaster
DN5	DONCASTER	Arksey, Barnburgh, Bentley, Cadeby, Cusworth, Harlington, High Melton, Scawsby, Scawthorpe, Sprotbrough, Sunnyfields, Toll Bar	Doncaster
DN6	DONCASTER	Adwick le Street, Askern, Campsall, Carcroft, Fenwick, Moss, Norton, Sutton, Walden Stubbs, Womersley, Woodlands	Doncaster, North Yorkshire
DN7	DONCASTER	Dunsville, Dunscroft, Fishlake, Hatfield, Hatfield Woodhouse, Lindholme, Stainforth	Doncaster
DN8	DONCASTER	Moorends, Sandtoft, Thorne	Doncaster, North Lincolnshire
DN9	DONCASTER	Epworth, Finningley, Haxey, Auckley, Owston Ferry, Belton, Westwoodside, Wroot	North Lincolnshire, Doncaster
DN10	DONCASTER	Bawtry, Beckingham, Misson, Misterton, Scrooby	Bassetlaw, Doncaster
DN11	DONCASTER	Bircotes, Harworth, New Rossington, Rossington, Tickhill, Wadworth	Doncaster, Bassetlaw
DN12	DONCASTER	Conisbrough, Denaby Main, New Edlington, Old Denaby, Old Edlington	Doncaster
DN14	GOOLE	Goole, Carlton, Eggborough, Hensall, Howden, Pincheon Green, Pollington, Rawcliffe, Snaith, Sykehouse, Whitley, Whitley Bridge	East Riding of Yorkshire, North Yorkshire, Doncaster
DN15	SCUNTHORPE	Scunthorpe town centre, Alkborough, Appleby, Burton upon Stather, Coleby, Dragonby, Flixborough, Flixborough Ind Estate, Foxhills Ind Estate, Frodingham, Gunness, High Risby, High Santon, Low Risby, Low Santon, Normanby, Roxby, Thealby, West Halton, Whitton, Winteringham, Winterton	North Lincolnshire
DN16	SCUNTHORPE	Bottesford, Holme, Queensway Ind Estate, New Brumby, Old Brumby, Raventhorpe & Twigmoor	North Lincolnshire
DN17	SCUNTHORPE	Althorpe, Amcotts, Bottesford Moor, Bottesford, Crowle, Derrythorpe, Ealand, East Butterwick, Eastoft, Garthorpe, Gunness, Keadby, Luddington, Messingham, North Ewster, Susworth, West Butterwick, Yaddlethorpe	North Lincolnshire
DN18	BARTON-UPON-HUMBER	Barton-upon-Humber, South Ferriby, Horkstow	North Lincolnshire
DN19	BARROW-UPON-HUMBER	Barrow-upon-Humber, Goxhill, New Holland	North Lincolnshire
DN20	BRIGG	Brigg, Broughton, Hibaldstow, Scawby, Wrawby	North Lincolnshire
DN21	GAINSBOROUGH	Gainsborough, Kirton Lindsey, Marton, Lea, Blyton, Scotter, Scotton	West Lindsey
DN22	RETFORD	Retford, Ranskill	Bassetlaw
DN31	GRIMSBY	Grimsby town centre	North East Lincolnshire
DN32	GRIMSBY	Old Clee	North East Lincolnshire
DN33	GRIMSBY	Nunsthorpe, Scartho, Scartho Top	North East Lincolnshire
DN34	GRIMSBY	Laceby Acres, Little Coates	North East Lincolnshire
DN35	CLEETHORPES	Cleethorpes	North East Lincolnshire
DN36	GRIMSBY	Holton-le-Clay, Humberston, Ludborough, Marshchapel, New Waltham, North Cotes, North Thoresby, Tetney	East Lindsey, North East Lincolnshire
DN37	GRIMSBY	Ashby cum Fenby, Barnoldby-le-Beck, Beelsby, Bradley, Brocklesby, Great Coates, Great Limber, Irby-upon-Humber, Laceby, Waltham	North East Lincolnshire, West Lindsey
DN38	BARNETBY	Barnetby le Wold, Grasby, Searby, Somerby	North Lincolnshire, West Lindsey
DN39	ULCEBY	Ulceby, Croxton, Kirmington, Wootton	North Lincolnshire
DN40	IMMINGHAM	Immingham, North Killingholme, South Killingholme, Habrough, East Halton	North Lincolnshire, North East Lincolnshire
DN41	GRIMSBY	Healing, Keelby, Stallingborough	North East Lincolnshire, West Lindsey
DN55	DONCASTER	Royal Mail Physical-to-Electronic Centre (PTE), Royal Mail Returns Management Service	non-geographic

== Map ==
DN postcode area map, showing postcode districts in red and post towns in grey text, with links to nearby HU, LN, LS, NG, S, WF and YO postcode areas.

== See also ==
- List of postcode areas in the United Kingdom
- Postcode Address File
