= Raventhorpe =

Human settlement in Lincolnshire

Coordinates: 53.5619724°N 0.5868432°W

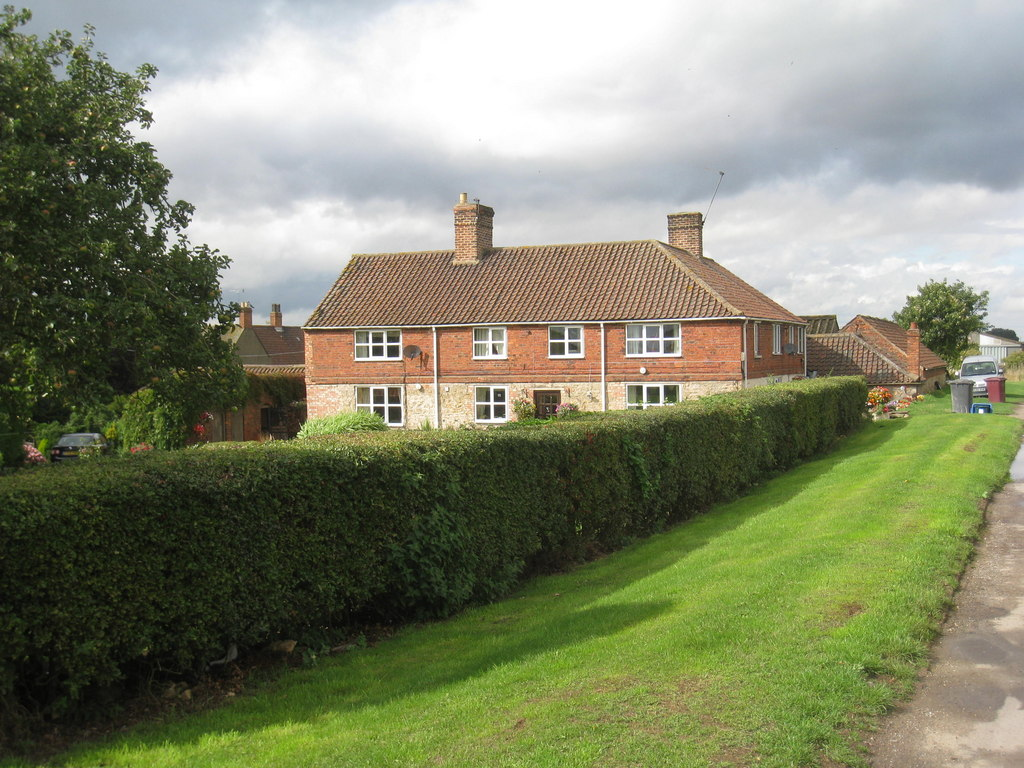
- Cottages at Raventhorpe

- Location within Lincolnshire
- Civil parish: Messingham
- Unitary authority: North Lincolnshire
- Ceremonial county: Lincolnshire
- Region: Yorkshire and the Humber
- Country: England
- Sovereign state: United Kingdom
- Police: Humberside
- Fire: Humberside
- Ambulance: East Midlands

Raventhorpe is a hamlet in the civil parish of Messingham, in the North Lincolnshire district, in the ceremonial county of Lincolnshire, England. It is located just east of Scunthorpe, and south east of Scunthorpe Steelworks, adjacent to the A18.

Raventhorpe Solar PV Park is located to the east of Raventhorpe, commissioned in March 2015 and developed by Kinetica Solar and WElink Energy UK.

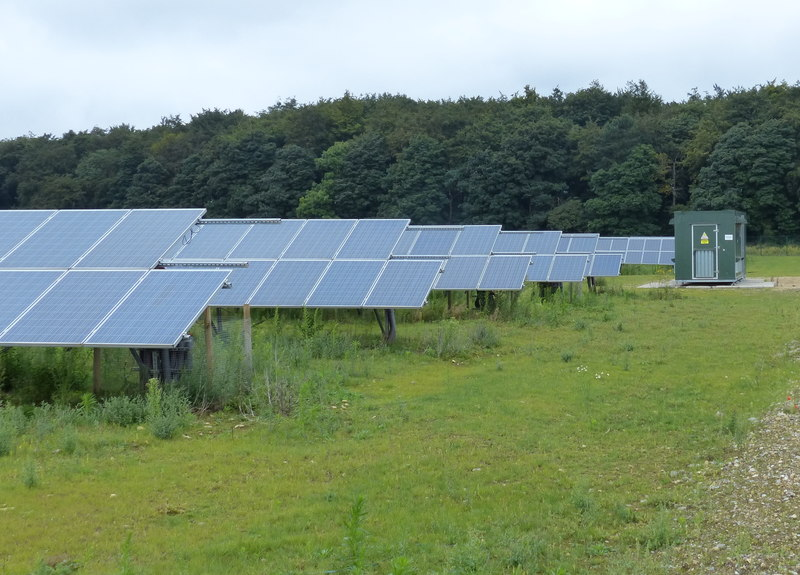
Raventhorpe Solar Park

== History ==
Raventhorpe was described in the Domesday Book as a settlement in the hundred of Manley, with 9 households in the year 1086. Immediately south west of Raventhorpe Farm is the site of a scheduled monument, which consists of medieval earthworks and the buried remains of several buildings. In the early 1870s Raventhorpe was described by John Marius Wilson in the Imperial Gazetteer of England and Wales as "a hamlet in Appleby parish, Lincoln; 4¼ miles W of Glanford-Brigg". In 1866 Raventhorpe became a separate civil parish, on 1 April 1936 the parish was abolished and merged with Holme. At the 1931 census (the last before the abolition of the parish), Raventhorpe had a population of 23.
