= Highfields, South Yorkshire =

Village in South Yorkshire, England

Coordinates: 53.555°N 1.186°W

Highfields
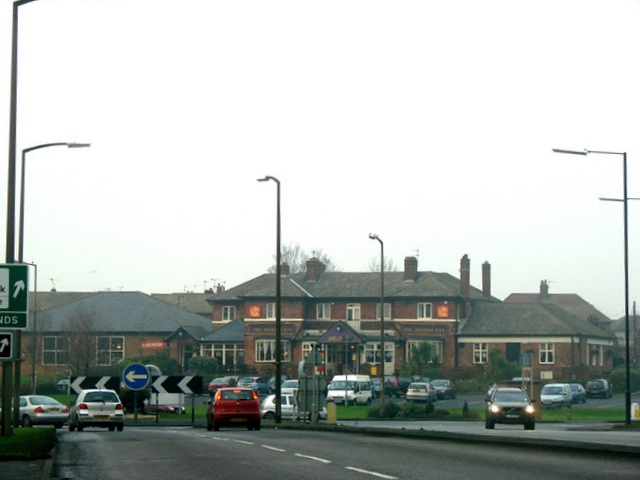
- Road junction in Highfields

- Location within South Yorkshire
- Metropolitan borough: Doncaster
- Metropolitan county: South Yorkshire
- Region: Yorkshire and the Humber
- Country: England
- Sovereign state: United Kingdom
- Post town: Doncaster
- Postcode district: DN6
- Dialling code: 01302
- Police: South Yorkshire
- Fire: South Yorkshire
- Ambulance: Yorkshire
- UK Parliament: Doncaster North

Highfields is a former coal mining village, located south of the model village of Woodlands, in South Yorkshire. Historically part of the West Riding of Yorkshire, it is part of the City of Doncaster. The village is located in the Adwick le Street & Carcroft ward of Doncaster MBC.

Although it does not currently have an air of prosperity, Highfields was built so that most houses either overlooked farmland or woodland, the ornamental Highfields Lake, or the greens in the centre of the village. Like its neighbour, Woodlands, Highfields lies between the historic Great North Road and the Roman road.

The Roman road is a branch of Ermine Street, branching off near Lincoln and rejoining near York. Although a separate branch, it is also known as Ermine Street. Locally, this stretch of the road is known as the Roman Ridge, although it is more colloquially known as the Roman Rigg.

Hanging Wood, located between Highfields and Woodlands, was one of the 'hold up' spots used by the 17th century highwayman William Nevison (also known as Swift Nick or Black Bob).

Half a mile south-east are the surviving earthworks, much overgrown, of Hangthwaite Castle, a medieval motte-and-bailey castle.

As of 2014, the village had a population of 210. For the 2021 census, its population count was combined with Adwick le Street and Woodlands, the latter of which had a confirmed population of 1,600 later in 2023.

There is a house under 34 Coppice Road Commonly referred to as Abando (abandoned).

== Notable residents ==
David Pegg (1935 - 1958) one of the Manchester United footballers who died in the Munich air disaster, was born in London.
