= Jonathan Spira =

Jonathan B. Spira (born 1961) is a researcher and industry analyst known for his work in the area of collaboration and knowledge sharing and the problem of information overload.

== Early life ==
Spira was born in New York and grew up in New York City and Vienna, the son of photographic pioneer Fred Spira and his wife Marilyn (née Hacker). He studied Central European History at the University of Pennsylvania where he was a member of the Pi Lambda Phi fraternity and conducted his graduate studies at LMU Munich.

== Career ==
Spira began his career in business and technology while still in high school when he became involved in the management of office systems at Spiratone, a company founded and run by his father, Fred Spira. After completing his studies in 1983, he founded a research and IT advisory firm, Basex (originally called The Basex Group) in 1983, that focused on helping organizations understand how knowledge workers work and what they can do to manage them more effectively. He has been associated with the firm ever since.

== Research ==
Spira's research focuses on the problems organizations are having as they migrate from the industrial age to the knowledge economy and what managers can do to remain competitive. According to Knowledge Management in the Public Sector, the main thrust of Spira's arguments is that software companies should develop new systems that are designed from the beginning for knowledge and information work but collaboration and knowledge sharing are "less a question of technology than of systems that facilitate people working together."

Spira started researching the problem of information overload in the early 1990s and was interviewed in March 1993 by CNBC on the topic. In 2003, he published research that assigned specific costs to components of the problem of information overload and in 2008 published an estimate of the cost of information overload to the U.S. economy ($900 billion per annum). In 2008, he helped found the Information Overload Research Group, a business and academic consortium that is working to bring attention to the problem and potential solutions.

== Books and publications ==
Spira is the author of Overload! How Too Much Information Is Bad For Your Organization, published by Wiley in 2011. He is also the co-author of The History of Photography (Aperture, 2001), named a "best book of the year" by the New York Times when it came out. He is the author of Managing the Knowledge Workforce: Understanding the Information Revolution That's Changing the Business World (Mercury Business Press, 2005). He has also written several major reports on information overload including Information Overload: We Have Met the Enemy and He Is Us. He is regularly quoted by publications including the New York Times, Wall Street Journal, the Financial Times, Business Week, among others.

== Sources ==
- Basex Web site
- The History of Photography
- Feder, Barnaby J. (May 28, 2001). "I.B.M. Meets With 52,600, Virtually". The New York Times.
- Business Week
- Strategic Intelligence
- Knowledge worker: Do you relate?
- Lost knowledge: file not found
- Step up to the knowledge economy
