= Scawthorpe =

Village in South Yorkshire, England

Coordinates: 53.5482°N 1.1657°W

- Suburb
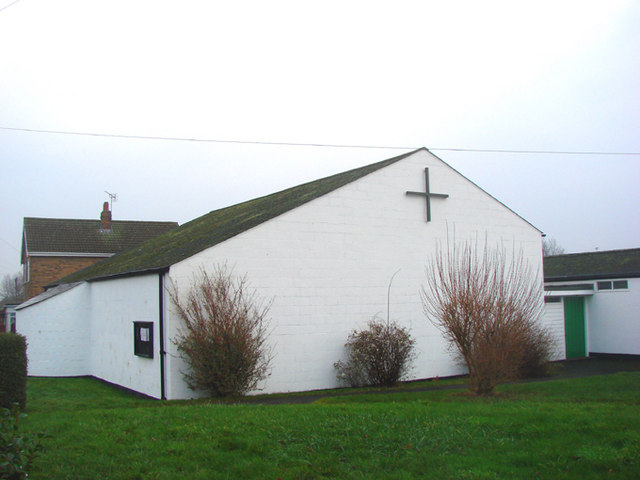
- St Luke's Church

- Location within the City of Doncaster Location within South Yorkshire
- OS grid reference: SE5505
  - London: 145 mi (233 km) SSE
- Metropolitan borough: Doncaster
- Metropolitan county: South Yorkshire
- Region: Yorkshire and the Humber
- Country: England
- Sovereign state: United Kingdom
- Post town: Doncaster
- Postcode district: DN5
- Dialling code: 01302
- Police: South Yorkshire
- Fire: South Yorkshire
- Ambulance: Yorkshire
- UK Parliament: Doncaster North

Scawthorpe is a suburb of Doncaster in South Yorkshire, England on the A638 road. It is split between the city council wards of Roman Ridge and Bentley.

== History ==
Historically in the West Riding of Yorkshire, it was in the civil parish of Bentley with Arksey. Scawthorpe expanded in the early 20th century following the opening of Bentley Colliery, when affordable houses were built by the National Coal Board. Development has slowed since the 1970s, however recent residential developments include The Sycamores, Kingdom Close and Mayfields in the north-west, and Scotsman Drive in the south.

== Geography ==
Scawthorpe is situated primarily to the east of the A638 road, straddling it in its northern extremity where it meets the B6422 to Little Canada. Scawthorpe is surrounded by, clockwise from the north, the suburbs of Bentley, Cusworth, Scawsby, Sunnyfields and Highfields. A short distance to the north in the area of Castle Hills lie the former sites of Hangthwaite Castle and Radcliffe Moat.

Don Valley Academy on Jossey Lane is the local secondary school, with a catchment area incorporating Scawthorpe, Bentley, Arksey, Toll Bar and surrounding areas. Sunnyfields and Castle Hills Primary Schools cover the southern and northern halves of Scawthorpe respectively. There is a pedestrianised shopping precinct on Crossland Way.
