= Houfton =

Houfton may refer to:

- John Plowright Houfton (1857–1929), British colliery owner and politician from Mansfield in Nottinghamshire
- Percy Bond Houfton (died 1926), British architect
