= Highfields Lake =

Lake in South Yorkshire, England

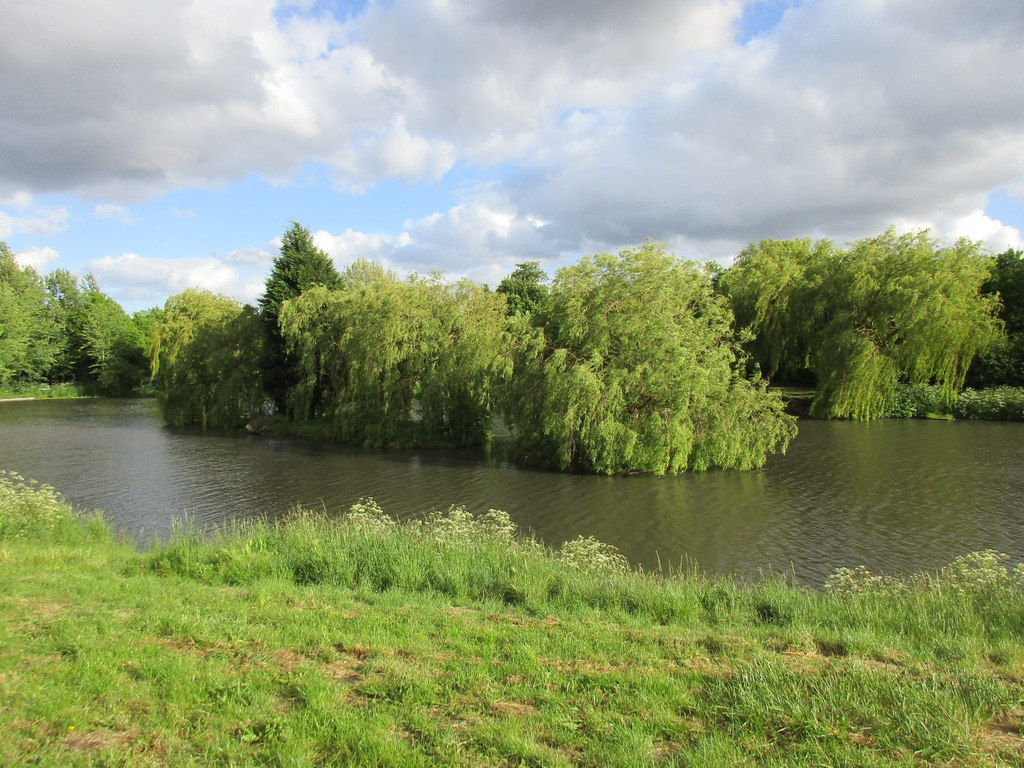
- Islands in Highfield Lake

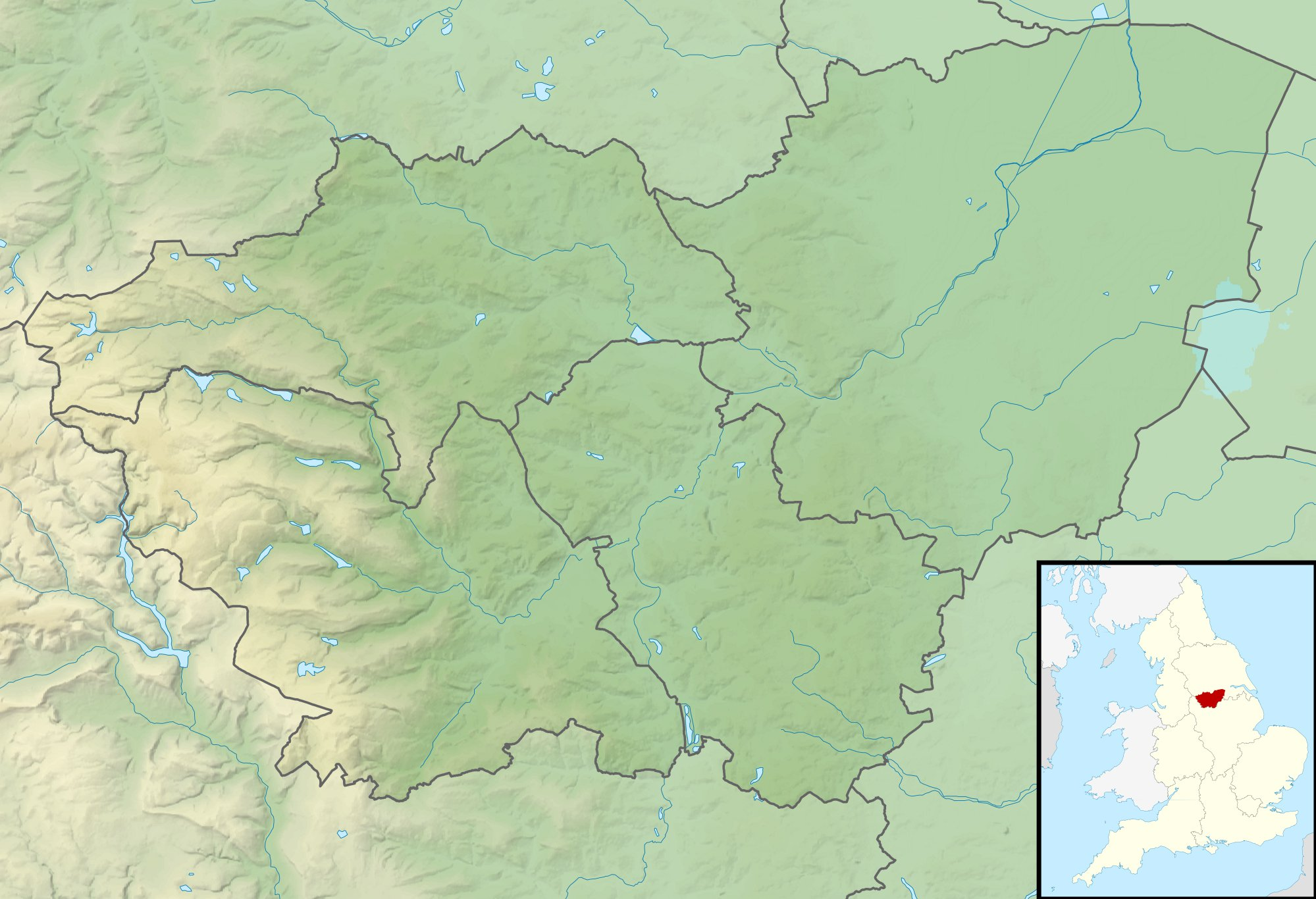
- Location within South Yorkshire
- Location: South Yorkshire, England
- Coordinates: 53°33′27″N 1°11′4″W
- Basin countries: United Kingdom

Highfields Lake is an ornamental lake in the Woodlands wildlife park at Highfields, north of Doncaster, South Yorkshire, England.

It is filled by the Pick Burn, which then flows on to join the River Don as Bentley Mill Stream. The lake was originally built by the owners of Woodlands, a country house that lent its name to the model village built for the miners of Brodsworth Colliery.

The lake now forms part of High Country Park and Woodlands wildlife park, run by Doncaster Metropolitan Borough Council, whilst Woodlands is now a social club. Doncaster Greenway North passes to the north of the lake alongside the A638 road.
