= Roxby, Lincolnshire =

Village in North Lincolnshire, England

Coordinates: 53.640645°N 0.612205°W

Roxby
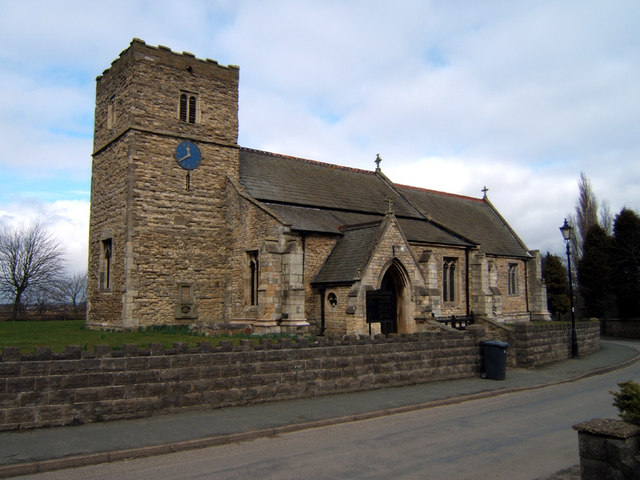
- St Mary's Church, Roxby

- Location within Lincolnshire
- OS grid reference: SE918169
  - London: 150 mi (240 km) S
- Civil parish: Roxby cum Risby
- Unitary authority: North Lincolnshire
- Ceremonial county: Lincolnshire
- Region: Yorkshire and the Humber
- Country: England
- Sovereign state: United Kingdom
- Post town: Scunthorpe
- Postcode district: DN15
- Dialling code: 01724
- Police: Humberside
- Fire: Humberside
- Ambulance: East Midlands
- UK Parliament: Brigg and Immingham

Roxby is a village in North Lincolnshire, England. It is situated approximately 4 miles (6 km) north from Scunthorpe and 1 mile (1.6 km) south-east from Winterton on the A1077. Roxby stands on a prominent part of the Lincoln Cliff and overlooks the Humber Estuary.

Roxby has fewer than 500 inhabitants, and forms part of the civil parish of Roxby cum Risby (where population details are included), which also includes the hamlet of Dragonby.

Roxby Grade I listed Anglican church is dedicated to St Mary. The church, of 12th-century origin with 14th-century additions, is of Decorated style, and was restored and partly rebuilt in 1875 by James Fowler.

In 1719 a Roman mosaic was discovered near to the church. Several attempts to excavate the mosaic were made but it was not until 1972 when it was accurately excavated and recorded by the curator of Scunthorpe Museum. Later excavations by the Humberside Archaeology Unit concluded that the mosaic was part of an aisled structure with the mosaic forming the flooring for a suite of rooms at one end of the villa which may have been up to 22 yards (20 m) wide and 55 yards (50 m) long.

Although no railway line runs directly to Roxby, a major landfill site is situated a few miles away in a disused ironstone quarry. This is served by the remnants of the North Lindsey Light Railway over which trainloads of household rubbish were transported in containers from various locations in the Greater Manchester area.
