= Adwick le Street & Carcroft (ward) =

Electoral ward in Doncaster, England

Coordinates: 53.5716°N 1.1849°W

- Ward
- Location within South Yorkshire
- Area: 12.97 km^{2} (5.01 sq mi)
- Population: 16,894 (2011)
  - Density: 1,303/km^{2} (3,370/sq mi)
- Metropolitan borough: Doncaster
- Metropolitan county: South Yorkshire
- Region: Yorkshire and the Humber
- Country: England
- Sovereign state: United Kingdom
- UK Parliament: Doncaster North
- Councillors: Sarah Smith (Labour); Debbie Hutchinson (Labour); John Mounsey (Labour)

Adwick le Street and Carcroft—consisting of Adwick le Street, Carcroft, Highfields, Skellow and Woodlands—is one of 21 electoral wards in the Metropolitan Borough of Doncaster, South Yorkshire, England. It forms part of the Doncaster North parliamentary constituency. The ward is a stronghold for the Labour Party. In 2011 it had a population of 16,894. The ward was formed in 2015.
