= Holme, North Lincolnshire =

Linear settlement and former civil parish in Lincolnshire, England

Coordinates: 53.550446°N 0.607740°W

Holme
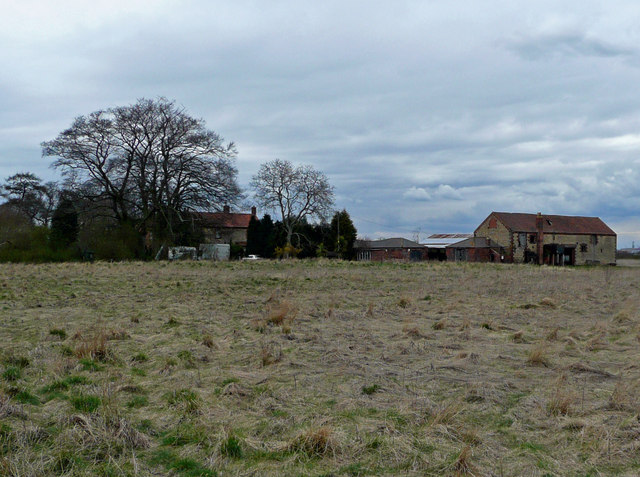
- Twigmoor Hall

- Location within Lincolnshire
- Population: 113 (2011)
- OS grid reference: SE923068
  - London: 140 mi (230 km) S
- Civil parish: Messingham
- Unitary authority: North Lincolnshire
- Ceremonial county: Lincolnshire
- Region: Yorkshire and the Humber
- Country: England
- Sovereign state: United Kingdom
- Post town: Scunthorpe
- Postcode district: DN16
- Police: Humberside
- Fire: Humberside
- Ambulance: East Midlands
- UK Parliament: Scunthorpe

Holme is a linear settlement and former civil parish, now in the parish of Messingham, in the North Lincolnshire district, in the ceremonial county of Lincolnshire, England. The population of the civil parish at the 2011 census was 113.

Holme is situated approximately 5 miles (8 km) south-east from the town of Scunthorpe. Just to the south-east is Grade II listed Twigmoor Hall. This house was the home of John Wright before he was executed for his part in the Gunpowder Plot. The authorities described Twigmoor Hall as ".. one of the worst in her Majesty’s dominions and is used like a Popish college for traitors in the northern parts".

== History ==
=== January 1957 air incident ===
de Havilland Vampire Mk5 'VZ274' crashed on 24 January 1957, flying from RAF Swinderby. The aircraft exploded in mid-air, but the parachute never opened. The pilot was 20 year old Pilot Officer David Alan Bowers, of 11 Upper Melton Terrace of Melton, Suffolk.

== Governance ==
Holme was formerly a township in the parish of Bottesford, in 1866 Holme became a civil parish, on 1 April 2018 the parish was abolished and merged with Messingham.
