= New Edlington =

Area of Edlington, South Yorkshire, England

Coordinates: 53.4806°N 1.1897°W

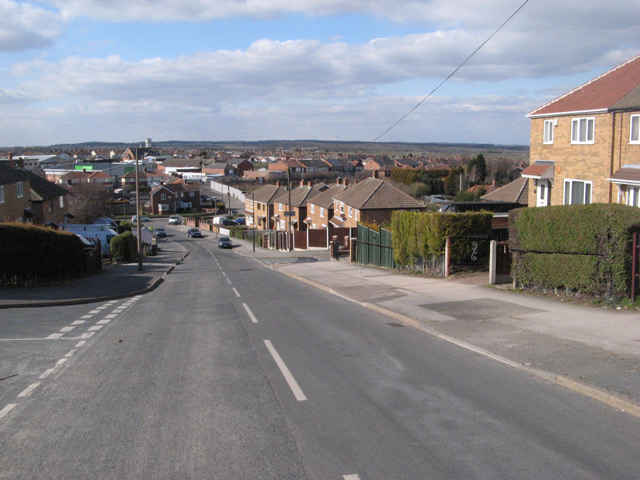
- View of New Edlington along Bernard Road (2013)

- Location within South Yorkshire
- Population: 8,276 (2001)
- OS grid reference: SK5397
- Civil parish: Edlington
- Metropolitan borough: Doncaster
- Metropolitan county: South Yorkshire
- Region: Yorkshire and the Humber
- Country: England
- Sovereign state: United Kingdom
- Post town: DONCASTER
- Postcode district: DN12
- Dialling code: 01709
- Police: South Yorkshire
- Fire: South Yorkshire
- Ambulance: Yorkshire
- UK Parliament: Rawmarsh and Conisbrough

New Edlington is an area of the town of Edlington, Metropolitan Borough of Doncaster, South Yorkshire, England, lying close to Warmsworth and the A630 road.

== Churches and places of worship ==
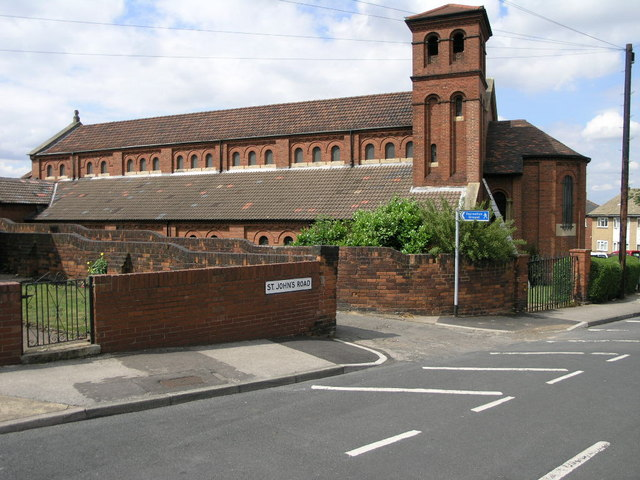
St John the Baptist's church, St John's Road

Warmsworth and New Edlington Church lies on the border of Edlington and Warmsworth. It is located on Edlington Lane near Warmsworth Halt, an area of Warmsworth village.

St John the Baptist's Church is situated on St John's Lane in the western part of New Edlington.

== History ==
The name Edlington derives from the Old English Edlaingtūn meaning 'settlement connected with Edla'.

=== Mining ===
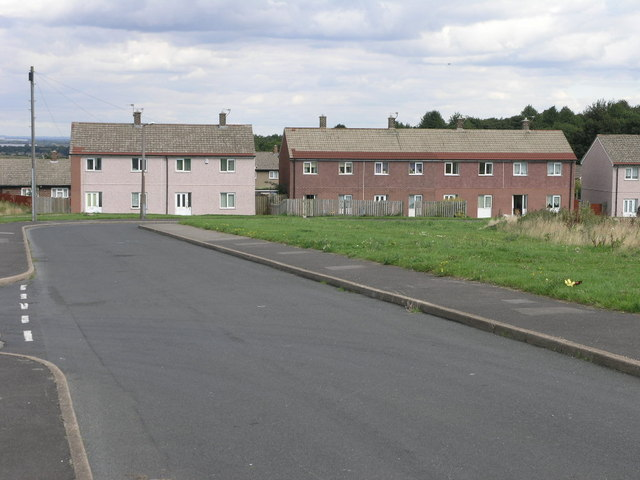
Miners' houses

There is a pit-plain round the back of New Edlingon and Warmsworth, near Martinwells Lake. Both New and Old Edlington are pit-villages.
