= Modern Photography =

20th-century American photo magazine

- Cover, Modern Photography, November 1953 issue
- Editor-in-Chief: Patricia Caulfield
- Frequency: Monthly
- Publisher: Barry Tanenbaum; Jason Schneider; Herbert Keppler
- Total circulation (1989): 689,000
- Founded: 1949
- Final issue: July 1989
- Company: ABC Consumer Magazines
- Country: United States
- Based in: New York City
- Language: English
- Website: www.popphoto.com
- ISSN: 0026-8240

Modern Photography was a popular American photo magazine published and internationally distributed for 52 years from New York City. An unrelated Modern Photography magazine was published in Taiwan from 1976.

== History ==
=== Minicam ===
The original magazine, Minicam, "The Miniature Camera Monthly," was launched September 1937 (Volume 1, No. 1) by the Cleveland publisher, Automobile Digest Publishing Company. By September 1940, the magazine was called Minicam Photography, then, in 1949, Modern Photography. Minicam was devoted to what was then considered the amateur 35mm "miniature" camera format. It was produced in Cincinnati and appeared only a few months after the launch in 1937 of Popular Photography. Thenceforth, the two publications remained fiercely competitive rivals, though the latter was to achieve about twice Minicam's 110,000 circulation.

Minicam was first edited by George R. Hoxie (1907–1984), art photographer and portraitist of Basil Rathbone, Bennet Cerf, Robert Frost, Salvador Dali, and Maurice Tabard, who was active in the Photographic Society of America as both a judge and entrant in salon photography competitions. He became associate editor of the magazine in December 1943 and editor in July 1946, and remained in that position until November 1948.

=== Modern Photography ===
Printed in a small 16.5 cm × 24.1 cm (6 1/2 in × 9 1/2 in) format Minicam proved unattractive to advertisers and when purchased and renamed in 1949 by Photographic Publishing Company in New York, from September that year its dimensions were increased.

In 1963, the magazine was purchased by Billboard Publications then sold again to ABC Leisure Magazines (which became ABC Consumer Magazines).

== Editors ==
Other Editors-in-chief included Herbert (Burt) Keppler (associate editor from 1950) who in 1956 became executive editor of the magazine, then editor and publisher in 1963, and editorial director and publisher in 1966.

Patricia Caulfield worked alongside, and then succeeded Keppler. Her interest in photography was sparked at the age of 20 while studying at the University of Rochester and working during 1953 at Eastman House in an educational program which sponsored a television show in which Beaumont Newhall taught her photography. After graduation, she attended art school at night and worked in a camera store, then at other jobs in New York before becoming a secretary at Modern Photography. She advanced over ten years to editorial assistant, then assistant editor, picture editor, managing editor and into her final position of executive editor. She contributed technical writing and advice to amateurs. Caulfield, inspired by Eliot Porter, went on to become an environmentalist, prominent nature photographer, and advocate for preservation of the Everglades.

== Contents ==
Modern Photography featured regular columns including "Hard Knocks" that reviewed reader pictures, and "Camera Collector", and advertised photographic equipment and materials, with a back-pages classifieds section devoted to mail-order offerings.

Keppler wrote technical reviews, editorials, and articles on the full range of topics relating to film, cameras, and photography. He remained for 37 years at Modern Photography a photographer, journalist, consultant, and editorial director (moving on to Popular Photography for a further 20 years). He wrote a monthly "Keppler's SLR Notebook".

The magazine changed how the industry tested and reviewed cameras and lenses. Keppler developed objective tests in a lab environment over 20 years that were repeatable between many different models to give measurable proof of a certain model's performance, and lens tests for which he had photographed a grouping of high-contrast United States Air Force resolution targets to determine lens definition at centers and corners of the negative. Keppler championed the quality and engineering of the Japanese camera at a time after the war when anti-Japanese bias still prevailed. The magazine hired consultants from the Japanese Camera Inspection Institute to ensure the rigour of their "Modern Tests" feature, since each camera successfully tested was guaranteed with a "Seal of Approval" that it would perform as tested or be replaced or repaired.

== Influence ==
The audience for Modern Photography spanned amateurs who wanted to learn how to improve their picture-taking, and professionals who wanted to keep apace of new developments in photo technology and to access reliable testing of it. It published an annual that displayed folios of significant new photography from the fields of photojournalism, commercial, fashion and art photography. It issued spin-off publications including Photo Buying Guide, Photo Information Almanac, and How To Photograph Nudes.

The June 1964 issue of Modern Photography included a folded insert of a color photograph of seven hibiscus blossoms taken by the editor-in-chief, Patricia Caulfield to illustrate an article about a Kodak color processor. Andy Warhol's Flowers was based on her image, cropped square and with the number and arrangement of the blossoms edited in variations, differing from one another in color and size, produced using the screen-printing process in some case with blossoms and background painted by hand in Day-Glo colors, and presented in exhibitions covering entire gallery walls as though they were wallpaper. Caulfield had not given Warhol her permission and brought a legal action against him. Though Warhol offered Caulfield two sets of Flowers by way of payment she declined, preferring a cash payout. The incident is credited with Warhol's taking up the camera himself for later screen print productions.

== Cessation of title and merger ==
After Capital Cities-ABC sold the magazine to Diamandis Communications, the new owner announced that publication would cease as of the v. 53, no. 7, July issue of 1989, at which time its subscriber list was taken over by its larger rival, Popular Photography, also owned by Diamandis, who reported a final circulation figure of 689,000 for Modern Photography. Photo historian Bob Lazaroff gives a subscriber number of 500,000 at merger.
