= Raymond Hide =

British physicist (1929–2016)

- CBE FRS
- Born: 17 May 1929
- Died: 6 September 2016 (aged 87)
- Citizenship: British
- Education: DSc (1969)
- Alma mater: University of Manchester (1947-1950) and University of Cambridge (1950-1953)
- Scientific career
- Fields: Physics
- Workplaces: Jesus College, Oxford, Imperial College, London
- Thesis: Some Experiments on Thermal Convection in a Rotating Liquid (1953)
- Doctoral advisor: Keith Runcorn

Raymond Hide CBE FRS (17 May 1929 – 6 September 2016) was a British physicist, who was a professor of physics at the University of Oxford and, since 2000, senior research investigator at Imperial College, London.

== Education ==
Hide was educated at Percy Jackson Grammar School, near Doncaster, South Yorkshire and the University of Manchester, where he obtained a first-class degree in physics in 1950. He then went to Gonville and Caius College, Cambridge and studied for a PhD in the Geophysics Department, he was awarded a doctorate in 1953.

== Career ==
After research at the University of Chicago, he was a senior research fellow at the Atomic Energy Research Establishment at Harwell, Oxfordshire from 1954 to 1957. He was a lecturer in physics at King's College, Newcastle from 1957 to 1961, before becoming professor of geophysics and physics at the Massachusetts Institute of Technology (1961 to 1967). He was then head of the Geophysical Fluid Dynamics Lab at the Met Office (1967 to 1990). He won the Chree medal and prize in 1975. He was appointed a fellow of Jesus College, Oxford in 1983, holding his fellowship until 1996; he was then appointed an honorary fellow in 1997. Between 1984 and 1990, he was the professor of astronomy at Gresham College, based central London. He was director of the Robert Hooke Institute and a visiting professor in the Department of Physics at the University of Oxford from 1990 to 1992.

His research covered geophysics (geomagnetism, meteorology, geodesy, oceanography), planetary physics, geophysical fluid mechanics, including magnetohydrodynamics (MHD), and nonlinear systems. His work on the hydrodynamics and MHD of spinning fluids defined flow phenomena in atmospheres and oceans and the interiors of planetary bodies.

Hide was elected a fellow of the American Academy of Arts and Sciences in 1964 and a fellow of the Royal Society in 1971. He was awarded the Fernand Holweck Medal and Prize in 1982, the Gold Medal of the Royal Astronomical Society for geophysics in 1989, the William Bowie Medal by the American Geophysical Union in 1997, the Royal Society's Hughes Medal in 1998, Lewis Fry Richardson Medal by the European Geosciences Union in 1999 and the Royal Meteorological Society's Symons Gold Medal in 2002.

He was appointed CBE in 1990. He served as president of the Royal Meteorological Society from 1974 to 1976 and was a member of the Pontifical Academy of Sciences, having been appointed by Pope John Paul II in 1996.

In 2000 he became senior research investigator, at the Department of Mathematics, Imperial College London. He died on 6 September 2016 at the age of 87.
