= Norman Rothschild =

American photographer, artist and writer (1913-1995)

Norman Rothschild (1913–1995) was an American photographer, artist, and writer.

Rothschild arrived in the United States from Germany at the age of 5 1/2 with his parents. He became a studio and darkroom assistant at the age of 14. For 33 years he was an editor and contributor to Popular Photography magazine, including a monthly column, "Offbeat".

He died at the age of 82 in 1995.

He was known for his creative use of materials to stunning visual effects before the advent of digital cameras and tools such as Photoshop. He frequently used and wrote about his experience with creative photographic accessories such as filters from Spiratone.

Edward Steichen called him "the man who makes rainbows." Burt Keppler, publisher of Popular Photography magazine, called him a "living photographic legend."
