= Sunnyfields =

Coordinates: 53.54127°N 1.17062°W

- Location within South Yorkshire
- OS grid reference: SE5404
  - London: 145 mi (233 km) SSE
- Metropolitan borough: Doncaster
- Metropolitan county: South Yorkshire
- Region: Yorkshire and the Humber
- Country: England
- Sovereign state: United Kingdom
- Post town: Doncaster
- Postcode district: DN5
- Dialling code: 01302
- Police: South Yorkshire
- Fire: South Yorkshire
- Ambulance: Yorkshire
- UK Parliament: Doncaster

Sunnyfields is a suburb of Doncaster, South Yorkshire, England. It lies to the east of Scawsby and to the west of Scawthorpe.

Located less than a mile from the A1(M), the nearest railway stations are Bentley and Doncaster. This puts it in a good location for those commuting to Doncaster, Sheffield, Leeds or beyond.
