= Adwick Town Hall =

Town hall in South Yorkshire, England

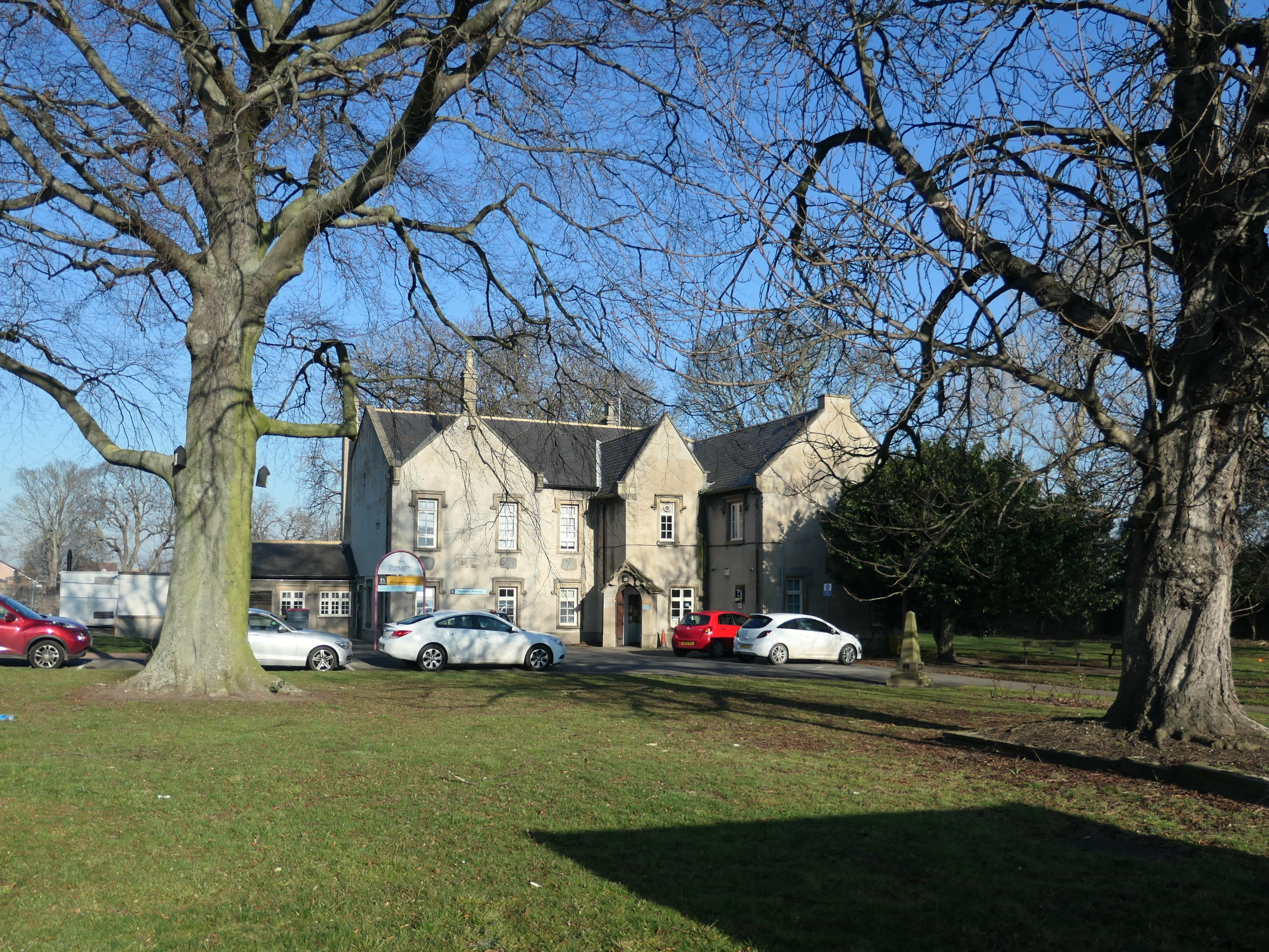
- The building in February 2019

- Shown in South Yorkshire
- 53.5695°N 1.1850°W
- Location: Adwick Park, Adwick le Street

History
- Built: 1682

Site notes
- Architectural style: Domestic style

Adwick Town Hall is a municipal building in Adwick le Street, a town in South Yorkshire, in England. The hall, which currently accommodates St Leger Homes, is included in the local listing for Adwick Park.

== History ==
The building was commissioned by the Rev. Joshua Brook, the vicar of St Laurence's Church, to serve as the rectory for the Church of St Lawrence which dates from the 12th century. The site he selected was in the grounds of Adwick Manor, which was the seat of the Washington family from the 16th century.

The rectory was designed in the domestic style, built in brick with a cement render finish and was completed around 1682. Brook continued to live in the house until the end of the century. He was responsible for sinking a well there and for planting an orchard, before handing the building over to his successor. The building was enlarged when the Rev. Thomas Martin Symonds was the vicar in the mid-19th century. It continued to be used by successive vicars of the parish until a new rectory was built in Village Street in the early 1950s.

Meanwhile, Adwick le Street Urban District Council, which had been formed in 1915, and subsequently established offices in Village Street, was seeking more substantial offices. The council purchased the old rectory to serve as its headquarters in 1952. The building was in poor condition, and the council decided to remove all the old timbers and replace them with concrete beams and floors. After the remedial works had been completed, the building was officially re-opened by Councillor Harry Baynham as Adwick Town Hall on 6 December 1955.

The building continued to serve as the headquarters of the urban district council for another two decades, but ceased to be the local seat of government when the enlarged Doncaster Metropolitan Borough Council was formed in 1974. It was subsequently used by the council for the delivery of local services and currently accommodates its housing division, known as St Leger Homes.

== Architecture ==
The building is laid out as in two blocks joined to form an "L" shape. The main frontage faces west and features three large gables. There is a small porch with a gable, projected forward from the centre of the "L" shape, and the building is fenestrated with casement windows with hood moulds.
