= Roxby cum Risby =

Civil parish in Lincolnshire, England

Coordinates: 53.636855°N 0.602476°W

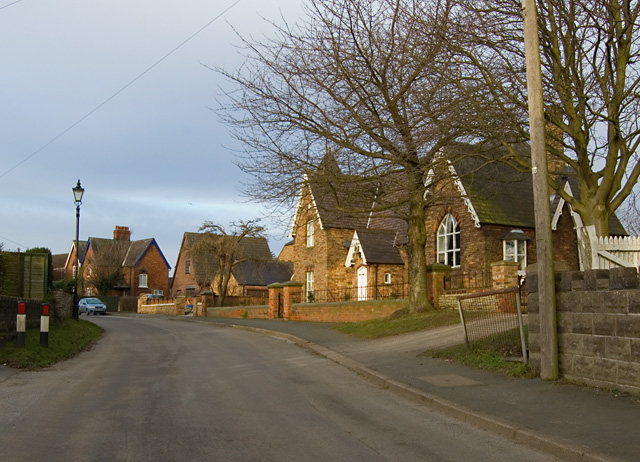
North Street, Roxby

Roxby cum Risby is a civil parish forming part of the district of North Lincolnshire, England. The population of the civil parish at the 2011 census was 479. The main settlement is Roxby. Smaller settlements include Dragonby (grid reference SE904140), High Risby (SE920147) and Low Risby (SE931148). Dragonby was a settlement of the Corieltauvi in the late Pre-Roman Iron Age.

== History ==
The separate hamlets of Roxby and Risby were in existence and are both mentioned in the Domesday Book of 1086. Roxby was under ownership of Gilbert de Gant, whilst Risby was under the ownership of the Abbot of Peterborough. Risby was later annexed by Roxby for the purposes of forming a parish. During the reign of King Henry VIII of England, Risby was taken by the Crown from the Abbot as part of the dissolution of the monasteries, and it was given to Sir William Herbert during the reign of King Edward VI of England.

== Historic buildings ==
In 1799, the mosaic floor of a Roman villa was discovered in the parish. Further excavations started to cause gradual damage before it was mapped in 1972. Further excavation in 1989 revealed a farmhouse attached to the villa.

St Mary's Church in Roxby was constructed in the 12th century and underwent Victorian restoration in 1875. To expand the number of gravesites available, one of the churchwardens in the 1830s ordered several headstones to be laid flat. The headstones were subsequently damaged by children trampling over them. It was granted grade I listed building status in 1967 by English Heritage. Risby also had a church dedicated to St Bartholomew which preceded Roxby's church but this church was closed by the Church of England in 1911.
