= Woodlands, South Yorkshire =

Model village in South Yorkshire, England

Coordinates: 53.5657°N 1.2006°W

Woodlands
- Village
- Model Village

- Location within City of Doncaster Location within South Yorkshire
- Metropolitan borough: Doncaster
- Metropolitan county: South Yorkshire
- Region: Yorkshire and the Humber
- Country: England
- Sovereign state: United Kingdom
- Post town: DONCASTER
- Postcode district: DN6
- Dialling code: 01302
- Police: South Yorkshire
- Fire: South Yorkshire
- Ambulance: Yorkshire
- UK Parliament: Doncaster North

Woodlands is a model village 4 miles (6 km) north-west of Doncaster in South Yorkshire, England. The village lies adjacent to Highfields and Adwick le Street within the City of Doncaster. The colliery village was designed and built in the early 20th century by the architect Percy Houfton as tied cottages for the miners of the neighbouring Brodsworth Colliery. In an era of model villages such as Saltaire, Port Sunlight and Bournville, Woodlands, with extensive open spaces, many different designs of houses, and overall living conditions excellent for their time, possibly represents the height of the model village movement. The village is a conservation area.

It had a population of 7,100 as of 2023, making it the largest settlement which falls under the Adwick le Street & Carcroft ward.

== Topography ==
Lying between the historic Great North Road (the former A1, now the A638) and a Roman Road, the houses in the village are in short terraces, typically of four, and face each other across wide avenues. At the back they typically overlook a large square open space. The Roman Road is Ermine Street, the branch from Lincoln to York via Doncaster and Tadcaster. Locally, it is colloquially known as the Roman Rigg, more correctly as the Roman Ridge.

Between the village and Highfields, the former country house of Woodlands has been adapted as a social club. Nearby is the Woodlands wildlife park, with Highfields Lake (an ornamental lake on the Pick Burn) and Hanging Wood (or Highfields Wood). In Highfields Wood is a stream, known as Robin Hood's stream, which springs near the Roman Rigg, and runs into Pick Burn. The stream may be so named as Robin Hood is reputed to have roamed in Barnsdale Forest, of which Highfields Wood was part.

In "The Park", a green of 24 acres (9.7 ha) is surrounded by about 120 of the workers' houses. The houses back on to woodland or to green open space and, instead of facing each other across a narrow street, look across perhaps 200 yards of parkland to the houses opposite. The nearby country house Brodsworth Hall, built in the 1860s for Charles Augustus Thellusson, was acquired by English Heritage in the late 1980s and is operated as a house museum.

== Community facilities ==
The largest community facility is one built in 1924 for the miners and the community which is the miners welfare which originally stood on 15 acres of land and now provides the sporting and recreational facilities in woodlands The village has five public houses, The Woodlands (locally known as the swinger, now closed and rebuilt as assisted housing), Park Club, The Officials, Rhinos (formally Woodlands Working Mens Club known as the bomb) and The Highwayman (previously The Broad highway). There is one restaurant (Aagrah), three fish and chip shops, two Chinese takeaways, a snooker hall, cafe, post office, fire station, library, four hairdressers, a tanning shop, and one computer shop.

== Education ==
Woodlands schools are Woodlands Infants School, and Woodlands Junior School, which are now known as Woodlands Primary School. There's also Adwick Infant and Adwick Primary school, and St Joseph & St Teresa's school which is an infant and primary catholic school. Outwood Academy Adwick is the only secondary school in the area.

== Religious sites ==
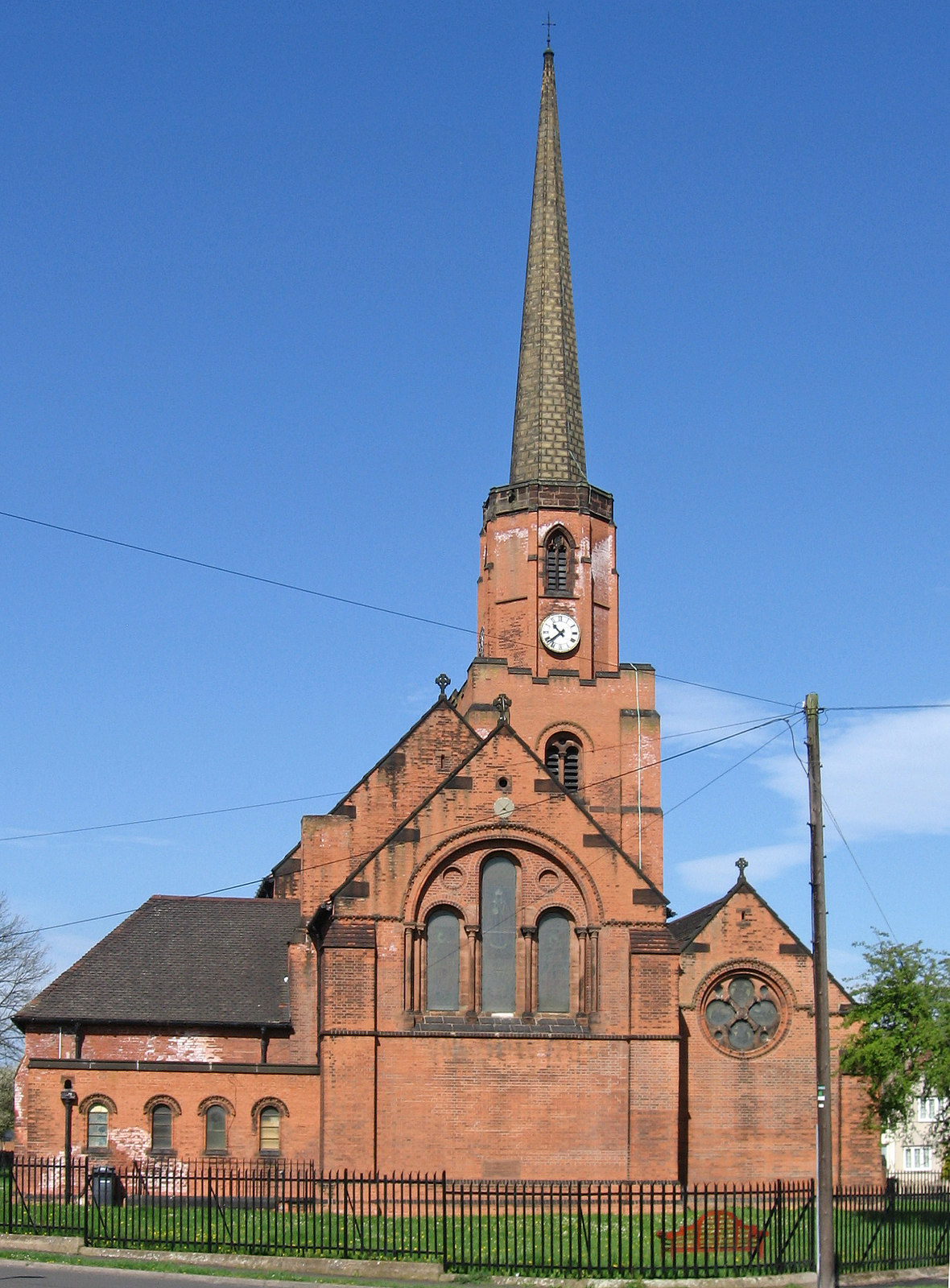
All Saints Church forms a focal point of the colliery village.

There are two churches, Woodlands All Saints' Church and St. Joseph & St. Theresa's Catholic Church (with community hall).

All Saints Church (1913) is a red brick parish church built for this mining community by the Thellusson family, owners of Brodsworth Hall. The church's distinctive spire is visible from central Doncaster, the A1(M), and the main East Coast railway-line. The church is unusual for having a small baptistry positioned behind the font at the back of the church, for baptising adults by immersion. (In practice this baptistry requires candidates to squat or kneel down in it, and there is barely enough space for the priest to be in the tank with the candidate - though that has not prevented it being used for a number of adults and young people in recent years). All Saints was one of a few late Oxford Movement churches to be built with baptistries. All Saints is a Grade II listed building.

== Sport ==
Brodsworth Welfare A.F.C. play at the Welfare Ground in the village; Brodsworth Main Cricket Club and Brodsworth Bowing Club are also within the Welfare Grounds. Bowling Fishing Darts Snooker and Pool all happen at Woodlands Park Sports & Social Club. There is also a gym in the club upstairs called Eco Fitness that does all different outdoor sports.

== Refurbishment ==
The local council, DMBC, is using Green Corridor Money to give the Squares a facelift and to give the houses a back garden. 4 Squares had been completed by October 2009. The Brodsworth Informer, a Bi-Monthly, 16 page news journal, is delivered free to almost 4,000 homes in the area. 2003 saw the revival of the old May Festival, started in 1910 when mine owner Sir Arthur Markham was persuaded to give the miners a day off with pay for the Festival.

The village was featured on Thursday 30 August 2007 (at 6.30pm) on the BBC Look North's A-Z of the region.

== Notable residents ==
- Thomas Howes, actor.
- David Pegg, former Manchester United player.

== See also ==
- Listed buildings in Adwick le Street and Carcroft
