= Basex =

Basex, Inc.
- Type: Privately held
- Industry: Research
- Founded: 1983
- Headquarters: New York City
- Products: Research; Consulting

Basex was an IT research and consulting firm that focused on knowledge management, information management, and collaboration issues and technologies within larger organizations. It was known as The Basex Group until 2001.

== History ==
Basex, which was founded in 1983 as The Basex Group, first started by advising companies on how to understand and leverage the newly deregulated telecommunications environment that came about as a result of the Bell System divestiture. The divestiture allowed telecommunications companies expand to new fields and to develop and offer more deregulated services which in turn supported the Information Age and the Knowledge Economy. Since only the largest companies had, up until that point, had undergone computerization, smaller companies needed advisory services and guidance as they entered this new era, a role that Basex and other companies would undertake.

== Research ==
Basex provided market research, competitive intelligence, and management consulting to various companies. The company wrote a great deal about information overload as being a problem for businesses and indicates it focused on the problem in its research.

Basex primarily focused on how companies and knowledge workers use knowledge management and collaboration technologies and techniques.

Basex said it began concentrating on information overload in the early 1990s. Basex has undertaken various research studies on the subject and maintains that the problem costs the U.S. economy about $900 billion annually.

== Criticism ==
Two articles in The Wall Street Journal (in 2008) and Slate (in 2006) questioned certain aspects of Basex's findings on interruptions although both writers acknowledged that the problem of information overload that Basex was calling attention to was important. Since those two articles appeared, The Wall Street Journal and multiple other publications, including The New York Times, Financial Times, Die Presse, and Business Week, along with numerous more specialized publications, have used Basex's research on information overload as the foundation for a story on information overload.
