= Percy Houfton =

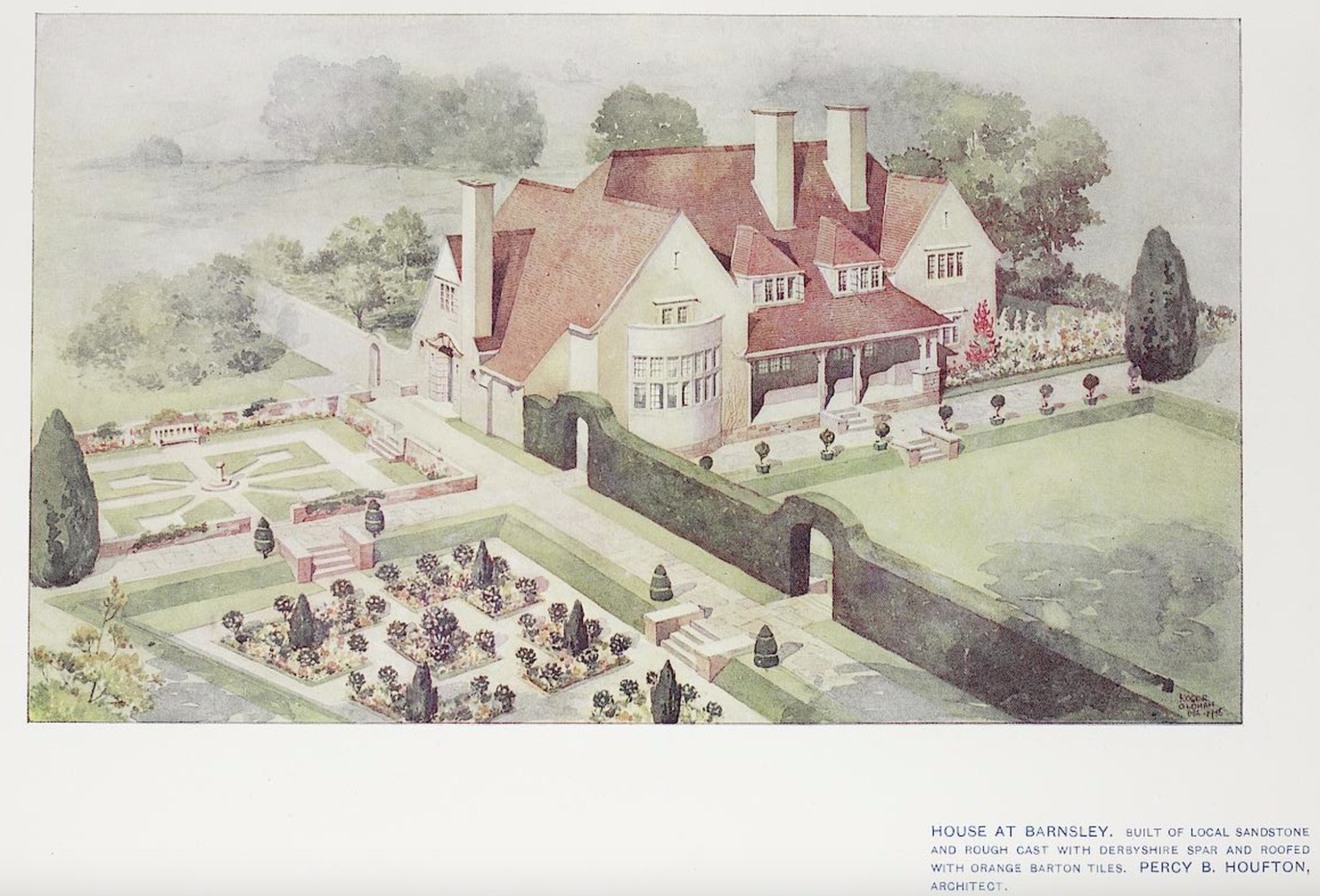
House at Barnsley from Studio Yearbook 1907

Woodlands Model Village ca. 1908

Percy Bond Houfton (1873–1926) was a late-19th century and early-20th century English architect.

== Career ==
He started work for his older cousin, J. P. Houfton at the Bolsover and Creswell Colliery Company. He was awarded a certificate in mine management in 1897 and was elected to the Institute of Mining Engineers.

After designing Creswell Model Village for the colliery company in 1895, he turned to architecture and opened his own practice in Chesterfield in 1898. Much of his work was for colliery companies and designing private houses. In 1905 he was awarded a prize of £100 for producing the best cottage at Letchworth Garden City. Between 1907 and 1909 Sir Arthur Markham of Brodsworth Colliery employed him to build Woodlands, a model village for employees at his colliery near Doncaster. Houfton applied garden village principles designing the houses in an Arts and Crafts style with large gables reminiscent of the style of Voysey.

He became a Fellow of the Royal Institute of British Architects in 1925.

He had obituaries in

- The Builder 130:826 21 May 1926
- RIBA Journal 33:495 26 June 1926

== Personal life ==
He was born in 1873 in Alfreton, Derbyshire, the son of Elijah Houfton (1832-1908) and Elizabeth Bond (1842-1937). Elijah Houfton was surveyor for Alfreton Urban Council. Percy was educated at St Mary's House School in Chesterfield.

He married Elizabeth Robinson (1879 - 1964), eldest daughter of William Robinson of Chesterfield on 2 July 1902 at St Thomas' Church, Brampton, Chesterfield, Derbyshire. A daughter, Margaret Eileen Houfton was born in 1904.

He died on 16 May 1926 and left an estate valued at £8,566 18s 10d. (equivalent to £452,700 in 2025).

== Works ==
- Cottage, 217 Iknield Way, Letchworth 1905 Grade II listed
- Workmans' Institute, Public Hall and Girls' Club, Brook Street, Sutton-in-Ashfield 1906
- Terry Holt Cottage, 100A The Park, Woodlands, Doncaster 1907-08 Grade II listed
- Semi-detached houses, 5 and 6, The Park, Woodlands, Doncaster 1907-08 Grade II listed
- Four houses, 7-10, The Park, Woodlands, Doncaster 1907-08 Grade II listed
- Four houses, 2-8 Central Avenue, Woodlands, Doncaster 1908 Grade II listed
- Semi-detached houses, 27 and 29 Central Avenue, Woodlands, Doncaster 1908 Grade II listed
- Four houses, 31-37 Central Avenue, Woodlands, Doncaster 1908 Grade II listed
- Semi-detached houses, 15 and 17 Green Lane, Woodlands, Doncaster 1908 Grade II listed
- Four houses, 26-32 Green Lane, Woodlands, Doncaster 1908 Grade II listed
- Semi-detached houses, 27 and 29 Green Lane, Woodlands, Doncaster 1908 Grade II listed
- Semi-detached houses, 87 and 89, Great North Road, Woodlands, Doncaster 1908 Grade II listed
- Three houses, 1-7 Harold Avenue, Woodlands, Doncaster 1908 Grade II listed
- Semi-detached houses, 33 and 35 The Crescent, Woodlands, Doncaster 1908 Grade II listed
- Semi-detached houses, 45 and 47 The Crescent, Woodlands, Doncaster 1908 Grade II listed
- Three houses, 49-53 The Crescent, Woodlands, Doncaster 1908 Grade II listed
- Semi-detached houses, 64 and 66 The Crescent, Woodlands, Doncaster 1908 Grade II listed
- Semi-detached houses, 65 and 67 The Crescent, Woodlands, Doncaster 1908 Grade II listed
- Semi-detached houses, 73 and 675 The Crescent, Woodlands, Doncaster 1908 Grade II listed
- Semi-detached houses, 113 and 115 The Crescent, Woodlands, Doncaster 1908 Grade II listed
- Four houses, 129-135 The Crescent, Woodlands, Doncaster 1908 Grade II listed
- Three houses, 17-19 Quarry Lane, Woodlands, Doncaster 1908 Grade II listed
- Semi-detached houses, 23 and 25 West Avenue, Woodlands, Doncaster 1908 Grade II listed
- Woodside Cottages, 1 and 2, Woodlands, Doncaster 1908 Grade II listed
- Sheffield and Hallamshire Bank, Gluman Gate/Market Place, Chesterfield 1911-13
- Chesterfield Technical College, Infirmary Road, Chesterfield, Derbyshire 1924-27
- Derbyshire Miners' Convalescent Home, Skegness 1928
