= Pickburn =

Hamlet in South Yorkshire, England

Coordinates: 53°33′40″N 1°13′19″W

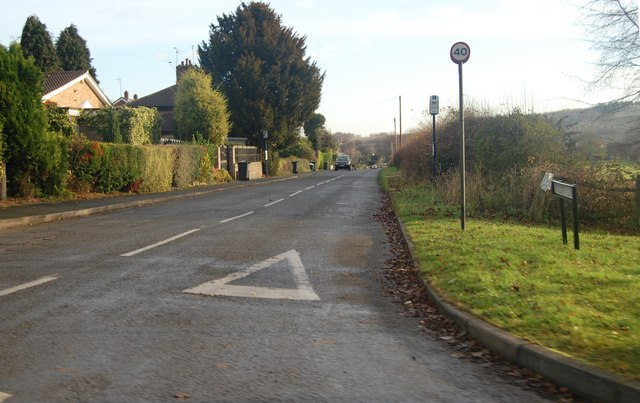
Pickburn Lane

Pickburn is a hamlet in South Yorkshire, England, close to the village of Brodsworth and Brodsworth Hall.

== History ==
The hamlet appears to get its name from the small stream "Pick Burn" (or river Pick) which flows through it on its way to Highfields Lake, in the Woodlands wildlife park. At the time of Kirkby's Inquest, Pickburn was held by the Wasteneys and the Lyvets. The Lyvets (Levett), who gave their name to the nearby hamlet of Hooton Levitt, later held Roche Abbey by inheritance from the FitzTurgis (later de Wickersley) family.

There was a railway station a few yards south of the hamlet named 'Pickburn and Brodsworth', which was on a branch of the Hull, Barnsley & West Riding Junction Railway, the last substantial completely new railway built in Britain. The halt was opened on 1 December 1894 and, although it was closed to passengers in February 1903, remained open for freight until 30 September 1963. No evidence now remains of the station's existence.
