= Herbert Keppler =

American photographer and author (1925-2008)

- Born: Herbert Keppler; April 21, 1925; New York City, USA
- Died: January 4, 2008 (aged 82); Croton-on-Hudson, New York, USA
- Known for: Photography, journalism, writing

Herbert "Burt" Keppler (April 21, 1925 – January 4, 2008) was an American photographer, journalist, author and consultant. His career spanned 57 years, including 37 at Modern Photography and two decades at Popular Photography. He wrote monthly columns and served in the former magazine as Editorial Director and Publisher, and in the latter magazine as Vice President and Publishing Director.

== Life and career ==
Herbert Keppler was born in New York on April 21, 1925, to commercial photographer and illustrator Victor Keppler. He started in photography at the age of six and processed his own color photographs at the age of ten. He earned a Bachelor of Arts degree at Harvard University and was commissioned as an ensign in the U.S. Navy near the end of World War II.

After the war, Herbert Keppler was a photojournalist for The Sun (New York) and worked for the Fairchild Fashion Media trade magazine Footwear News, but found his calling, when he in 1950 became an Associate Editor at the photographic magazine Modern Photography. In 1956 he became Executive Editor of the magazine, then Editor and Publisher in 1963 and Editorial Director and Publisher in 1966. He changed the way photographic magazines tested equipment from an, at the time prevalent, subjective analysis to a more objective analysis by introducing a testing lab that could perform scientific tests on cameras, lenses and other photographic equipment—e.g. resolution tests for lenses. He also established a code of ethics for advertisers and would decline advertisers access to the magazine if they were found to use unethical methods in their sales and advertising.

In 1987, Herbert Keppler joined Popular Photography and was vice president and senior counselor of this magazine at the time of his death. He died on January 4, 2008, in Croton-on-Hudson and is survived by his wife Louise, son Thomas and daughter Kathryn.

=== Industry consultant ===
In addition to his work as journalist and author, Keppler was striving for the further technical improvement of photographic cameras and equipment. He regularly traveled to Japan and worked as a consultant for Japan's photo industry.

=== Honors and awards ===
Keppler was included in the Photo Marketing Hall of Fame in 1985, and honored for his lifetime achievement by the Photographic Manufacturers and Distributors Association in 1991. In 2002 he also received, and one of the few foreign recipients of, the Japanese Order of the Sacred Treasure (4th class, Gold Rays with Rosette) from the Emperor of Japan for his contribution to the Japanese photographic industry.

== Selected publications ==
Keppler authored several books. Among them are the following:

- "Keppler on the Eye Level Reflex" (1960)
- "The Honeywell Pentax Way: The Pentax Photographer's Companion" (1966)
- "The Asahi Pentax Way: The Asahi Pentax Photographer's Companion" (1975)
- "The Nikon & Nikkormat Way" (1978)
- "The Nikon Way" (1983)

== See also ==
- iISO hot shoe
