= Messingham =

Village and civil parish in North Lincolnshire, England

Coordinates: 53.52727°N 0.65346°W

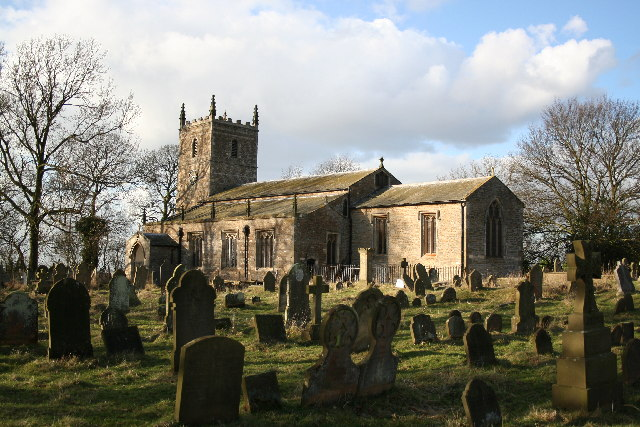
- Holy Trinity Church, Messingham

- Location within Lincolnshire
- Population: 4,029 (2011 census)
- OS grid reference: SE893042
  - London: 140 mi (230 km) S
- Unitary authority: North Lincolnshire
- Ceremonial county: Lincolnshire
- Region: Yorkshire and the Humber
- Country: England
- Sovereign state: United Kingdom
- Post town: SCUNTHORPE
- Postcode district: DN17
- Dialling code: 01724
- Police: Humberside
- Fire: Humberside
- Ambulance: East Midlands
- UK Parliament: Scunthorpe

Messingham is a village and civil parish in North Lincolnshire, England.

The village is situated on the A159, 4 miles (6 km) south of the centre of Scunthorpe and 1 mile (1.6 km) south of the M180. West Lindsey is 1 mile to the south, as is Scotter.

Messingham has a population of over 4,000 people.

== Community ==
Schools serving the village are Messingham Primary School, Frederick Gough School, Queen Elizabeth's High School, Huntcliff and John Leggott College. The parish church is dedicated to the Holy Trinity. There is also a Methodist church. (John Wesley preached in Messingham on 24 July 1772, possibly at the site the Green Tree public house.) Village public houses are the Horn Inn, Green Tree Inn and Crown Inn on High Street, and the Bird in the Barley on Northfield Road (A159).

Scunthorpe's 'British Steel' steel works is a major employer of local people.

On the outskirts of Messingham is Grange Park Golf Club, Messingham Zoo and nearby on the B1400 road, a nature reserve. The Sand Quarry is a Site of Special Scientific Interest.

== Sport ==
Messingham has various sports clubs. Football, Cricket and Bowls clubs are based at the Northfield Road site.
