= Hangthwaite Castle =

Former castle in South Yorkshire, England

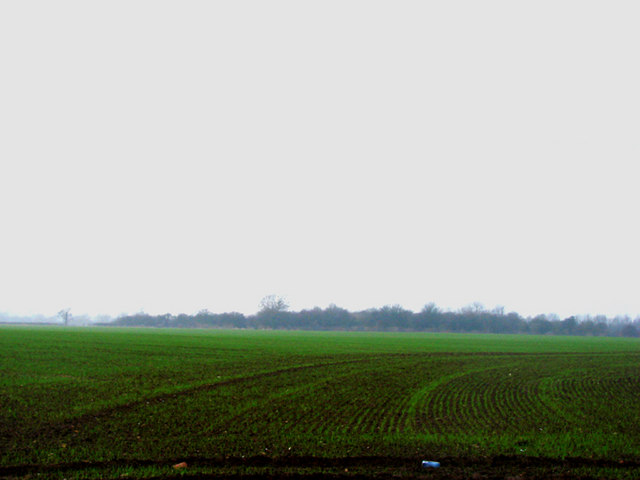
View towards the remains of the castle

Hangthwaite Castle was an earthwork motte and bailey castle founded by Nigel Fozzard. It stood in the 11th century and is situated just north of Scawthorpe, Doncaster, South Yorkshire, England. Originally, the site was known as Langthwaite, though it changed over the years to Hangthwaite. In the 13th century, a fortified house called Radcliffe Moat (53.5554°N 1.1639°W) replaced Hangthwaite Castle as a local fortification. Nowadays, only the motte and the ditches remain. Encased by the wide wet ditch, the motte defends a bean-shaped eastern bailey and a small north-western mound, which is possibly a barbican.

A settlement was adjacent to the castle, which is now designated as a Deserted Medieval Village (DMV). The site is now a scheduled monument.

It is known locally as Castle Hills, with a school, just a few hundred yards away bearing the name Castle Hills Primary School.
