= Popular Photography =

Former American consumer magazine

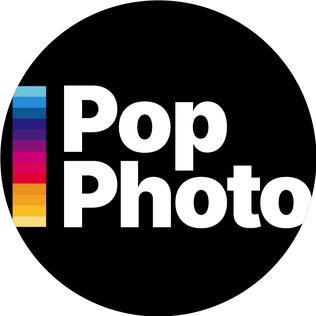

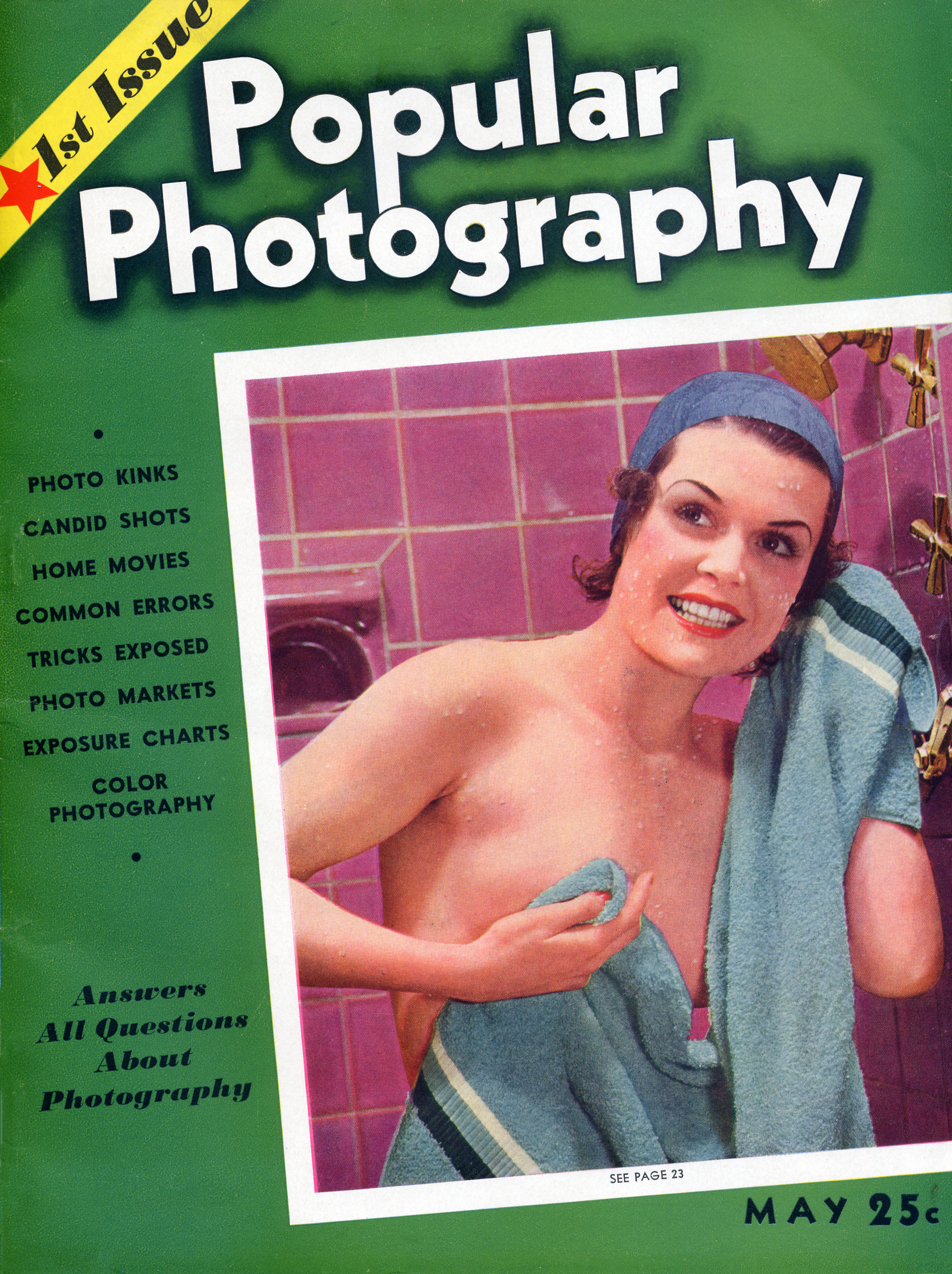
- First issue, May 1937
- General Manager: Adam Morath
- Categories: Photography
- Frequency: Fully digital
- Total circulation: 359,818 (December 2012)
- Founded: 1937
- Final issue: 2017
- Company: Recurrent Ventures
- Country: United States
- Based in: New York City
- Language: English
- Website: www.popphoto.com
- ISSN: 1542-0337

Popular Photography, briefly known as Popular Photography & Imaging, and also called Pop Photo, was a monthly American consumer website and magazine. Beginning publication in 1937, the magazine and website ceased publication in early 2017. The website relaunched in December 2021, before finally shutting down operations for a second time in November 2023.

Popular Photography also published a yearly Photography Annual, which was published from the 1950s to the early 2000s.

One of its most well-known editors was American photographer and writer Norman Rothschild, whom Edward Steichen once called "the man who makes rainbows."

== History ==
Popular Photography was established in May 1937 by Ziff-Davis Publishing Company. Bernard George Davis, a photography enthusiast, was the original editor.

Ziff sold off most of its magazines in 1984. Its consumer group, which included Popular Photography, was acquired by CBS for $362.5 million. The transaction brought Pop Photo and its rival American Photographer under one roof. The magazine celebrated its 50th anniversary with its January 1987 issue. The CBS Magazines unit was later sold off to its management group in 1987. Diamandis Communications Inc., as the new company was called, was then sold to Hachette S.A. just six months later in 1988 for $712 million. Diamandis remained as the United States arm of its French parent company.

In 1989, Diamandis Communications purchased Modern Photography, a smaller rival of Popular Photography, and merged the magazines increasing circulation to between 500,000 and 689,000.

Popular Photography changed hands once again when Bonnier Corporation purchased five magazines from Hachette Filipacchi Media U.S. in 2009.

In 2016, the magazine became a bi-monthly publication. In early March 2017, it folded completely due to declining advertising revenue from the consumer camera industry. The March/April 2017 issue was its last and circulation had fallen to 320,000. The website was also shut down. In May 2017, Bonnier was offering to fulfill Pop Photo subscriptions by sending other magazines.

Following the publication's shutdown, the website was relaunched in December 2021. However, the revival proved to be short-lived and was shut down again in November 2023.

== See also ==
- Modern Photography
