= Brodsworth Colliery =

Former coal mine in South Yorkshire, England

Coordinates: 53°33′53″N 1°12′33″W

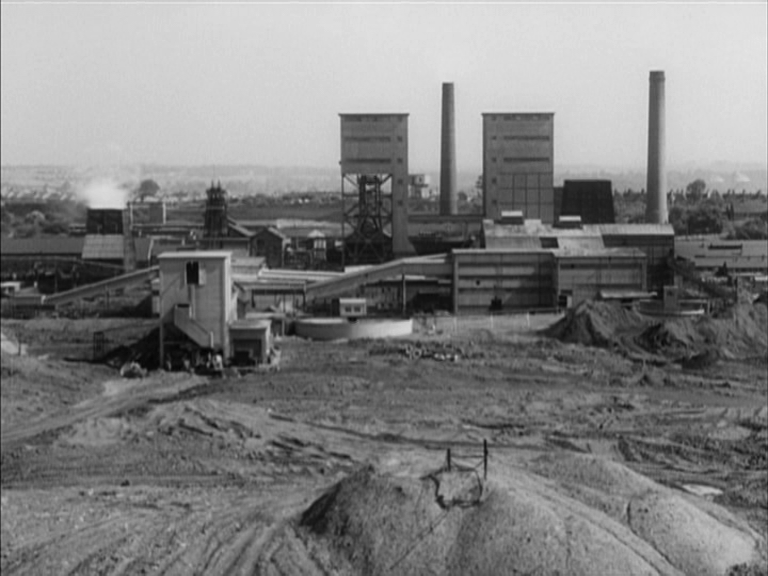
Brodsworth Colliery around 1967

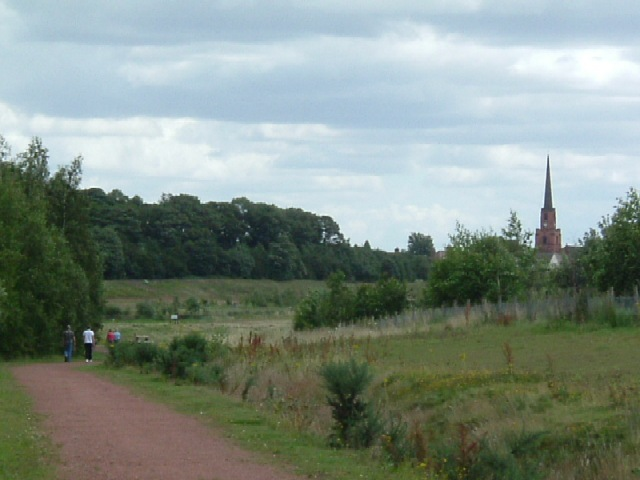
Woodland on the site of the former colliery

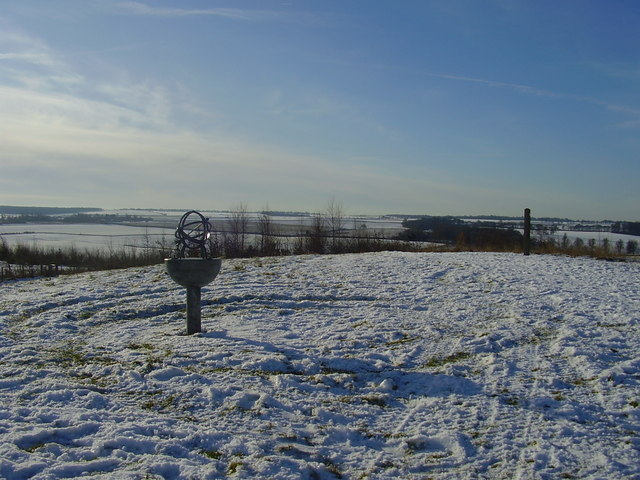
Top of the spoil tip

Brodsworth Colliery was a coal mine north west of Doncaster and west of the Great North Road. in South Yorkshire, England. Two shafts were sunk between October 1905 and 1907 in a joint venture by the Hickleton Main Colliery Company and the Staveley Coal and Iron Company.

The colliery exploited the coal seams of the South Yorkshire Coalfield including the Barnsley seam which was reached at a depth of 595 yards and was up to 9 feet thick. After a third shaft was sunk in 1923, Brodsworth, the largest colliery in Yorkshire, had the highest output of a three-shaft colliery in Britain.

The colliery and five others were merged into Doncaster Amalgamated Collieries in 1937 and the National Coal Board in 1947. It closed in 1990.

The colliery was consistently amongst those that employed the most miners in Britain, employing around 2,800 workers throughout the 1980s.

The company built Woodlands, a model village for its workers. Since the colliery closed, its spoil tip has been restored and developed as a community woodland; owned by the Land Restoration Trust and controlled by the Forestry Commission. Some of the colliery site has been sufficiently remediated to allow houses to be built upon it.

== See also ==
- List of collieries in Yorkshire 1984-present with dates of closure
