= A1077 road =

Road in North Lincolnshire

A1077

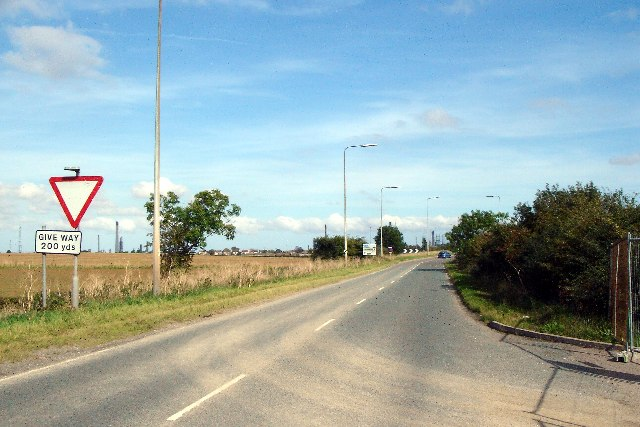
- Eastern terminus with the A160

Route information
- Length: 41.5 mi (66.8 km)

Major junctions
- West end: Gunness (Glanford Park), Scunthorpe
- A18 A1077(M) A1029; A15 A160
- East end: South Killingholme

Location
- Country: United Kingdom

Road network
- Roads in the United Kingdom; Motorways; A and B road zones
← A1076	→ A1078

The A1077 road runs through North Lincolnshire, England, between Scunthorpe and South Killingholme.

== Route ==
=== Scunthorpe to Barton ===
The western terminus of the A1077 starts at the M181 motorway Frodingham Grange roundabout in Gunness, next to the ground of Scunthorpe United F.C., a large Tesco, a Frankie & Benny's, the Gallagher Retail Park, and Travelodge Scunthorpe. It is Scunthorpe's northern ring road, built as the North West Orbital in stages 1, 2A, 2B and 3, funded by the ERDF, and known now as the Phoenix Parkway. There is left turn at the Neap House Junction for the B1216 for Gunness, in Flixborough, then the Skippingdale Roundabout for the Skippingdale Industrial Estate to the north and OSI Food Solutions to the south; this factory makes all the burgers for McDonald's in the UK - 3 million a day. There is the Foxhills Roundabout for the large Foxhills Industrial Estate, home of the national Nisa (retailer), then a roundabout for the B1430 for Normanby Hall and the Normanby Distribution Park, then a smaller roundabout for the Sawcliffe Industrial Estate to the south, and a roundabout with the A1029 (for Scunthorpe) at the Dragonby Vale Enterprise Park.

It passes through Roxby cum Risby, and Roxby, Lincolnshire itself. At Winterton, the north-south route has a staggered junction with the B1430. The eastwards route is the parish boundary between Winterton and Winteringham, with a right turn for the B1207 for Winterton. The landscape is flat, alongside the southern bank of the Humber. It meets the A15 at the grade-separated Barton on Humber Junction, built in 1978.

=== Barton to South Killingholme ===
The road passes west-east through the middle of Barton-upon-Humber. The road passes a former Kimberly-Clark factory, to the north, which made Huggies. It passes through Thornton Curtis and the Thornton Hunt, then Wootton, North Lincolnshire and the Nags Head. This section of the road is part of a larger north-west to south-east route that is known as Barton Street and leads onto the A18. At Ulceby Grange there is a T-junction, and a right turn for the B1211, for Croxton and Brigg. The road passes west-east through Ulceby, North Lincolnshire. Barton Street is the B1211 to the south, at a right turn, leading to the A18. At Ulceby railway station there is a level crossing with the Barton line, and the road enters South Killingholme, and passes the Yarborough Arms. A few hundred metres after the road is crossed by two 400kV pylon lines, the road has its eastern terminus at the A160 T-junction.

== A1077(M) ==
A1077(M)
- Location: Scunthorpe
- Length: 1.6 mi (2.6 km)
- Existed: 2021–present

The A1077(M) is a temporary motorway that was created in 2021 as part of the Lincolnshire Lakes project. It was created when the M181 was split in two because of a new roundabout that would connect to Brumby Common Lane. In 2025, the route was extended further south when the M181 was split a second time with the completion of a new roundabout that would connect to Burringham Road.
