= A.F. Budge =

British construction company

A.F. Budge was a British civil engineering and construction company based in Nottinghamshire. It built many sections of motorway in Yorkshire and the north Midlands.

== History ==
The parents of Tony Budge were Frederick Thomas Frank Budge, and Charlotte Constance Annie Parker, of 34 Norfolk Place, married on Thursday 29 September 1938 at Boston parish church.

His grandparents married on 18 January 1900 at Boston parish church. His grandmother Annie Everitt died aged 86 in Ewerby on 12 March 1967. His grandfather, Frederick William, was a furnace builder, who died suddenly on 17 October 1923 aged 45, who had lived at 55 Liquorpond Street. In January 1985 his father died in hospital. His father had formed a company in 1936.

Tony Budge went to Boston Grammar School, where he gained O-levels in English, English Literature, French, German, History, Geography, Maths, and Physics with Chemistry in 1955. He lived at 122 Tower Road in Boston.

He joined Holland Council in 1956, returning to his father's company in 1959, developing civil engineering contracts. He married on Thursday 14 July 1960 at Holy Trinity, his wife attended Boston High School; they lived at 19 Rowley Road. His brother Derek married Carol Garner on Thursday 17 September 1964. Derek worked for his father's company

The company was established by Tony Budge (9 August 1939 - 3 February 2010) in December 1962. He was the older brother of Richard Budge, who established his coal mining business RJB Mining, also based in Bassetlaw. Richard Budge joined the company in 1966. Another director of the company was Janet Budge, Tony's wife. Tony had trained as a civil engineer with Holland County Council. He had three daughters and a son, and married Janet Cropley, from Frith Bank, near Boston. He was a fellow of the ICE and IHT. In the 1970s he lived at Meed House on North Road in Retford. In July 1984 his daughter Elizabeth married Christian Brash at Retford church.

The company turned over £1.5m in 1968, when the company moved Retford to a former LNER engine depot. In January 1969, the Charterhouse Group bought 23% of the company. The company hoped to go public in the early 1970s. Tony Budge was given an OBE in the 1985 New Year Honours. In 1990, Tony Budge was Chairman of the Federation of Civil Engineering Contractors.

By 1990 Tony Budge was worth £60m. On Friday 1 June 1990 at 7.30pm, he was featured on the BBC2 regional series 'Keeping Tracks'. In November 1990 he handed out prizes at the Giles School in Old Leake.

RJB Mining was formed from a management buyout in February 1992 for £107m.

=== Mining ===
The company had an opencast mine in the 1970s at Esh Winning and West Chevington (Northumberland). In the early 1990s, it opened the Whitehouse Colliery, near the former Fontburn Halt railway station.

In 1991, it operated nine opencast mines. In August 1991, British Coal Opencast gave the company a £16m contract for its Colliersdean site in Northumberland.

=== Horseracing ===
Anthony Frederick Budge liked racehorses, and his company invested in Doncaster Racecourse. Danish Flight won the Arkle Challenge Trophy at Cheltenham in 1988; Rock City, ridden by Willie Carson, won the Coventry Stakes at Ascot in 1989; Sharp N' Early won the Gimcrack Stakes at York in 1988 and the Leisure Stakes at Windsor in 1990; Rock City with Willie Carson won the Gimcrack Stakes in 1989 and River Falls won the race in 1991; Uncle Ernie won the Lightning Novices' Chase at Doncaster in 1991; Showbrook won the Woodcote Stakes at Epsom in 1991. In the early 1990s, he had 20 horses with trainer Jimmy FitzGerald.

The company owned Retford Gamston Airport. Tony Budge lived at Osberton Hall at Scofton (in Worksop), the former home of Francis Ferrand Foljambe, near the River Ryton, off the B6079 between Worksop and Retford.

The company's horse-racing colours

=== Receivership ===
A.F. Budge (Road Materials) Ltd went into well-publicised receivership on 9 December 1992, undertaken by Cork Gully, with £96.6m debts, under the Insolvency Act 1986. As a road construction company, it was profitable, but the company made some disastrous investments in other areas in the late 1980s. During 1992 the company had reduced its debt by £30m, but blamed Barclays Bank for forcing it into receivership.

The company was bought by Alfred McAlpine Construction of Chester on Monday 4 January 1993, with 26 outstanding road contracts, according to its managing director Peter Hulmes. 250 of the 370 road-building employees were kept.

The company, and RJB Mining, were investigated in the King Coal edition of Panorama on 1 May 1995. The civil engineering business was bought by Alfred McAlpine in January 1993.

== Structure ==
The company, also known as A. F. Budge (Contractors), was based in Retford (Ordsall) in Bassetlaw, north Nottinghamshire, directly west of Retford railway station.

== Projects ==
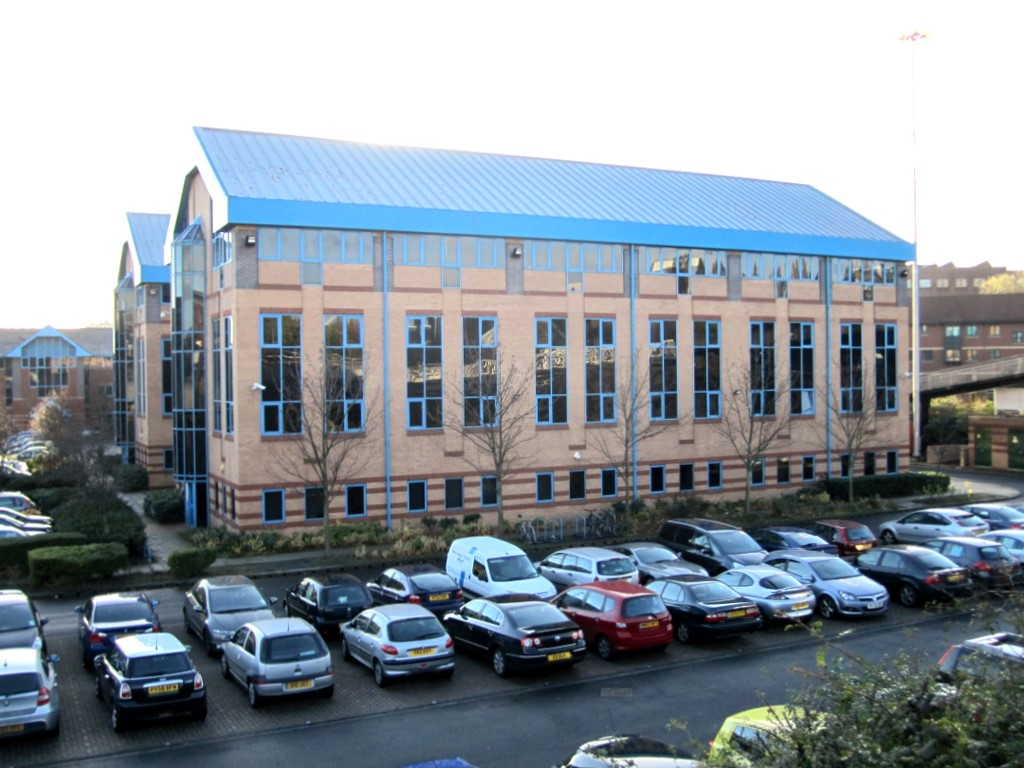
Newcastle Technopole Business Centre, built by AF Budge (Estates), it now forms part of the Newcastle Helix

It built the Central Business and Technology Park in central Newcastle next to the A167(M) and the A193 junction; this became King's nor Central Business and Technology Park, on the site of a former railway station. Universal Building Society moved its HQ there in June 1992. It built the Eureka! (museum) in West Yorkshire in the early 1990s.

=== Universities ===
In January 1991, it had a £14m contract for Newcastle Science Park (5.5 acres), which is next to Manors Metro station and Manors railway station, with a 284-vehicle car park; it received £2.5m from the Tyne and Wear Development Corporation, with the Chief Executive being Alastair Balls; Michael Portillo dug the first section on Thursday 21 February 1991.

=== Roads ===
It built many bypasses including the Lincoln Relief Road.

- A642 Horbury bypass, started September 1966, £455,000, built as a three-lane road
- A18 dualling, Mortal Ash Hill, £103,800, started March 1968
- A19 south of Clack Lane End to north end of Borrowby diversion, five miles, £956,000 to finish in 1971
- A638 2-mile Ossett bypass, £950,000
- A1174 Beverley eastern bypass, opened 1 March 1973, £240,000
- A610 Kimberly-Eastwood bypass (1974, started March 1973) £2,324,519
- A1(M) Lemsford - Welwyn (to the south end of the Stevenage bypass), 3.75 miles £2m, opened at 12pm on Friday 10 August 1973, nine months early, with dinner in the Heath Lodge Hotel
- Rotherham inner bypass Stage 3 £1.15m
- A664 Middleton inner ring road £698,000
- Queen's Medical Centre access roads with Clifton Boulevard (A52), £760,000 Trent Regional Health Authority
- A59 Upper Poppleton, £284,000 improvement, opened six months early in October 1974, 1 km realignment
- M621 Leeds South West Urban Motorway and Ingram Road Distributor £5.5m, connecting the M621 motorway spur to the north end of the M1, 4 km, five interchanges, to take 27 months, for West Yorkshire Metropolitan County Council; work began on Monday 9 December 1974
- Doncaster Southern Relief Road, started 1975, £1,046,691
- A15 Humber Bridge north approach road, and toll plaza (completed 1978, started 29 September 1975) £2,880,084, to take 117 weeks
- A61 Barnsley Eastern Relief Road, £2.5m originally £1.8m, opened Monday 15 September 1975
- M180 Trent to Scunthorpe 1.3 miles, 2.5 miles of M181 Brumby Common Link (1978, started 1976) £4,442,567
- A1 and A638 £2.4m Redhouse grade separation, opened July 1979
- A1 Darrington grade separation, improvement to Darrington crossroads, started November 1978, contract £1,470,820, to take two years
- A180 Brigg-Ulceby (1983, started Tuesday 5 May 1981) 7.75 miles, opened in late March 1983
- A638 Retford Eastern Relief Road, £2m, took 11 months, opened four months early on Friday 26 June 1981
- A61 Stores Road diversion £3m, opened 14 October 1981, six months early
- A6009 Mansfield Inner Relief Road Stage 2, opened August 1982, £1.4m northern section
- A56 Accrington Easterly By-Pass, southern section £8.5m
- A43 Bulwick bypass 1.7 miles £2m, work started 24 June 1985, to take 18 months
- A15 Lincoln Canwick Road tidal flow £490,000, work started Monday 8 July 1985
- A57 Worksop bypass, was opened on Thursday 1 May 1986, by Michael Spicer, and the Chairman of Bassetlaw council; was due to open in October 1986
- A45 Higham Ferrers bypass, 1.5 miles, opened 1986, started June 1985, £5m, single carriageway but land was bought to make dual carriageway, opened 15 weeks early by local MP Peter Fry
- A52 Bingham bypass £2.2m, opened ten months early, by Kenneth Clarke on Monday 8 December 1986
- Castle Bridge Road in central Nottingham (now the Castle Marina Retail Park)
- A43 Brackley bypass £6,987,027, two miles, started April 1986, opened at 3pm on Thursday 20 August 1987 by Ivon Moore-Brabazon, 3rd Baron Brabazon of Tara, completed early; on Wednesday 25 March 1987 construction worker 50-year old Willam Doyle was killed when struck on the head by a drainage pipe, being taken to Horton General Hospital
- A52 improvement near Friskney, £1.1m
- A45 Daventry, section of the bypass, £500,000
- A42 Ashby and Measham bypass, started 1987, £31m, 6.5 miles; opened Friday 11 August 1989, driven in a 1923 8-litre Bentley by Tom Wheatcroft
- A38 Sutton-in-Ashfield bypass (opened 1989)
- A46 Newark Relief Road £31.6m, work started Monday 18 April 1988
- A14 Kettering to Thrapston (A605), £25,660,650, former A604 contract in April 1989, the first of ten contracts for the 45-mile road, construction started May 1989, 6.5 miles; opened Thursday 15 November 1990
- A42 Castle Donington North section, final section, £24,730,505, to take 21 months, 6.5 miles Diseworth to Lount, started on 11 August 1989; opened on Thursday 23 May 1991 by Christopher Chope, in 8-litre Bentley of Tom Wheatcroft
- A47 Norwich bypass, Trowse to Postwick section
- A650 Drighlington bypass, £4.9m, started March 1990; opened by Christopher Chope on Thursday 21 November 1991
- A38/A564 roundabout, £6.5m, contract August 1990
- A52 Sherwin Arms Junction improvement, started January 1992, £463,107, to take six months, opened around August 1992
- A516 Etwall bypass (1992, work started Monday 14 January 1991), £2.66m, 1.25 miles, to take fifteen months, opened two months early at 12.55pm on Thursday 6 February 1992 by Patrick McLoughlin, with Edwina Currie in attendance
- A41 Kings Langley bypass (1993, after bankruptcy)
- A611 Hucknall Bypass stage 2 (southern section, went bankrupt in December 1992, completed by Alfred McAlpine), opened Tuesday 23 February 1993
- A6009 Mansfield inner relief road, stage 3, Bath Lane to A617 Chesterfield Road South, started June 1993 by McAlpine; opened around July 1994
