= Melton Ross =

Village in North Lincolnshire, England

Coordinates: 53.587633°N 0.357843°W

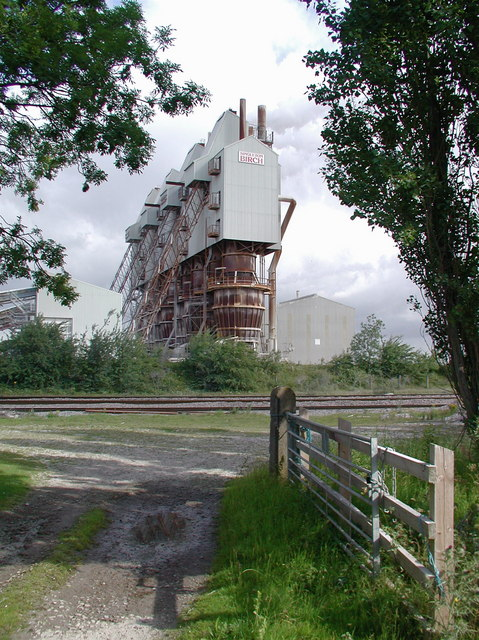
Melton Ross Quarries

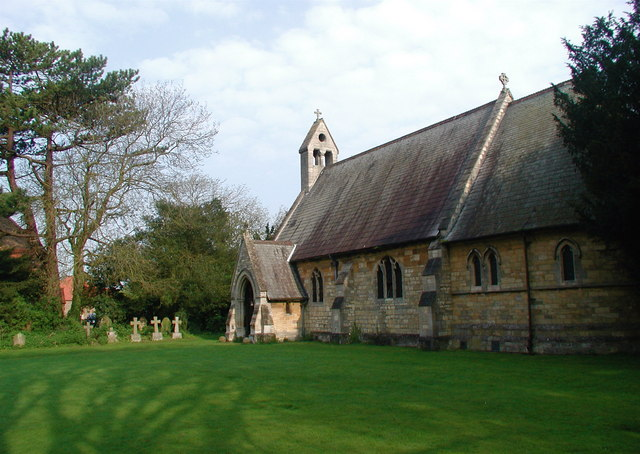
Church of the Ascension, Melton Ross

Melton Ross is a small village in North Lincolnshire, separated from New Barnetby by a railway line and level crossing. The 2001 census found 186 people in 77 households, the population increasing marginally to 188 at the 2011 census.

== Geography ==
Traffic through the village increased with the opening of Humberside Airport, former RAF Kirmington, one mile to the east in 1974. The village lies on the busy A18 close to junction 5 of the M180 and Barnetby.

== Local economy ==
The brewery, Tom Woods, is at Melton High Wood next to the A180 main road.

== History ==
The village was originally known as Medeltone, meaning "middle farmstead" while Ross refers to the de Ros family, who used to own all the land which is now the village.

The de Ros family had a stronghold in the village, the mound of which can still be seen in what is now a farmer's field.

The de Ros family had a long feud with the Tyrwhit family from the nearby village of Kettleby. According to legend in 1411 the Tyrwhits attacked Melton Ross Manor with 500 men. The disagreements continued, and some 200 years later James I erected gallows at a point close to the village, ordering that any deaths from the feud be treated as murder. The gallows are still standing, between Melton Ross and the nearby village of Wrawby.

The village has no shops, with the post office now shut. The Methodist chapel has been converted into holiday homes, but the Church of The Ascension still stands. It was built in 1867 when a former church on the site was destroyed by fire. The new church was designed by the architect E. Christian.
