= A18 =

A18 or A-18 is a three-character acronym that may refer to:

- A18 road (disambiguation), in several countries
- A-18 Shrike, a Curtiss Model 76A twin radial engine monoplane service test aircraft of the mid-1930s
- Aero A.18, a Czech fighter aircraft built in the 1920s
- Apple A18, a system on a chip mobile processor designed by Apple Inc
- Samsung Galaxy A18, an Android-based smartphone from Samsung
- Arrows A18, a Formula One car
- British NVC community A18 (Ranunculus fluitans community), a plant community
- Cunninghamella A18, a fungus strain
- English Opening in chess (Encyclopaedia of Chess Openings code A18, among others)
- Subfamily A18, a rhodopsin-like receptors subfamily
- F/A-18 Hornet, an all-weather carrier-based strike fighter designed to fill the roles of fighter aircraft and attack aircraft
- Asakusa station of the Toei Subway (station number A18)
