= Burnham, Lincolnshire =

Village in North Lincolnshire, England

Coordinates: 53.64°N 0.40°W

Burnham
- Location within Lincolnshire
- OS grid reference: TA057171
  - London: 145 mi (233 km) S
- Civil parish: Thornton Curtis
- Unitary authority: North Lincolnshire
- Ceremonial county: Lincolnshire
- Region: Yorkshire and the Humber
- Country: England
- Sovereign state: United Kingdom
- Post town: ULCEBY
- Postcode district: D39
- Police: Humberside
- Fire: Humberside
- Ambulance: East Midlands
- UK Parliament: Brigg and Immingham

Burnham is a village in North Lincolnshire, England. It forms part of the civil parish of Thornton Curtis.
