= M180 motorway =

Motorway in England

M180
- M180 highlighted in blue

Route information
- Part of E22
- Maintained by National Highways
- Length: 25.5 mi (41.0 km)
- Existed: 1977–present
- History: Constructed 1975–79

Major junctions
- West end: Stainforth
- M18 motorway J1 ->A18 road M181 motorway J4 ->A15 road
- East end: Elsham

Location
- Country: United Kingdom
- Primary destinations: Scunthorpe

Road network
- Roads in the United Kingdom; Motorways; A and B road zones
← M90	→ M181

The M180 is a 25.5-mile-long (41 km) motorway in eastern England, starting at junction 5 on the M18 motorway in Hatfield, within the Metropolitan Borough of Doncaster, South Yorkshire, and terminating at Barnetby, Lincolnshire, some 10 miles (16 km) from the port of Immingham and 14 miles (23 km) from the port of Grimsby. The A180 road continues to the east for Grimsby, Cleethorpes and Immingham. Scunthorpe, Lincoln, Hull (via the Humber Bridge), Brigg, Bawtry and the Isle of Axholme can be accessed using the motorway. Humberside Airport, the now-closed Doncaster Sheffield Airport, and the Killingholme, Humber and Lindsey oil refineries are close to the motorway. The road forms part of the unsigned Euroroute E22 and is the main route along the south bank of the Humber Estuary.

== History ==
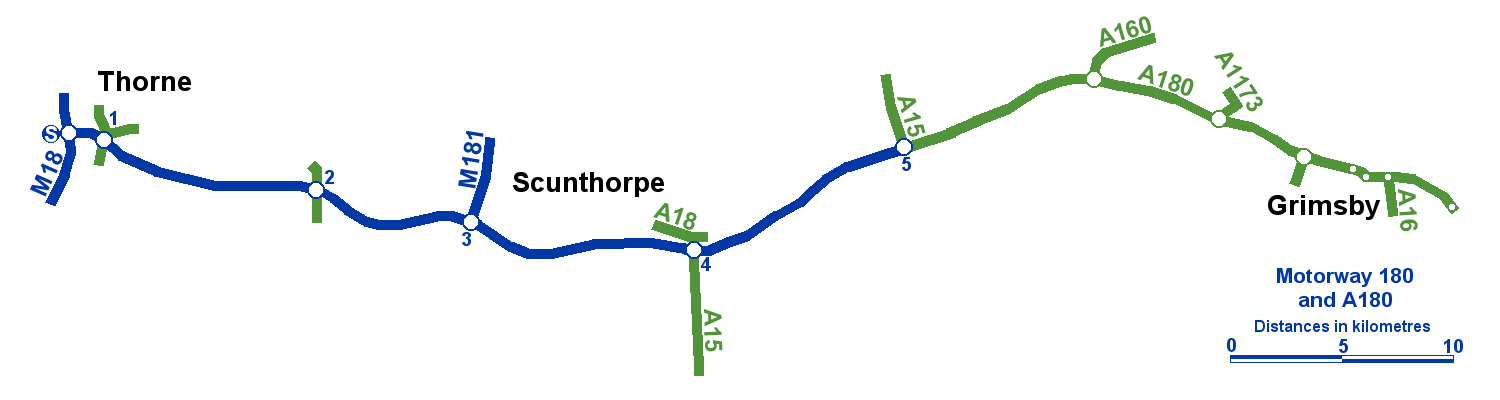
Plan of the M180 and A180

=== Planning and construction ===
The motorway bypass around Brigg was discussed for many years, but the Flixborough explosion gave it more importance, and was built three years later in 1977 as the second section of the motorway. At this time the A15 ran through Hibaldstow and Redbourne to Brigg, and the junction with the motorway was at Castlethorpe Corner, about 1 mile (1.6 km) east of the current A15 junction on the line of the Roman Ermine Street. The initial, and somewhat diminutive section of the motorway was the short-lived A18(M) also known as the Tudworth Link, which connected the roundabout junction with the M18 to the A18/A614. The easterly A18(M) sliproad is still used, though the original roundabout at junction 1 has now been replaced by a bridge close to Tudworth Hall Farm. The last section to be built was the Trent viaduct, opened in October 1979 by Kenneth Clarke, despite being 43 weeks late on account of strikes and bad weather.

Draft proposals were announced at the end of May 1973; there would be a bridge over the Trent at East Butterwick; there would be a 2.6-mile spur road to Scunthorpe, joining the A18 1000 yards west of the Berkeley Circle roundabout, with a motorway junction on Bottesford Moor; the 11.6 miles of new motorway, to the M181, would cost £16m.

The motorway is built to dual three-lane standard for most of its duration (aside from a short dual two-lane section past Scunthorpe), and is quite straight and flat.

The M180 has its own spur – the M181. While the M180 has to make do with a roundabout junction with the M18, its spur has a large, freeflowing trumpet interchange. At the start of the M180 are the Doncaster North services, owned by Moto.Doncaster North

=== Contracts ===
- M18 to Sandtoft, £4.8m, Monk
- Trent Bridge, £3.8m, Cementation Construction, opened to westbound traffic on 20 July 1979, opened to eastbound traffic on Wednesday 31 October 1979; the 364 precast units, weighing between 35 and 75 tonnes, were made at Tallington by Dow-Mac
- Trent to Scunthorpe, A.F. Budge of Retford
- Scunthorpe Southern Bypass, Balfour Beatty Clugston Joint Venture, opened by Bill Rodgers, Baron Rodgers of Quarry Bank, at the Ermine Street Interchange, on Friday 15 December 1978; opened the same day as the final stretch of the M18

=== A180 extension ===
It was extended in the 1980s to trunk-road standard as the A180 which is a two-lane dual carriageway which continues on to Grimsby and Cleethorpes. In its early planning stages, it was to be named the A18.

The £18 million 6-mile (9.7 km) section from Brigg to Ulceby (A160) was opened on 29 March 1983 by Lynda Chalker, Baroness Chalker of Wallasey, and the £21 million 7-mile (11 km) section from Ulceby to Grimsby opened in late 1983.

== Junctions ==
County	Location	mi	km	Junction	Destinations	Notes
South Yorkshire	Thorne	0	0	— (Note: 53.591°N 0.987°W)	M18 - Doncaster ( M62 ) - Leeds, Hull	
South Yorkshire	Thorne	1.7	1.0	1 (Note: 53.590°N 0.963°W)	A18 - Hatfield A614 - Thorne, Bawtry	No Westbound exit or Eastbound entrance
North Lincolnshire	Woodhouse	7.3	11.8	2 (Note: 53.569°N 0.818°W)	A161 - Gainsborough, Goole	
North Lincolnshire	Scunthorpe	12.1	19.4	3 (Note: 53.556°N 0.710°W)	M181 - Scunthorpe	
North Lincolnshire	Scawby	18.7	30.1	4 (Note: 53.544°N 0.557°W)	A15 - Lincoln; A18 - Brigg, Scunthorpe	
North East Lincolnshire	Barnetby le Wold	25.4	40.9	5 (Note: 53.585°N 0.413°W)	A15 - Humber Bridge, Hull; A18 - Brigg, Humberside Airport A180 - Grimsby, Immingham	
1.000 mi = 1.609 km; 1.000 km = 0.621 mi: Incomplete access

*Ceremonial Counties & *Unitary authority areas

Coordinate list
