= Ulceby Skitter =

Hamlet in North Lincolnshire, England

Coordinates: 53.619999°N 0.300000°W

Ulceby
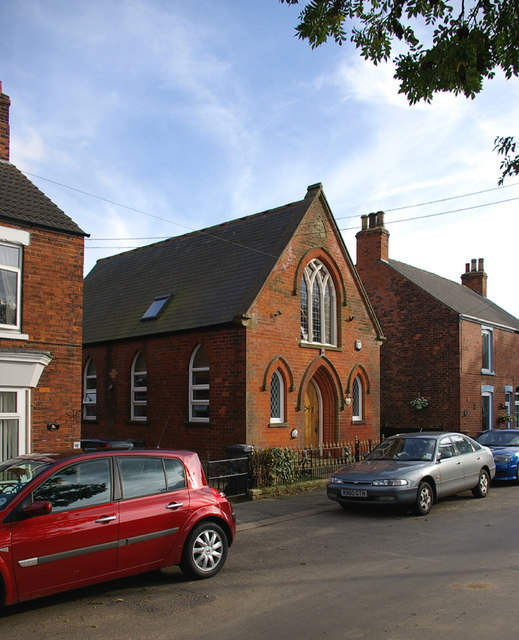
- Former chapel, Ulceby Skitter

- Location within Lincolnshire
- OS grid reference: TA125150
  - London: 155 mi (249 km) S
- Civil parish: Ulceby
- Unitary authority: North Lincolnshire
- Ceremonial county: Lincolnshire
- Region: Yorkshire and the Humber
- Country: England
- Sovereign state: United Kingdom
- Post town: ULCEBY
- Postcode district: DN39
- Police: Humberside
- Fire: Humberside
- Ambulance: East Midlands
- UK Parliament: Brigg and Immingham

Ulceby Skitter is a hamlet in North Lincolnshire, England. It is situated less than 1 mile (1.6 km) north-west from the Brocklesby Interchange of the A180 road, and 3 miles (5 km) west from Immingham. It is in the civil parish of Ulceby, a village 1 mile to the west, and is adjacent to Ulceby railway station.
