= M181 =

M181 or M-181 may refer to:

- M181 motorway, a motorway in England
- M-181 (Michigan highway), a former state highway in Michigan
