= A614 road =

Road in England

A614

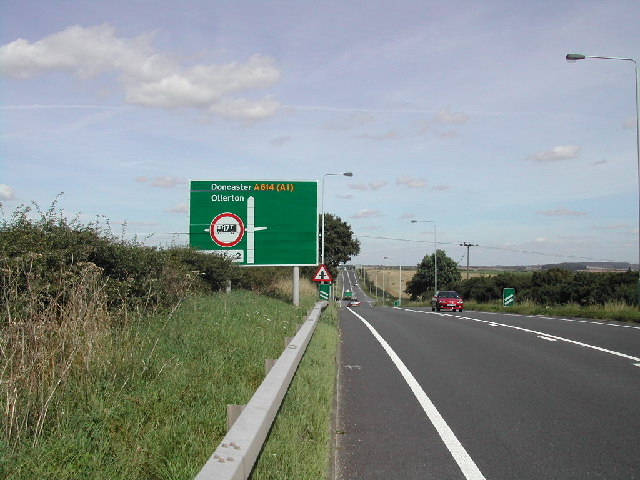
- The A614

Route information
- Length: 97.8 mi (157.4 km)

Major junctions
- South end: Redhill, Nottinghamshire; 53.0226°N 1.1323°W
- North end: Bridlington; 54.0859°N 0.2203°W

Location
- Country: United Kingdom
- Primary destinations: Goole

Road network
- Roads in the United Kingdom; Motorways; A and B road zones

The A614 is a main road in England running through the counties of Nottinghamshire, South Yorkshire and the East Riding of Yorkshire.

== Route ==
=== Nottingham to Blyth ===
Beginning at Redhill, the northernmost point in the Nottingham suburb of Arnold in Nottinghamshire, the road meets the A60 and A6097 at Redhill roundabout The Leapool Roundabout started construction around June 1965, to take 12 months, costing £113,600, built by Dyggor Contractors of Station Road in Ilkeston; it was 360ft wide, and 600 yds of the A614 was diverted, north of the roundabout.

At the A6097 junction, a triangle-shaped roundabout, the Warren Hill Gyratory, was built from May 1963, costing £24,000. This takes traffic from Gunthorpe Bridge.

In the mid-1930s the Ollerton and White Post crossroads would be lit. There have been frequent collisions at the White Post junction since the 1920s, with a smaller roundabout built in late 1934. An improved White Post roundabout was built from May 1957, costing £16,053, previously known as Locksell Hill crossroads. An accident killed 5 in late August 1966.

It passes Bilsthorpe. At Rufford there is a Center Parcs resort and Rufford Country Park. This is near to Edwinstowe, famed for its connections with Robin Hood. The road meets several other roads on a small roundabout at Ollerton with fuel stations and fast food outlets. A smaller Ollerton roundabout was built in late 1934. Before the M1 was built in 1966, Ollerton roundabout was often greatly congested with northern traffic. The Ollerton roundabout was enlarged around 1964, costing £44,000, with an RAC post.

Beech Clump crossroads are north of Ollerton. Perlethorpe was realigned and widened in 1969/70.

The road passes Clumber Park and goes past the entrance to the former Army Proteus training camp. The road passes over the River Poulter.

At Apleyhead Wood, the road meets the A1 and A57. In February 1955 it was announced that the main route would follow the A57 to Five Lane Ends, and further along the A614. Five Lane Ends (Apleyhead) was improved by February 1958, which cost £184,930. Apleyhead had the RAC Ranby service centre from November 1965. Major works were started on the Apleyhead junction in 2006 to convert the roundabout into a dual-grade junction (GSJ). This work was completed on 20 May 2008. The A614 overlaps the A1 for 6.3 miles (10.1 km) north.

There was a level crossing west of Retford, which was replaced from November 1957, and a roundabout at Ranby, Nottinghamshire, which was replaced by an underpass of the A620.

=== Blyth to Bridlington ===
At junction 34 of the A1(M) at Blyth, next to a large Moto service station, the road runs north to the settlement of Bawtry, passing to the south of a nearby colliery at Harworth.

South of Bawtry the road meets the A638, a Roman road which heads into Doncaster, at the Hawk's Nest junction, a dangerous junction with many fatal accidents. In 1953 the Transport Ministry constructed a new £6,000 junction 300 yards south of the former junction, being 30ft wide, and 100 yds long.

The route passes under the East Coast Main Line here. At Finningley, the road passes around the runway of Robin Hood Airport Doncaster Sheffield, the former RAF Finningley. The road has a level crossing with the Doncaster-Lincoln railway line and the River Torne is crossed. Near Hatfield Woodhouse, the road passes a prison. The road meets the M180 and A18 at a roundabout at Thorne, the former terminus of the A18(M), the M18 at junction 6, follows the River Don for 3.5 miles (5.6 km) then crosses it where the river becomes the Dutch River.

From Goole, the road continues in a north-easterly direction, crosses the M62 and passes over the River Ouse on the iron-girder Boothferry Bridge before intersecting with the M62 at junction 36.

From here, the road becomes a trunk road running through the settlements of Howden, Holme-on-Spalding-Moor, Driffield, ending on the Yorkshire coast at Bridlington, where it joins the A165.

== History ==
Before the mid-1930s, much of the route in mid-Nottinghamshire was scarcely a proper vehicular road, of a standard not much more than a grass track, along most of the route. Most traffic northwards had previously travelled via Worksop, along the A60. This Nottinghamshire improvement was built at same time as Gunthorpe bridge, from 1931 to 1934, being 60ft wide in total, with a 20ft-wide road.

=== Former route in Nottinghamshire ===
The road used to continue south from the junction with the A60, next to the Little Chef, and overlap the A60. The north-west section of the Nottingham western bypass, up to the A52 junction, near the Queen's Medical Centre (before the Clifton Boulevard was built) was the A614 for some time and is now the A6514. Before renumbering of Clifton Boulevard to the A52, concurrent with the numbering of the A614 to A6514, the section from the A52 to A606 was also A614.

=== Former route in the East Riding of Yorkshire ===
Originally, the A614 went from Thorne via Snaith to Selby. The current section from Goole through Rawcliffe was the A161 (from Gainsborough). From Goole to Holme-on-Spalding Moor, it was the A1041. From here through Market Weighton, to Driffield, it was the A163. From here to Bridlington, it used to be the A166 (which is the road from York). More recently, it finished at Holme-on-Spalding-Moor, then what is now the A614, carried on north as the A163 (from Selby), then as the A164 (from Beverley) just before Driffield.

=== Fatal accident in February 2009 ===
On Friday, 13 February 2009 just after 23:00 six people were killed in a head-on collision on the road in Nottinghamshire between the Bilsthorpe crossroads and the Eakring turn-off. The victims were four teenagers in one car, and an elderly couple in the other.

The cause of the accident was concluded by the coroner as to have happened as a result of "inappropriate overtaking" by the driver of the teenagers' car.
