= Elsham, Lincolnshire =

Village and civil parish in North Lincolnshire, England

Coordinates: 53.597375°N 0.440724°W

Elsham
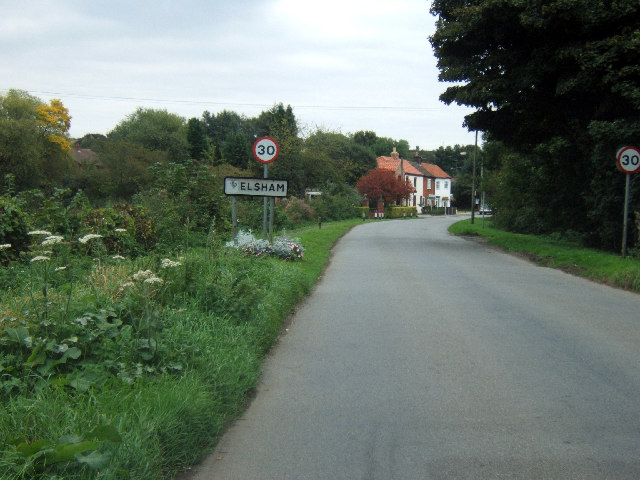
- Elsham

- Location within Lincolnshire
- Population: 400 (2011)
- OS grid reference: TA032123
  - London: 140 mi (230 km) S
- Unitary authority: North Lincolnshire
- Ceremonial county: Lincolnshire
- Region: Yorkshire and the Humber
- Country: England
- Sovereign state: United Kingdom
- Post town: Brigg
- Postcode district: DN20
- Police: Humberside
- Fire: Humberside
- Ambulance: East Midlands
- UK Parliament: Brigg and Immingham

Elsham is a village and civil parish in North Lincolnshire, England. The population of the civil parish at the 2011 census was 400. It is situated 4 miles (6 km) north from Brigg, 1 mile (1.6 km) north from the M180 and 1 mile (1.6 km) west from the A15 road.

Elsham's Grade II* listed Anglican church, dedicated to All Saints, is of 12th century Early English origin. It was restored in 1874.

== History ==
At Elsham there was an Augustinian priory; it was dissolved during the 1536 Suppression.

The village is the birthplace of the agricultural engineer Richard Hornsby, astronomer Wallace L. W. Sargent, and George Green, a recipient of the Medal of Honor in the American Civil War.

== Geography ==
The A15 (built in 1978) traverses the old runways of the former RAF Elsham Wolds airfield. Close to the village is Elsham Hall.

=== Service area ===
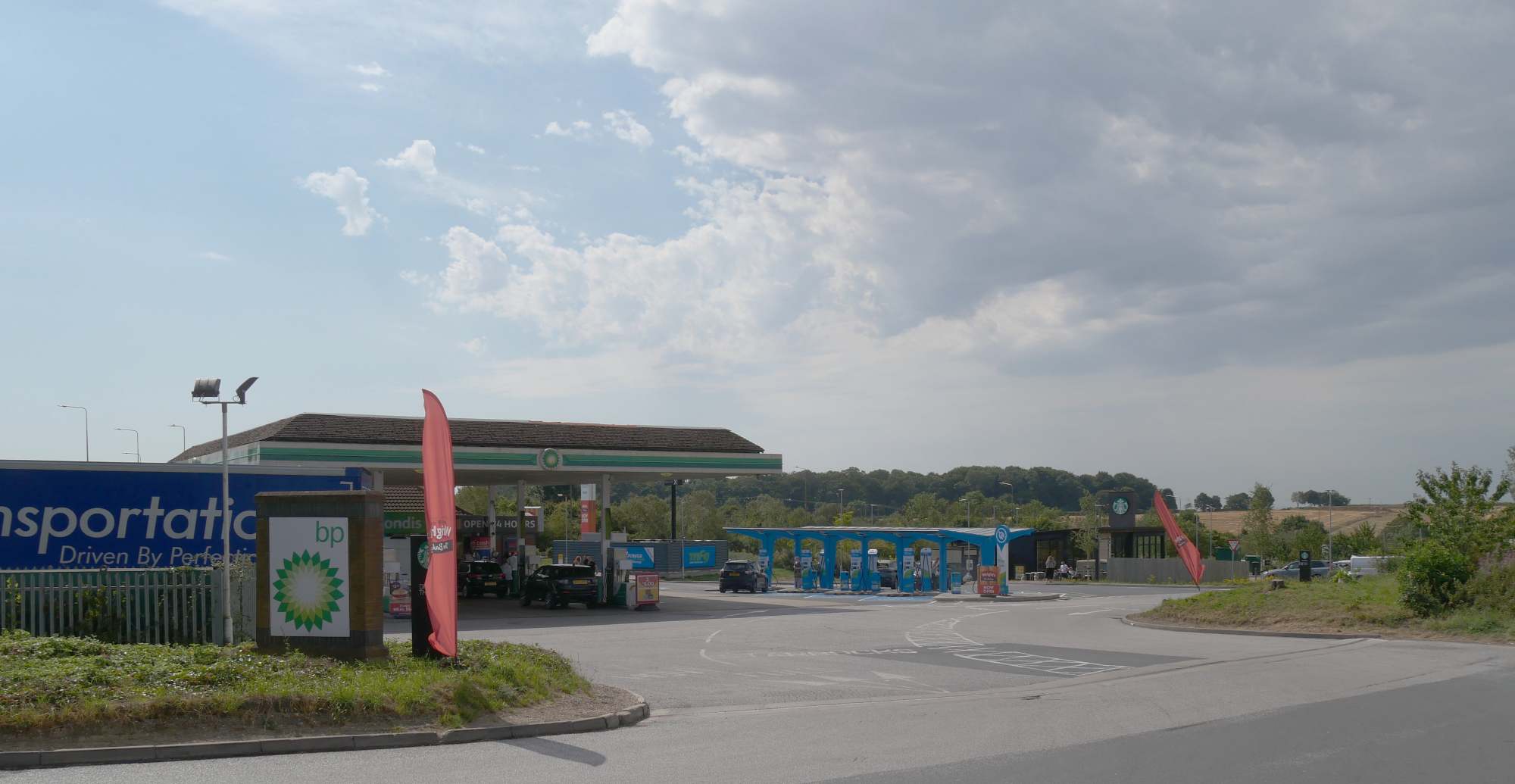
Barnetby services in August 2024

Barnetby services, with a Little Chef, started construction in July 1990. It was built by Marshall, and opened at the end of November 1990.

== Economy ==
Elsham is the home of the Pipers Crisp Co., winners of 23 "Great Taste Awards Gold" since 2007.
