= List of A18 roads =

This is a list of roads designated A18. Roads are sorted in the countries alphabetical order.

- A18 motorway (Belgium), a road connecting Bruges and Dunkirk, France
- A18 motorway (Italy), a road connecting Messina and Catania in Sicily
- A18 highway (Lithuania), a road around Šiaulių
- A18 road (Malaysia), a road in Perak connecting Bota Bota Kanan and Kampung Sungai Mengkuang
- A18 motorway (Netherlands), a road connecting Zevenaar and Varsseveld
- A18 autostrada (Poland), a planned road connecting Olszyna at the Polish-German border and the junction with the A4 motorway
- A 18 road (Sri Lanka), a road connecting Pelmadulla and Nonagama
- A18 motorway (Switzerland), a road connecting Basel and Reinach BL
- A18 road (United Kingdom) may refer to:
  - A18 road (England), a road connecting Doncaster, South Yorkshire and Ludborough, Lincolnshire
  - A18 road (Isle of Man) or Snaefell Mountain Road, a road used for the Isle of Man TT Races
- A18 road (United States of America) may refer to:
  - A18 road (California), a road connecting SR 273 (and Interstate 5 and SR 299) in Redding and Shasta Dam

== See also ==
- List of highways numbered 18
