= George Green (Medal of Honor) =

American soldier of the American Civil War

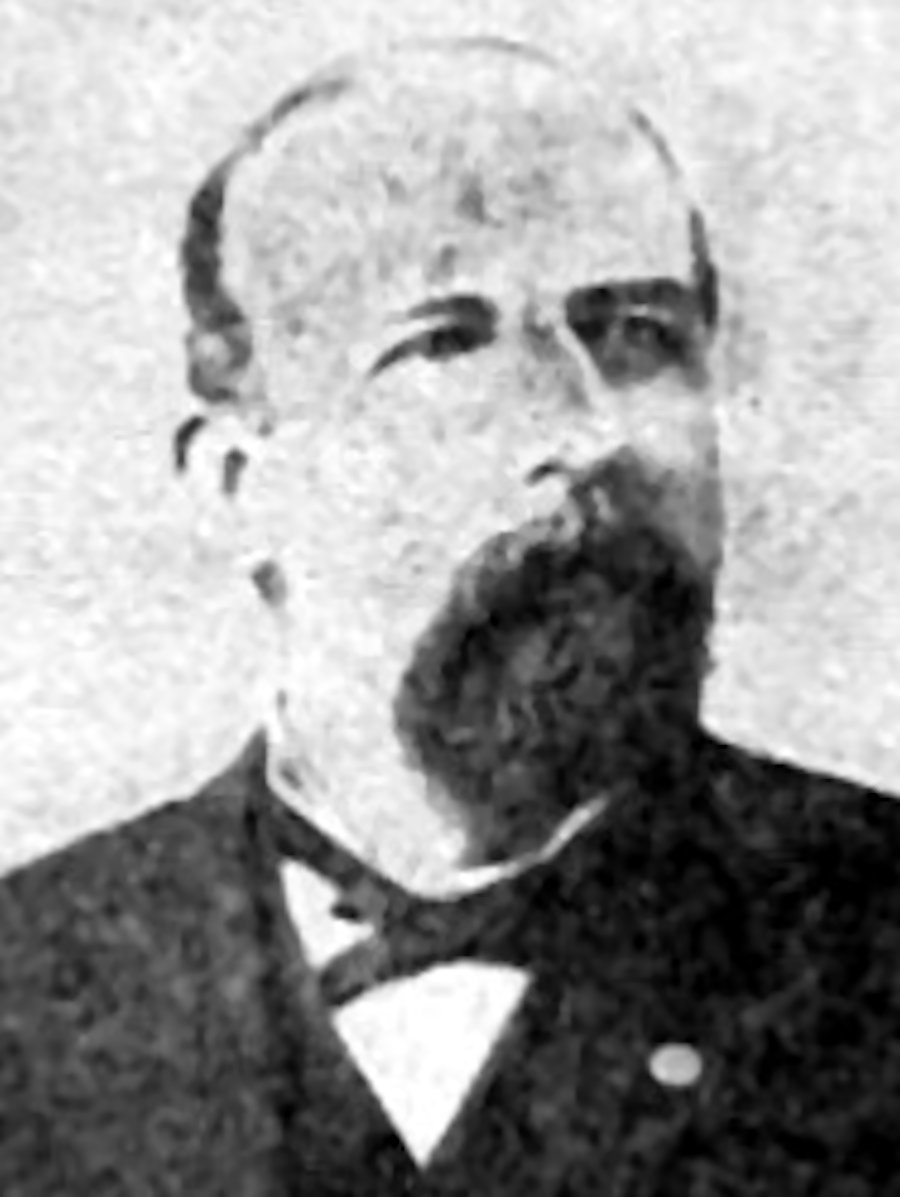
- Born: July 16, 1840; Elsham, England
- Died: February 10, 1898 (aged 57); Ohio, US
- Burial place: Troy, Ohio, US
- Military career
- Allegiance: United States of America
- Branch: United States Army
- Service years: 1861–1864
- Rank: Corporal
- Units: Company H, 11th Ohio Volunteer Infantry Regiment
- Conflicts: Battle of Chaffin's Farm; American Civil War
- Awards: Medal of Honor

George Green (July 16, 1840 – February 10, 1898) was an American soldier who fought in the American Civil War. Green received the United States' highest award for bravery during combat, the Medal of Honor. Green's medal was won for his actions in the Battle of Missionary Ridge, Chattanooga, Tennessee, on November 25, 1863. He was honored with the award on January 12, 1892.

Green was born in Elsham, England. He joined the US Army from Columbus, Ohio in April 1861, and mustered out with his regiment in June 1864. He was buried in Troy, Ohio.

== Medal of Honor citation ==
The President of the United States of America, in the name of Congress, takes pleasure in presenting the Medal of Honor to Corporal George Green, United States Army, for extraordinary heroism on 25 November 1863, while serving with Company H, 11th Ohio Infantry, in action at Missionary Ridge, Tennessee. Corporal Green scaled the enemy's works and in a hand-to-hand fight helped capture the flag of the 18th Alabama Infantry (Confederate States of America).

== See also ==
- List of American Civil War Medal of Honor recipients: G–L
