= A18 road (England) =

Road in England

A18

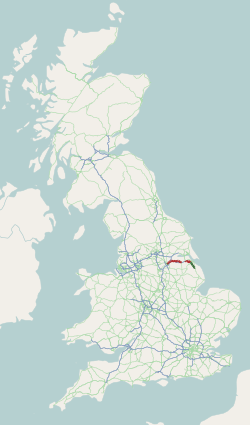

Route information
- Length: 58.2 mi (93.7 km)

Major junctions
- From: A630 in Doncaster; 53.5147°N 1.1386°W

- A638 in Doncaster M180 in Hatfield A1077(M) / A1077 in Gunness A159 in Scunthorpe M180 / A15 in Broughton A1173 in Riby A46 in Laceby
- To: A16 near Ludborough; 53.4338°N 0.0412°W

Location
- Country: United Kingdom
- Constituent country: England
- Counties: South Yorkshire, Lincolnshire
- Primary destinations: Scunthorpe

Road network
- Roads in the United Kingdom; Motorways; A and B road zones
← A17	→ A19

The A18 is a road in England that links Doncaster in South Yorkshire with Ludborough in Lincolnshire, via Scunthorpe and Grimsby. Much of its route has been superseded by the M180 motorway.

== Route ==
=== Doncaster – M180 ===
The A18 begins as a dual-carriageway and trunk road at the Balby Flyover junction with the A630 in Balby in Doncaster, under which runs the East Coast Main Line. It meets the A638 (former Great North Road) at the Sidings Roundabout then becomes Carr House Road, overlapping the A638. At the Racecourse Roundabout in Belle Vue, the A638 exits to the right (former Great North Road), and the road becomes Leger Way. Near Intake, it becomes a single carriageway and continues to Scunthorpe. At the Sandall Park Roundabout the road meets its old route and becomes Thorne Road. At the Shaw Lane Roundabout it meets the A630 and runs under a railway line. At the next roundabout, on the edge of Doncaster, the A630 leaves to the right, as a trunk road to the M18. The road, now without trunk (primary) status, passes through Edenthorpe.

The road enters Dunsville as High Street and becomes Doncaster Road. In Hatfield, it becomes Manor Road and then High Street, and crosses the M18. It becomes Epworth Road and meets the A1146 near Hatfield Woodhouse, then meets the A614 from the right from Finningley. The road becomes Tudworth Road and overlaps the A614; at the Tudworth Roundabout, the A18 continues to the right of the M180

=== M180 – Brigg ===
As High Levels Bank, it crosses a flat landscape known as Hatfield Chase and enters North Lincolnshire. It runs alongside the large North Engine Drain next to the M180. At Crowle, it meets the A161, close to junction 2 of the M180 and crosses Pilfrey Bridge over the Three Rivers. The A18 meets the B1392 (for Keadby) and passes through Gunness, crossing the B1216 (for Burringham) as Station Road. It meets the A1077 Scunthorpe ring road and the M181 at the Frodingham Grange Roundabout.

The road enters the Queensway Roundabout for the trunk road A159 at Old Brumby, becoming the non-trunk dual-carriageway Queensway. It passes through New Brumby, and at the Ashby Ville Roundabout it meets the A1029.

Mortal Ash Hill, previous a 1-in-11 hill was dualled by A. Monk Ltd of Padgate, from June 1963; it opened in 1964.

The road meets the Briggate Lodge Roundabout on the line of Ermine Street, for junction 4 for the M180 and the trunk-road A15.

=== Brigg – Ludborough ===
At Scawby Brook, there is a roundabout with the B1206 (for Scawby), and the road enters Brigg to the left as Scawby Road, becoming Bridge Street and then Ancholme Way. The B1206 (former A15) leaves to the left and the road enters Wrawby as Brigg Road and becomes Melton Road.

The road passes through Melton Ross and passes next to Humberside Airport. At the B1210 (for Brocklesby) junction, the road heads to the right, entering Lincolnshire and the district of West Lindsey, and passes through Great Limber as High Street. It meets the B1211 and heads to the right as Barton Street (a Roman road). Near Riby, the road becomes a trunk road (until its terminus) then a dual-carriageway close to where it enters North East Lincolnshire.

The road meets the A46 Grimsby road, and heads straight on over the roundabout. The A18 used to continue eastwards from here along the present A46 into Grimsby, and now continues southwards over Welbeck Hill along the former B1431. The boundary of Lincolnshire and North East Lincolnshire runs down the middle of the road for about 3 miles (4.8 km). The road re-enters Lincolnshire and the district of East Lindsey. The road follows the former A16 from Ludborough to near Utterby, where is meets the A16 (for Louth).

The last section, between the junction with the A46 at Laceby and the junction with the A16 at Ludborough, was designated by the Road Safety Foundation as the most dangerous in the country for car drivers, drawing on collated data on the number of fatal and serious-injury collisions in 2010. During a 2015 inquest, a coroner called for an independent review of the A18 near Grimsby; the coroner was reacting to the death of a family after a collision with a lorry. In 2016, the government announced that £175 million would be made available for safety improvements on roads like the A18.

== Gallery ==
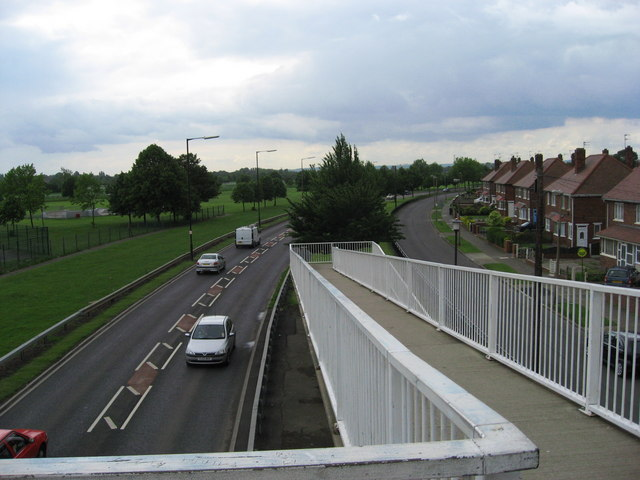
Leger Way in Doncaster next to Doncaster Racecourse

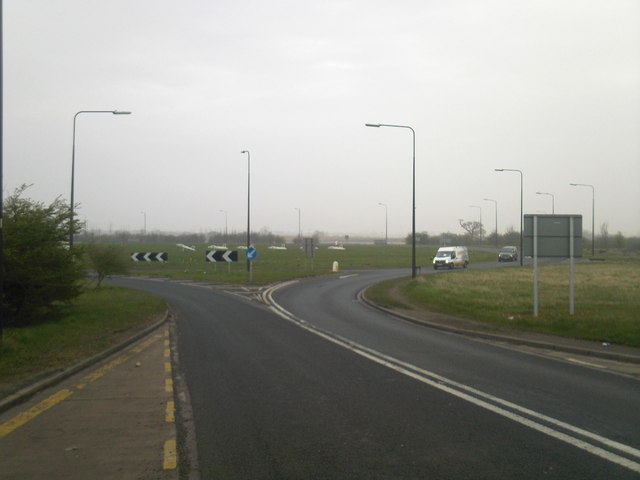
Tudworth Roundabout with the A614 and M180 – former A18(M)

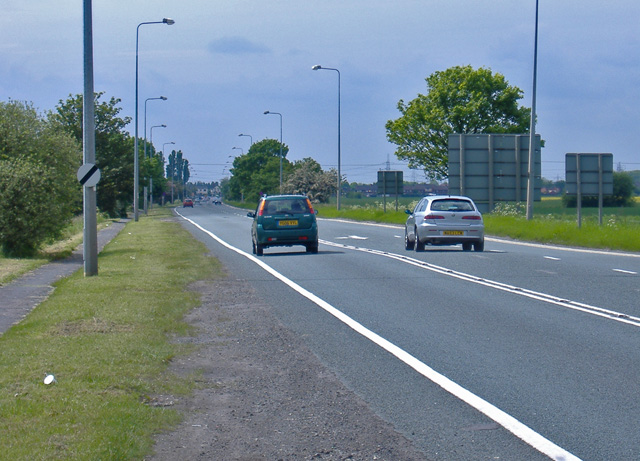
Gunness Straight west of Scunthorpe towards the Trent

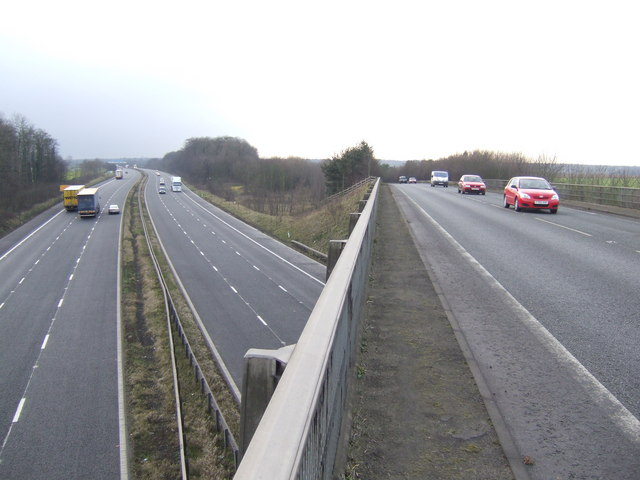
Crossing the M180 near Castlethorpe between Scunthorpe and Brigg

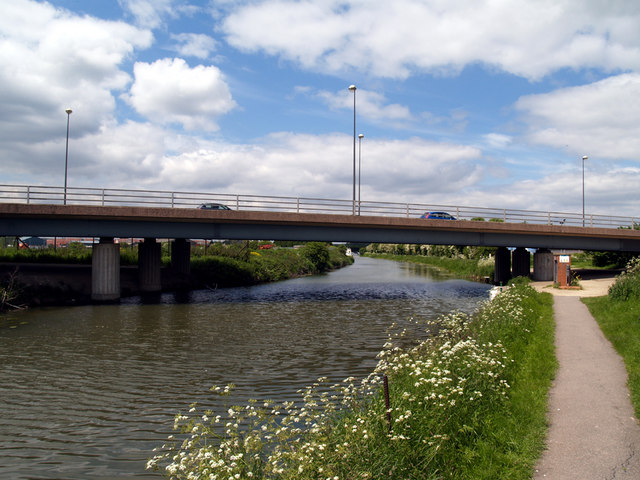
A18 in Brigg over the River Ancholme

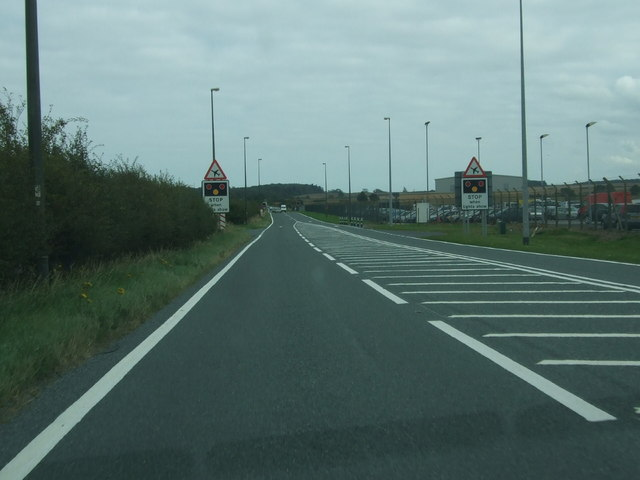
Passing Humberside Airport

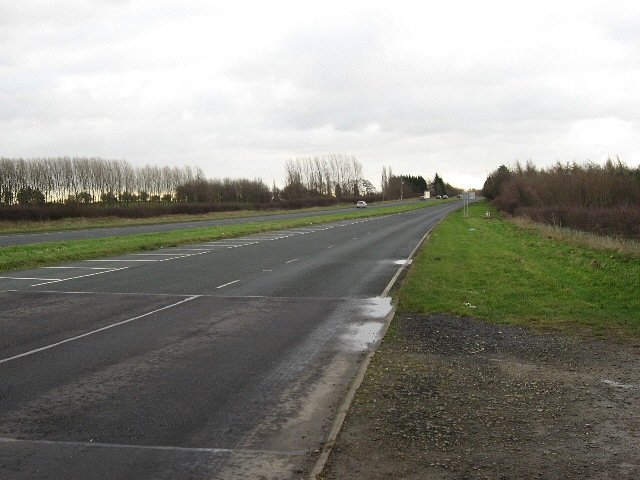
Approaching Laceby on one of the few dual carriageway sections on the Barton Street Roman road

== A18(M) motorway ==
A18(M)
- Location: Hatfield, South Yorkshire
- Length: 1.0 mi (1.6 km)
- Existed: 1972–1978

The A18(M) was a 1-mile-long (2 km) motorway that connected the M18, from what is now junction 5 north of Hatfield, South Yorkshire, to the A18. The A18(M) was built in 1972 but was redesignated after the M180 was built in 1978.

The western end of the M180 from M18 junction 5 to the junction 1 eastbound slip road was previously part of the A18(M). The eastbound slip road to the roundabout was the eastbound carriageway A18(M). About 0.5 miles (0.8 km) of the westbound A18(M) carriageway was abandoned when the M180 was built on a new alignment.

== Junction list ==
County	Location	mi	km	Destinations	Notes
South Yorkshire	Doncaster	0.0	0.0	A630 to A1(M) – Rotherham, The North	Western terminus
South Yorkshire	Doncaster	0.4	0.64	A638 north / A6182 south to A1(M) / M18 / M1 / M180 / A1 / A19 – The North, The South, Sheffield, Scunthorpe, Selby	To A1 and The North signed eastbound only; western terminus of A638 concurrency; northern terminus of A6182
South Yorkshire	Doncaster	1.4	2.3	A638 east / Bennetthorpe (Bawtry Road) – Bawtry, Doncaster town centre, Rossington, Cantley, Robin Hood Airport	Robin Hood Airport signed westbound only; eastern terminus of A638 concurrency
South Yorkshire	Doncaster	3.9	6.3	A630 west (Wheatley Hall Road) to Ogden Road / A1 / A638 – Wakefield, The North, Doncaster town centre	Doncaster town centre signed westbound only; western terminus of A630 concurrency
South Yorkshire	Edenthorpe–Armthorpe boundary	4.1	6.6	A630 / M18 / M180 / M62 – Scunthorpe	To M180 and M62 signed eastbound only; eastern terminus of A630 concurrency
South Yorkshire	Hatfield	8.8	14.2	A1146 north (Thorne Road)	Southern terminus of A1146
South Yorkshire	Hatfield	9.5	15.3	A614 south (Stone Hill) – Bawtry, Robin Hood Airport	Western terminus of A614 concurrency
South Yorkshire	Hatfield	10.3	16.6	M180 west to M18 / M62 – Scunthorpe, Leeds, Hull	
South Yorkshire	Hatfield–Thorne boundary	10.6	17.1	A614 north (Tudworth Road) – Thorne	Eastern terminus of A614 concurrency
Lincolnshire	Crowle and Ealand	16.8	27.0	A161 to M180 – Goole, Gainsborough	
Lincolnshire	Keadby–Gunness boundary	20.8– 20.9	33.5– 33.6	Keadby Bridge over River Trent	
Lincolnshire	Gunness	22.5	36.2	A1077(M) south / A1077 north-east to M181 / M180 / B1216 – Winterton, Hull, Grimsby, Doncaster, Flixborough	To B1216 and destinations signed eastbound only
Lincolnshire	Scunthorpe	24.7	39.8	A159 south / Ashby Road – Town centre, Messingham, Gainsborough, Ashby, Bottesford	Northern terminus of A159
Lincolnshire	Scunthorpe	26.6	42.8	A1029 north / Lakeside Parkway to A1077 / B1430 – Town centre, Winterton, Burton upon Stather, Flixborough	Southern terminus of A1029
Lincolnshire	Broughton	29.3	47.2	A15 / M180 / A180 – Lincoln, Grimsby, Doncaster	
Lincolnshire	Brigg	32.7	52.6	A1084 south-east to Bigby Road / B1434 – Caistor, Market Rasen, Bigby, Howsham	North-western terminus of A1084
Lincolnshire	Melton Ross–Barnetby le Wold boundary	36.6	58.9	M180 / A15 to Kings Road / A180 – Scunthorpe, Lincoln, Hull, Humber Bridge, Barnetby le Wold, Grimsby, Immingham	
Lincolnshire	Riby	46.1	74.2	A1173 (Riby Road) to A46 – Caistor, Immingham, Lincoln, Riby, Stallingborough, Healing	Brief concurrency
Lincolnshire	Laceby	48.2	77.6	A46 (Grimsby Road) – Lincoln, Grimsby, Market Rasen, Caistor, Cleethorpes, Laceby	
Lincolnshire	Ludborough–Utterby boundary	58.2	93.7	A16 (Main Road) to A1028 – Grimsby, Boston, Skegness, North Thoresby, Holton-le-Clay, Utterby, Louth, Mablethorpe	Eastern terminus
1.000 mi = 1.609 km; 1.000 km = 0.621 mi: Concurrency terminus
