= Croxton, Lincolnshire =

Civil parish in North Lincolnshire, England

Coordinates: 53.596912°N 0.349421°W

Croxton
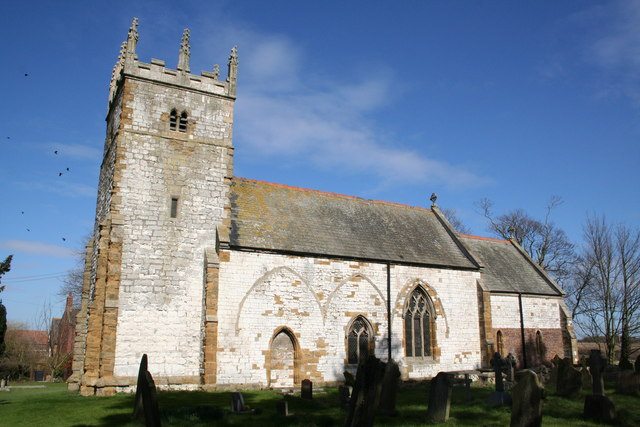
- Church of St John the Evangelist, Croxton

- Location within Lincolnshire
- OS grid reference: TA093124
  - London: 140 mi (230 km) S
- Unitary authority: North Lincolnshire
- Ceremonial county: Lincolnshire
- Region: Yorkshire and the Humber
- Country: England
- Sovereign state: United Kingdom
- Post town: Ulceby
- Postcode district: DN39
- Police: Humberside
- Fire: Humberside
- Ambulance: East Midlands
- UK Parliament: Brigg and Immingham

Croxton is a civil parish in North Lincolnshire, England. It is situated just south from the A180, 1 mile (1.6 km) north-west from Kirmington and 7 miles (11 km) west from Immingham.

In the 2001 census the parish had a population of 36. At the 2011 census the population remained less than 100 and is included in civil parish of Kirmington.

Croxton Grade II* listed Anglican parish church is dedicated to St John the Evangelist. The church, mainly Early English, was restored by James Fowler of Louth in 1876.

Within the parish is Yarborough Camp where Roman coins have been found.
