= Thornton Hunt Inn =

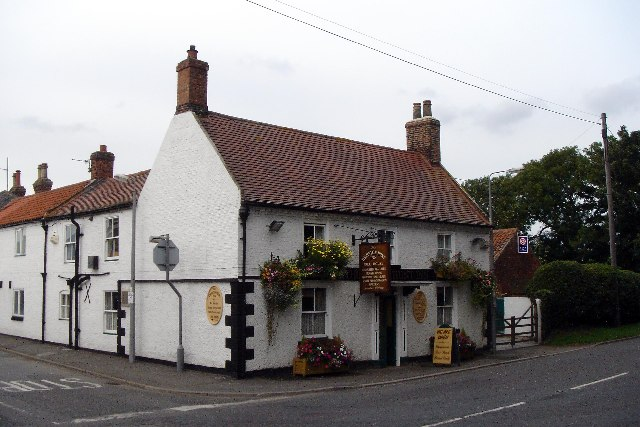

- Location within Lincolnshire
- 53.645831°N 0.35621835°W
- Location: Main Street, Thornton Curtis, Wootton, North Lincolnshire, England, DN39 6XW

History
- Built: 18th century

Site notes
- Architectural style: Vernacular

Listed Building – Grade II
- Designated: 17 October 1985
- Reference no.: 1227790

The Thornton Hunt Inn is a grade II listed building and working public house in Thornton Curtis, North Lincolnshire, England.

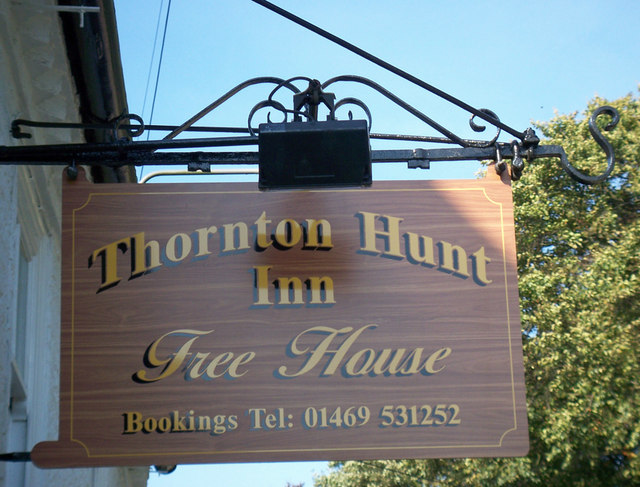
The sign of the Thornton Hunt
