= A15 road (England) =

Road in England

A15

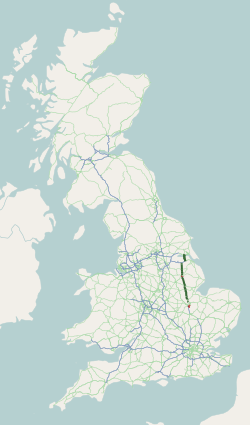

Route information
- Length: 97.7 mi (157.2 km)

Major junctions
- South end: A1(M) near Yaxley

- A47 in Peterborough A52 near Threekingham; A17 near Holdingham, Sleaford A158 / A1434 near Lincoln; A46 near Lincoln A631 at Caenby Corner M180 / A18 near Scawby A180 / A18 near Elsham A164 / A1105 in Hessle
- North end: A63 near Hessle

Location
- Country: United Kingdom
- Constituent country: England
- Primary destinations: Lincoln, Sleaford, Peterborough

Road network
- Roads in the United Kingdom; Motorways; A and B road zones
← A14	→ A16

The A15 is a major road in England. It runs north from Peterborough via Market Deeping, Bourne, Sleaford and Lincoln along a variety of ancient Roman roads and turnpike alignments before it is interrupted at its junction with the M180 near Scawby. The road restarts 10 miles (16 km) east, and then continues north past Barton-upon-Humber, crossing the Humber on the Humber Bridge before terminating at Hessle near Kingston upon Hull.

== Driving conditions ==
According to the AA, the route is 95 miles (153 km) long and should take 2 1/4 hours. Norman Cross to Bourne takes 33 minutes, Bourne to Lincoln takes 46 minutes, and Lincoln to the Humber Bridge takes 54 minutes.

A section of the A15 (between Scampton and the M180) provides the longest stretch of straight road in the UK.

== Route ==
=== Peterborough ===
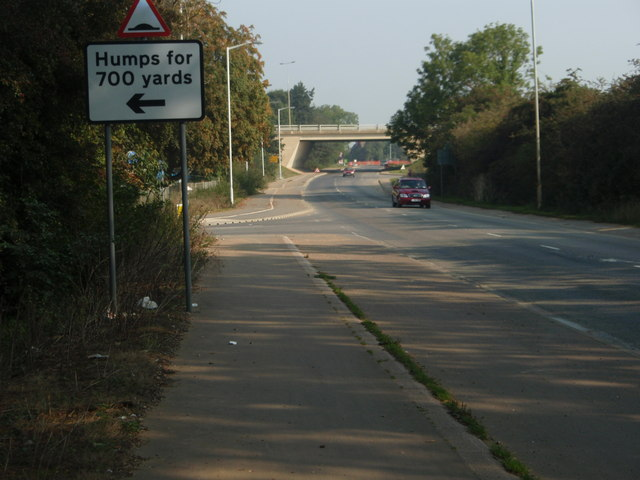
London Road looking north under the A1139 at Fletton

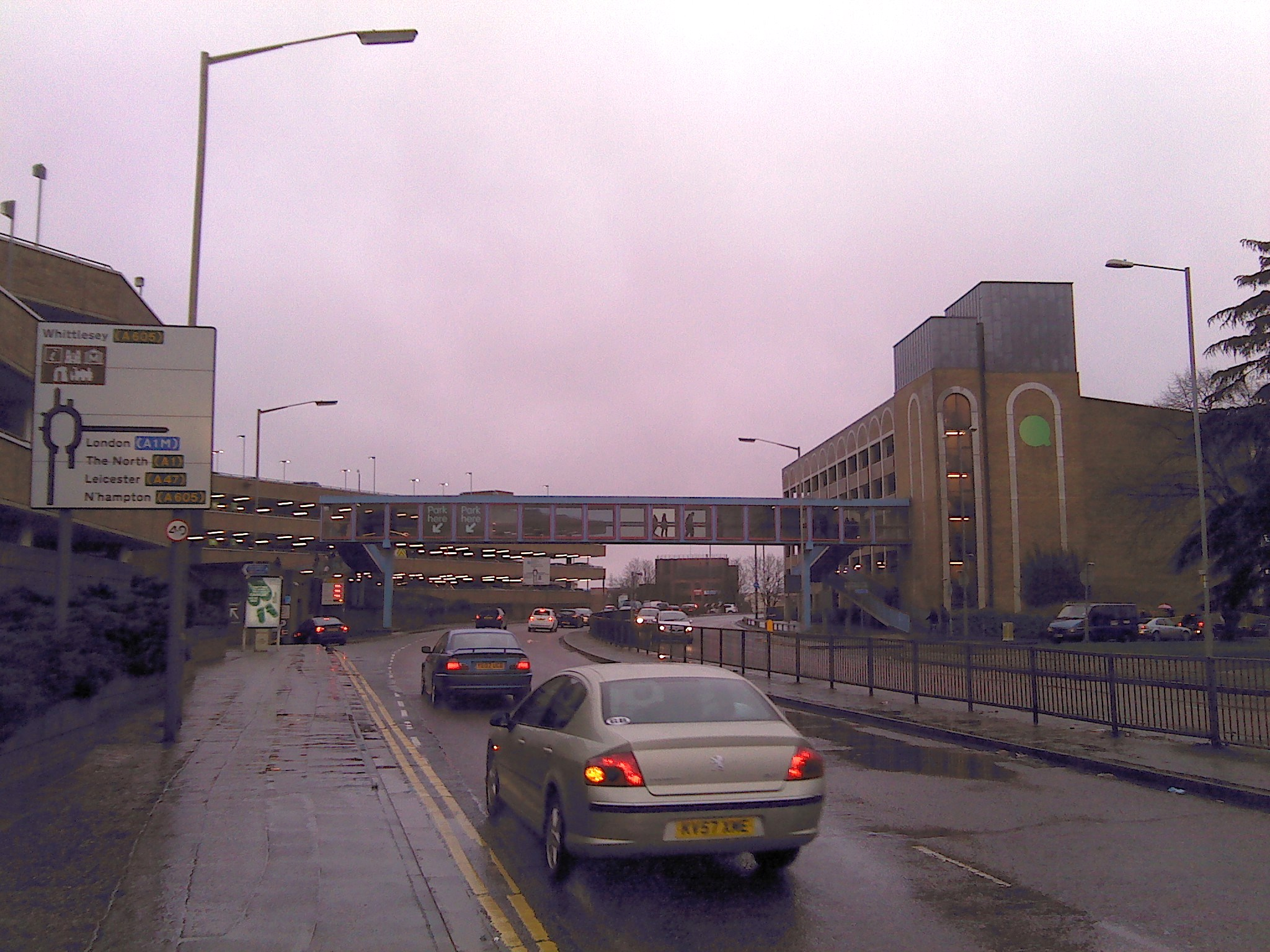
The A15 dual carriageway at Queensgate Shopping Centre

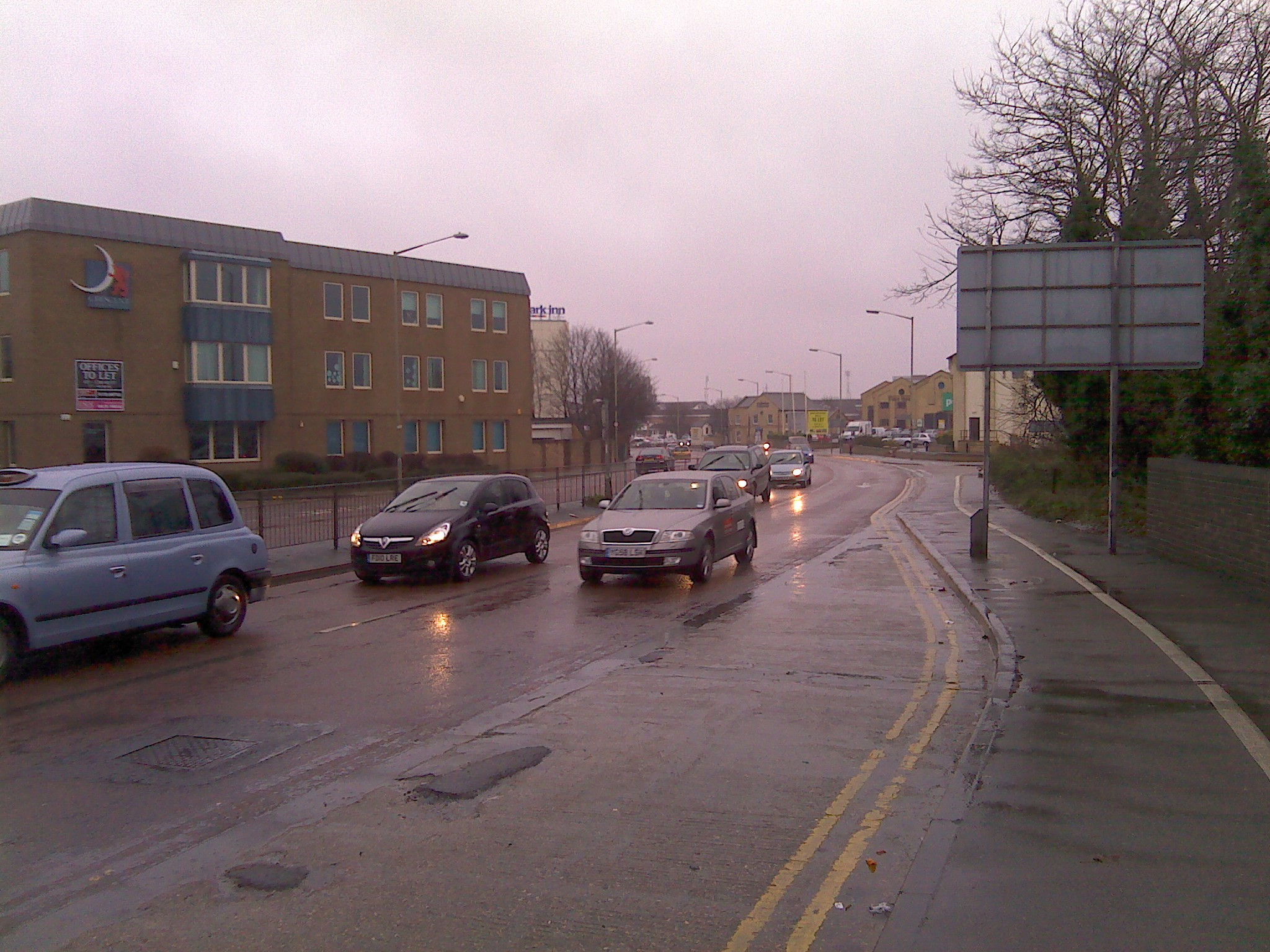
The A15 dual carriageway in the city centre.

The A15 is Peterborough's main connecting road from the south to the A1(M), joining near Stilton, at Norman Cross. It begins as London Road at junction 16 of the A1(M) with the B1043 (former A1) in Cambridgeshire and the district of North West Cambridgeshire. From here to Yaxley, it passes the Norman Cross Hotel and follows the City of Peterborough and Cambridgeshire boundary, where there is a junction with the B1091 (for Farcet).

It enters the City of Peterborough near Hampton Vale on the left and meets the A1260 The Serpentine, which leads to two much faster routes around Peterborough. Next is a roundabout for the Cygnet Park business park on the left, home of the new headquarters of News International. It enters Old Fletton near the headquarters of Hotpoint to the left. A staggered junction with the A1129 crosses the East Coast Main Line. It passes Peterborough United on the right in New Fletton. It meets the start of the A605 at a roundabout and crosses the River Nene.

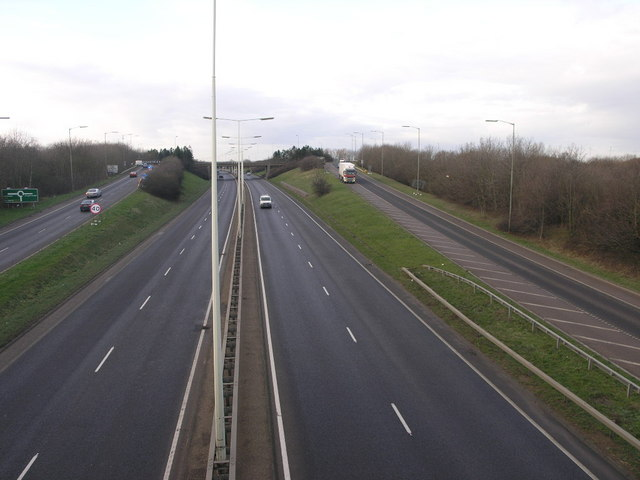
The A47 junction near Dogsthorpe

The A15 takes two routes through Peterborough:

- The route on the west side begins as Bourges Boulevard at Peterborough Combined Court Centre, meets the A1179 (former A47), passes the Peterborough railway station and meets three roundabouts near Millfield and New England. It follows the East Coast Main Line and becomes Lincoln Road and Werrington Parkway after the A47 GSJ. It passes four roundabouts, crossing the Peterborough to Lincoln Line.
- The route on the east side starts at the Eye roundabout with the A1139 at Newark, then follows the dual-carriageway Paston Parkway, which meets the A47. It continues as a dual-carriageway (opened in spring 2008) at the next roundabout at Gunthorpe. It follows the Car Dyke and then meets another roundabout at Werrington before becoming a single-carriageway and crossing the Spalding railway between Werrington and Glinton.

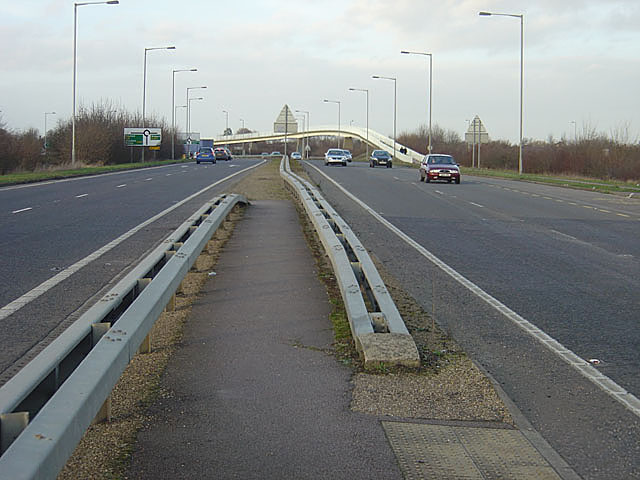
Approaching the Glinton bypass from the south

Both routes head through Werrington (passing either side) before joining again at Glinton with the roundabout with the B1443. There is another roundabout. with the B1443 (for Helpston). It passes Etton. It meets a roundabout with the B1524 (the former route through Market Deeping), B1162 (for Northborough to the right) and an exit for Maxey to the right.

=== Kesteven ===
Just south of the Welland Gate roundabout on the A1175 and B1166, it crosses the River Welland so entering South Kesteven in Lincolnshire. The roundabout marks the western end of the £7 million 4-mile (6.4 km) Market Deeping bypass, finished on Wednesday 15 July 1998; construction began on Thursday 20 March 1997. The official opening was at 11.40am on Wednesday 5 August 1998, built by John Mowlem.

The A15 and A1175 roads are now merged in a 1-mile (1.6 km) dual-carriageway stretch. It meets the B1524 (former route) at a roundabout and heads to the left as Peterborough Road Bourne Road and Deeping Road.

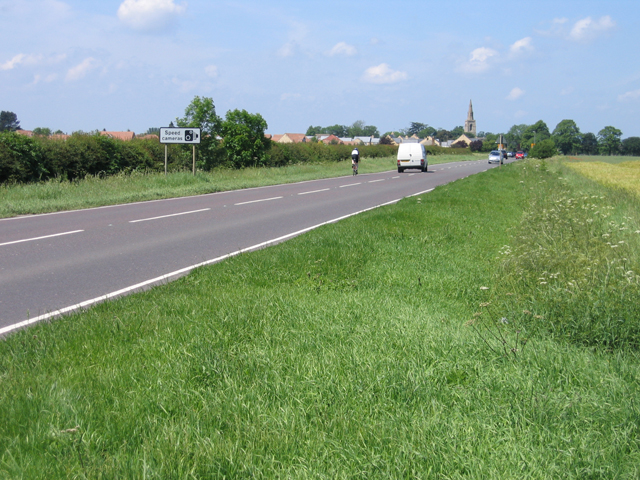
Entering Langtoft from the south

North of Baston is the Waterside Garden Centre close to where it meets the north-south Roman Road King Street, which it follows until just north of Bourne. It goes over the River Glen at the point it is crossed by the Macmillan Way, at Kate's Bridge.

There is a left turn for Obthorpe and it goes through Thurlby, passing the Horseshoe pub, then Northorpe, before coming to the small town of Bourne. It meets the recently diverted A151 at a new roundabout (the A151 leaves to the right 110 yards (100 m) further on), where the road becomes South Road. It passes Bourne Grammar School, then after some treacherous bends near Bourne Abbey becomes South Street, with the town's Heritage centre and war memorial gardens on the left by the Bourne Eau. At the crossroads in the centre of town it crosses the B1193 (original route of the A151) in the historic market place(52°46.0920′N 0°22.6320′W), where are located the Nags Head, Angel Hotel, Burghley Arms. As North Street, it passes the Burghley Centre (shops), and Bourne Bus Station. At the two miniature roundabouts, the name changes to North Road, which it keeps until it reaches Morton.

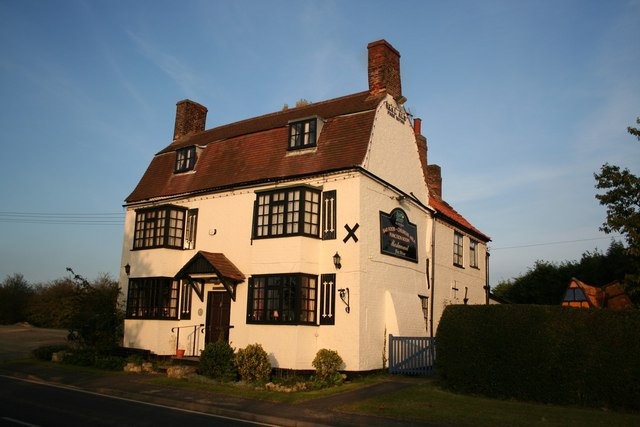
Robin Hood and Little John at Aslackby

Just outside Bourne, at 52.79975°N 0.41525°W, the route of (Roman) King Street heads off across the fields to Stainfield and Ancaster but the A15 continues north along the line of another Roman road, Mareham Lane. It passes close to Dyke, and goes through Morton as Bourne Road, passing the Lord Nelson pub. It becomes Folkingham Road, there is a right turn for Haconby and a junction with the B1177 (for Billingborough). Close by are Rippingale and Kirkby Underwood. Between Rippingale and Aslackby, a wooded lay-by known locally as 'Turnpike Bar' marks the deviation from the line of the Roman Road Mareham Lane52°50′45″N 0°23′22″W. The A15 passes by Aslackby and the Robin Hood and Little John, and then through the middle of Folkingham, with a sharp turn to the east at the top by the Greyhound.

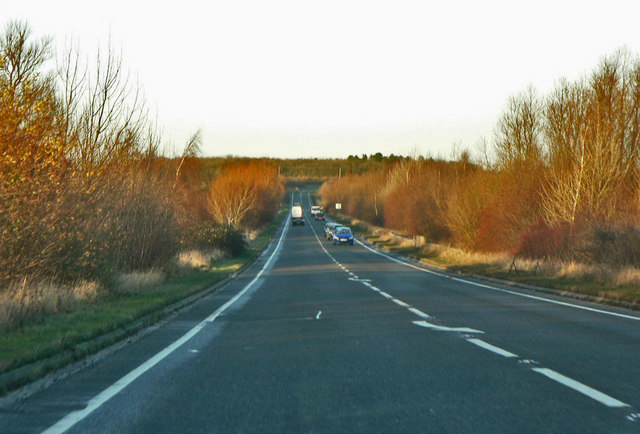
Sleaford Bypass looking north to Holdingham

There is the Threekingham Bar roundabout with the east-west A52, and it goes through Osbournby, as London Road past the primary school]. It passes the Tally Ho Inn near Aswarby, then there are left turns for Aunsby and Swarby. Sleaford and Silk Willoughby were on the A15, which slowed traffic down as the traffic went across a level crossing and through Sleaford's shopping area. The £5.7 million bypass was built by Morrison Shand, started in July 1992, to take 18 months, but was opened on Thursday 16 September 1993 by Douglas Hogg, where there is a roundabout with the A153 and B1517. The A15 crosses the railway and River Slea, and then leaves the bypass at the Holdingham Roundabout with the A17 and B1518 (former route).

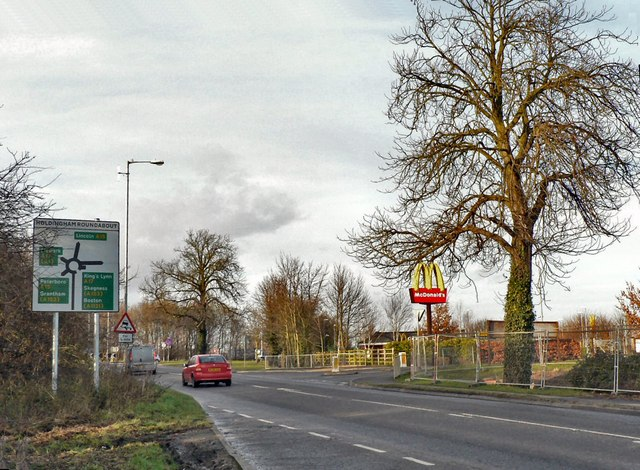
Approaching the Holdingham Roundabout from the former route

As Lincoln Road, it goes close to Leasingham meeting the B1209. There is a junction Cranwell with the B1429. It meets the B1191 (for Scopwick), B1202 (for Boothby Graffoe to the west and Metheringham to the east) next to the former RAF Coleby Grange, and B1178 (for Harmston), where it passes Dunston Pillar. At Nocton Heath, it passes the Kitchen cafe. On the route to Lincoln, it goes near to two RAF bases – RAF Digby, which is used for communications rather than as a flying station, and across the end of the runway of RAF Waddington, which flies AWACS and Nimrod aircraft. A parking place and cafe are provided for plane spotters on the eastern side of the road.

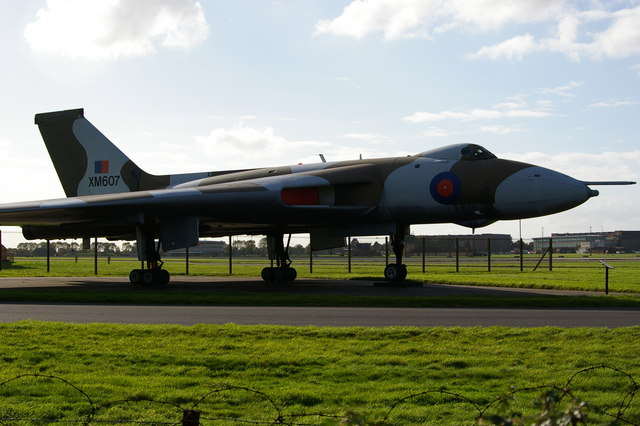
Vulcan XM607 by the side of the A15 at RAF Waddington which took part in Operation Black Buck

Next to the runway at Waddington is an old Vulcan, carrying the number of the plane that bombed Port Stanley.

South of Bracebridge Heath, the A15 heads east around the city using the A15 Lincoln Eastern Bypass, a 4.7 miles (7.5 km) single carriageway opened on 19 December 2020. The route is designed to allow for easy widening to a dual carriageway if necessary in the future. The bypass has three roundabouts, two bridges, and one underpass before reaching the River Witham. The road crosses over the river on a viaduct before entering Lincoln for a short distance before entering Lindsey.

=== Lindsey ===
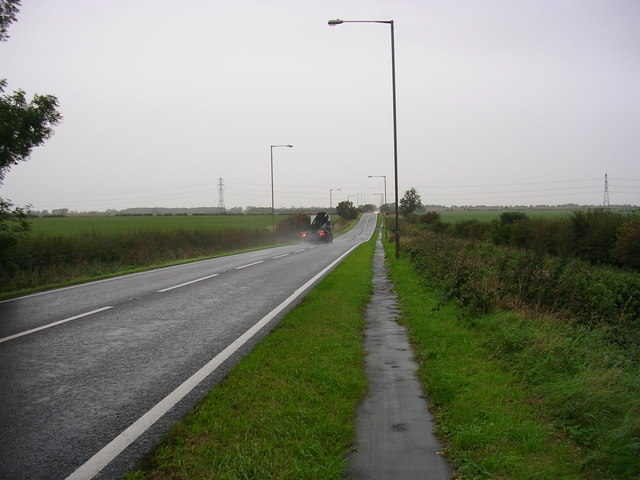
North of Lincoln near Riseholme

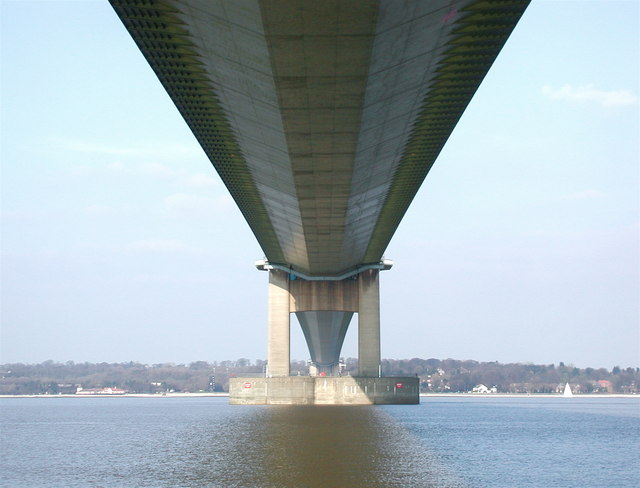
The Humber Bridge looking north

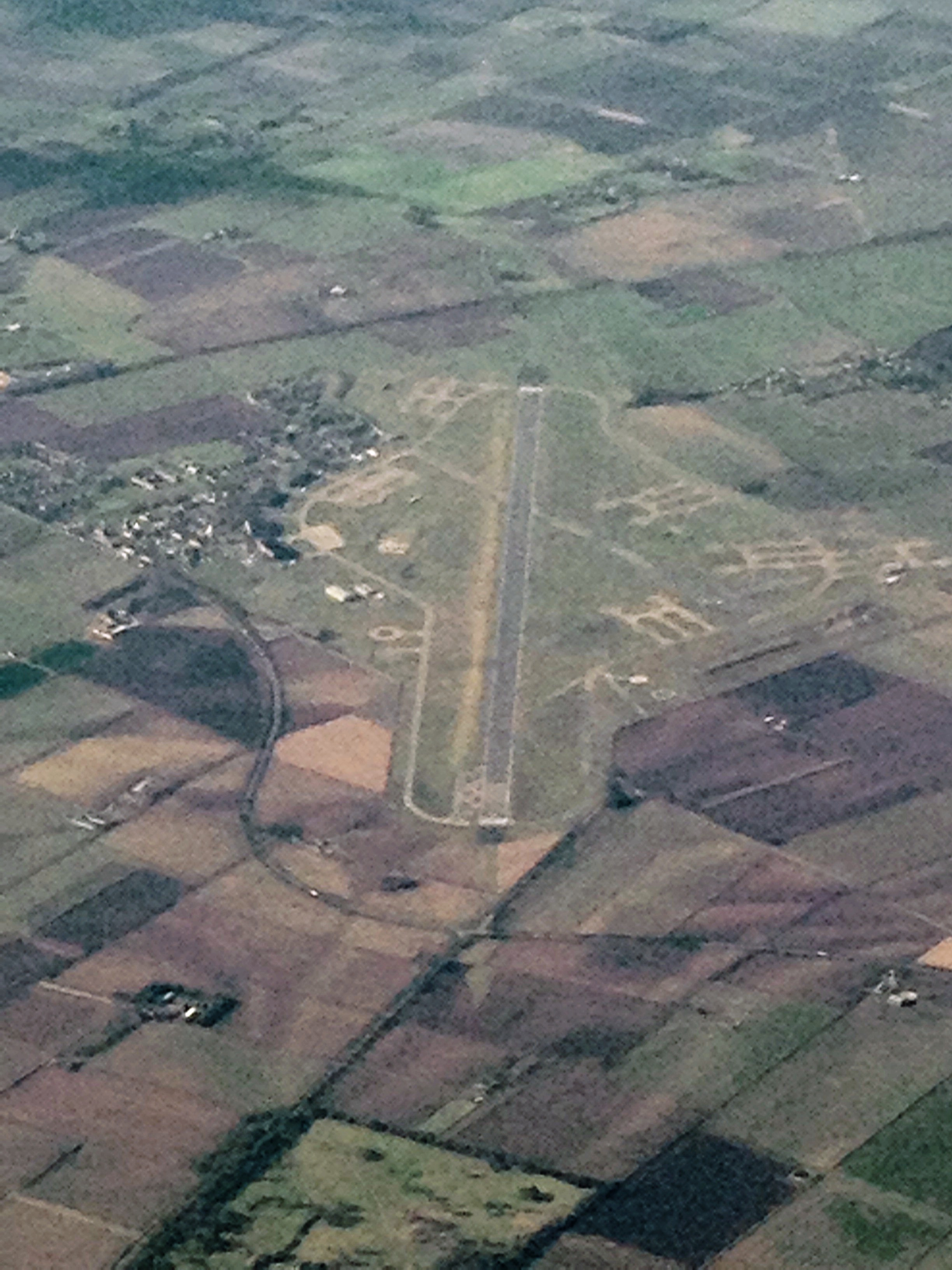
The A15 at its 1950s curvature east of Ermine Street around RAF Scampton, seen in March 2016

The bypass continues north, entering West Lindsey, before meeting the Greetwell Road roundabout and then terminating at the Wragby Road roundabout. The A15 then runs unbroken northwestwards to the Riseholme roundabout, where it briefly re-enters the City of Lincoln, then follows the Roman road Ermine Street past the Riseholme College of Agriculture on the right, now part of the University of Lincoln, and Lincolnshire Showground to the left. At the end of a 40 miles per hour (64 km/h) section is the Tillbridge Lane roundabout with the A1500, for Gainsborough. From here, it used to be straight, but with RAF Scampton becoming a base for Avro Vulcan V bombers in the 1950s, the runway had to be extended, and the road now has a curved diversion to the east. The 2.5 mi (4.0 km) Scampton diversion began on 20 June 1956, to be finished in early 1957; construction was started by Councillor W. H. Mackinder of Lindsey County Council; the diversion was opened at noon on Monday 28 January 1957, being built by Laing. The formerly straight line still forms the border of many strip parishes in the area, such as between Scampton and Welton, whose borders were first put in place based on Ermine Street. It passes the Scampton primary school and continues past a right turn to Normanby by Spital, on its most straight section, also the parish boundary of many local villages. At the roundabout with the A631 at Caenby Corner, there is the Total Caenby Corner Garage just south of Spital-in-the-Street. Overtaking is difficult as the road, although straight, is undulating with unmarked dips and slow-moving farm traffic. There are two right turns for Bishop Norton and Atterby. There is a right turn for Snitterby and a left turn for Blyborough. At the B1205 staggered crossroads (for Waddingham to the east, and Grayingham to the west), it enters North Lincolnshire.

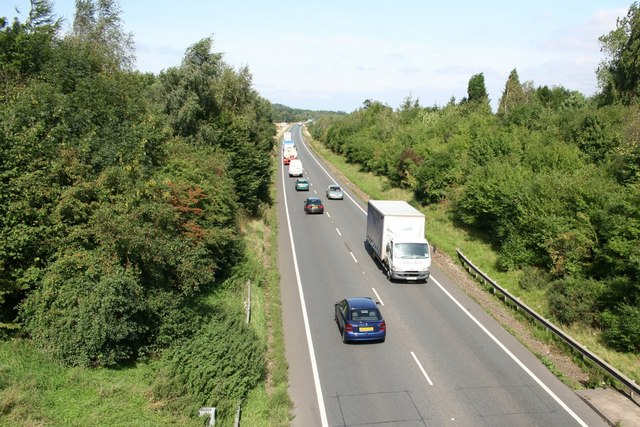
Looking north near Scawby

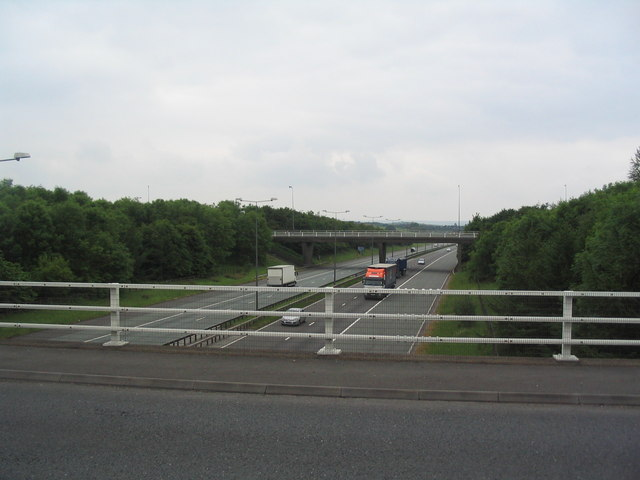
A15/M180/A180 Barnetby Top Interchange

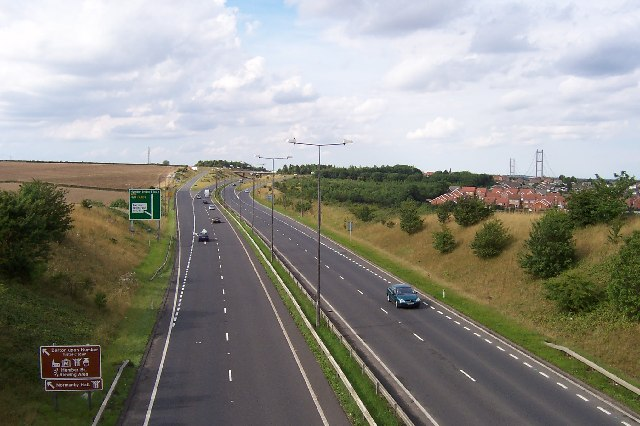
Looking north to the A1077 intersection

At the B1206 crossroads, the old route used to go through Hibaldstow and Brigg, with the former road to Redbourne now a cycle route. It passes close to Kirton in Lindsey, home of RAF Kirton in Lindsey much used in the Second World War as a fighter airfield in 12 Group, now home to the Trent Valley Gliding Club. Hibaldstow was a wartime fighter airfield as well, and this is now used as a base for parachuting and parachuting competitions by Target Skysports. The 5-mile (8.0 km) £7 million Brigg and Redbourne bypass was added in December 1989 which follows the old Ermine Street in North Lincolnshire further than previously, with a much flatter, wider and safer road. This section was the upgraded route of an unclassified road. It crosses the Sheffield to Cleethorpes railway line near the deserted village of Gainsthorpe, passes near to Scawby, and joining the M180 at junction 4, near Scunthorpe. It abandons the Roman alignments at a short spur to the A18 at the Briggate Lodge Roundabout next to the Forest Pines golf club and hotel at Broughton. Ermine Street continues north as the B1207, meeting the Humber near Winteringham.

The route of the A15 now becomes part of the three-laned M180, which was opened on 2 September 1977. The A15 section along Ermine Street was planned to be opened simultaneously, but it had to wait twelve years. Traffic buildup to Grimsby prompted calls for the Brigg bypass for many years, but the Flixborough explosion of 1974 made it more of an emergency. This section goes under the A18, over the River Ancholme, over the old route of the A15 (B1206), and over the South TransPennine railway. At junction 5, the A15 reforms at the dual-grade Barnetby Top Interchange, which is crossed by the Viking Way and has an exit to Elsham. It continues north as a dual carriageway, which carries about as little traffic as the M180. The M180 drops to two lanes under this roundabout and continues to Grimsby and Immingham as the A180.

The A15 towards the Humber Bridge, goes directly across the runways of the former RAF Bomber Command airfield at RAF Elsham Wolds (where over 1,000 of its aircrew were killed), which is now the Elsham Wolds Industrial Estate. The former route of the A15, pre-1978, is now called B1206, and ends at New Holland, where the A15 formerly connected with the Humber Ferry. The £5.6 million 6-mile (9.7 km) Brigg Bypass to Barton-upon-Humber Bypass (up to where the B1218 crosses) section opened in June 1978.

The £2 million 1-mile (1.6 km) Barton-upon-Humber Bypass to Humber Bridge (A1077 interchange) section opened in September 1978, although some maps show this being open before the southern section to the M180. When this section opened to the GSJ with the A1077 (for South Ferriby) in 1978, there was no longer any access to the B1218. In the early 1990s, a new interchange was added with the B1206 (the former A15), which is crossed by the Viking Way, which follows the road for over a mile. The section across the Humber was opened on 17 July 1981, by the Queen, and was the world's longest single-span bridge until 1997. The tolls are north of the bridge. It crosses the A63 and meets a roundabout with A164 (for Beverley) and A1105, then turns left along a short section of dual-carriageway (former A63) to end at the A63.

== Junction list ==
County	Location	mi	km	Destinations	Notes
Cambridgeshire	Folksworth and Washingley– Yaxley boundary	0.0	0.0	A1(M) – The North, London, Huntingdon, Peterborough; B1043 / Folksworth Road to B660 – Stilton, Folksworth, Morborne, Denton, Holme, Ramsey, Glatton	Southern terminus; continues as B1043 beyond A1(M); A1(M) junction 16
Cambridgeshire	Peterborough	3.2	5.1	The Serpentine (A1260 north-west) to A1 / A47 / A605 – City centre	City centre signed northbound only; south-eastern terminus of A1260
Cambridgeshire	Peterborough	4.5	7.2	High Street (A1129 east) / Celta Road – Fletton	Fletton signed northbound only; western terminus of A1129
Cambridgeshire	Peterborough	5.1	8.2	A605 east (Fletton Avenue) – Whittlesey, Farcet, Stanground, Fletton	Only Whittlesey signed northbound; southern terminus of A605 concurrency
Cambridgeshire	Peterborough	5.3	8.5	Oundle Road (A605 west) / Hawskbill Way	Northern terminus of A605 concurrency
Cambridgeshire	Peterborough	6.0	9.7	Thorpe Road (A1179 west) to A1 / A1(M) – London, The North	Information signed northbound only; eastern terminus of A1179
Cambridgeshire	Peterborough	7.9	12.7	A47 / Soke Parkway to A15 / A605 / A1 – Leicester, Wisbech, Sleaford, Northampton, The North, London	To A15 and Sleaford signed northbound only, To A605, A1, Northampton, The North, and London southbound only; A47 west junction 18; access to A47 west and from A47 east via Soke Parkway
Cambridgeshire	Glinton, Cambridgeshire	10.7	17.2	A15 south to Lincoln Road (B1443) / A47 – Wisbech, Glinton, Cambridgeshire, Peakirk, Peterborough	Peakirk signed northbound only, A15 and Peterborough southbound only
Lincolnshire	Market Deeping	14.4	23.2	A1175 south-west / B1525 (Stamford Road) to B1166 – Stamford, Market Deeping, West Deeping, Tallington, Deeping St James, Crowland	Southern terminus of A1175 concurrency
Lincolnshire	Market Deeping	15.4	24.8	A1175 north-east / B1524 (Peterborough Road) to A16 – Spalding, Boston, Market Deeping	To A16 signed southbound only; northern terminus of A1175 concurrency
Lincolnshire	Bourne	20.6	33.2	A151 west (Raymond Mays Way) to A1 / A6121 / B1176 – Grantham, Stamford	Southern terminus of A151 concurrency
Lincolnshire	Bourne	21.0	33.8	A151 east (Cherry Holt Road) – Spalding	Northern terminus of A151 concurrency
Lincolnshire		32.6	52.5	A52 to A16 – Grantham, Boston, Spalding	
Lincolnshire	Sleaford	38.2	61.5	A153 south-west / B1517 (Grantham Road) – Grantham, Sleaford, South Rauceby, North Rauceby, Wilsford, Ancaster, Quarrington	North-eastern terminus of A153
Lincolnshire	Sleaford	39.9	64.2	A17 / B1518 (Lincoln Road) to A1 – Newark, King's Lynn, Skegness, Sleaford, Boston	Boston signed northbound only
Lincolnshire	Bracebridge Heath	52.8	85.0	A607 (Sleaford Road) – Lincoln, Grantham, Bracebridge Heath, RAF Waddington	
Lincolnshire	Greetwell– Nettleham boundary	57.5	92.5	A158 east (Wragby Road East) / A1434 south-west (Bunkers Hill) to A157 – Skegness, Lincoln, Wragby, North Greetwell	To A157 signed southbound only; western terminus of A158; north-eastern terminus of A1434
Lincolnshire	Nettleham	58.5	94.1	A46 north-east / Lincoln Road – Grimsby, Lincoln, Nettleham, Market Rasen	Southern terminus of A46 concurrency
Lincolnshire	Lincoln boundary	59.6	95.9	A46 south-west / B1226 (Riseholm Road) to A57 / A156 / A1 – Lincoln, Newark, Worksop, Gainsborough, Grantham	Only A46 and Lincoln signed southbound; northern terminus of A46 concurrency
Lincolnshire	North Carlton– Scampton boundary	62.1	99.9	A1500 west / Horncastle Lane to A156 – Gainsborough, Scampton, Sturton, Marton, Dunholme	To A156 signed southbound only; eastern terminus of A1500
Lincolnshire	Caenby Corner	69.5	111.8	A631 to A46 – Grimsby, Gainsborough, Market Rasen, Caistor, Cleethorpes, Hemswell Cliff, Glentworth, Hemswell, Corringham	Cleethorpes and Glentworth signed northbound only
Lincolnshire	Broughton– Scawby boundary	80.0	128.7	M180 west / A18 to M18 / M181 – Scunthorpe, Doncaster, Brigg	To M18, M181, and Brigg signed northbound only; southern terminus of M180 concurrency; M180 junction 4
Lincolnshire	Elsham	86.7	139.5	A180 east / A18 to Barnetby Top / A160 – Grimsby, Immingham, Brigg, Elsham	Northern terminus of M180 concurrency; eastern terminus of M180; western terminus of A180; M180 junction 5
Lincolnshire	Elsham	88.1– 88.4	141.8– 142.3	Elsham Wold industrial area	Grade-separated junction
Lincolnshire	Thornton Curtis– Bonby boundary	90.5	145.6	B1206 – Barrow, New Holland	Grade-separated junction
Lincolnshire	Barton-upon-Humber	93.3– 94.3	150.2– 151.8	A1077 – Barton, Winterton	
Lincolnshire–East Yorkshire county boundary	Barton-upon-Humber; Hessle boundary	94.6– 96.2	152.2– 154.8	Humber Bridge (toll) over Humber	
East Yorkshire	Hessle	96.9	155.9	A164 north / A1105 east to A1079 – Beverley, York, Hessle	Southern terminus of A164; western terminus of A1105
East Yorkshire	North Ferriby	97.2– 97.7	156.4– 157.2	A63 / Ferriby Road to M62 – Hull, Goole, Leeds, Hessle	Northern terminus
1.000 mi = 1.609 km; 1.000 km = 0.621 mi: Concurrency terminus

== Improvements ==
Holdingham Roundabout (A15 – A17) will be signalised in Spring 2021.

== See also ==
- Ermine Street
