= Habrough =

Village and civil parish in North East Lincolnshire, England

Coordinates: 53.607890°N 0.264914°W

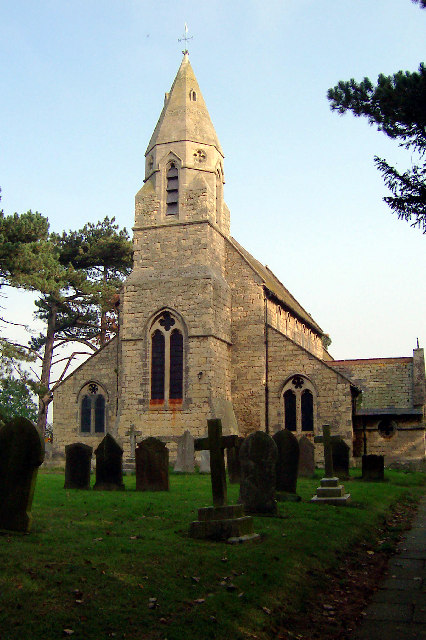
- St Margaret's Church, Habrough

- Location within Lincolnshire
- Population: 631 (2011)
- OS grid reference: TA148137
  - London: 145 mi (233 km) S
- Unitary authority: North East Lincolnshire
- Ceremonial county: Lincolnshire
- Region: Yorkshire and the Humber
- Country: England
- Sovereign state: United Kingdom
- Post town: Immingham
- Postcode district: DN40
- Dialling code: 01469
- Police: Humberside
- Fire: Humberside
- Ambulance: East Midlands
- UK Parliament: Brigg and Immingham

Habrough (/ˈheɪb(ə)rə/ HAY-b(ə-)rə) is a village and civil parish in North East Lincolnshire, England, 8 miles (13 km) north-west of Grimsby and 3 miles (5 km) inland from the Humber estuary at the southern edge of the A180 road, just west of Immingham and south of South Killingholme. Humberside Airport is 4 miles (6.4 km) to the south-west.

The parish has an area of 2,330 acres (9 km^{2}).

== History ==
Habrough is listed in the 1086 Domesday Book, with 28 households, a mill and a saltern. There was a manor house here, of which only earthworks remain south east from the church. It belonged during the 13th and 14th centuries to the de Saltfletby family, and later the Skipwith family. The manor was reputedly abandoned when the Skipwith line died out. Today the village has land owned by the Earl of Yarborough and is situated less than 1 mile (1.6 km) away from the Brocklesby House Estate of the Earl of Yarborough.

The name Habrough is found in old records as "Haburgh".

== Community ==
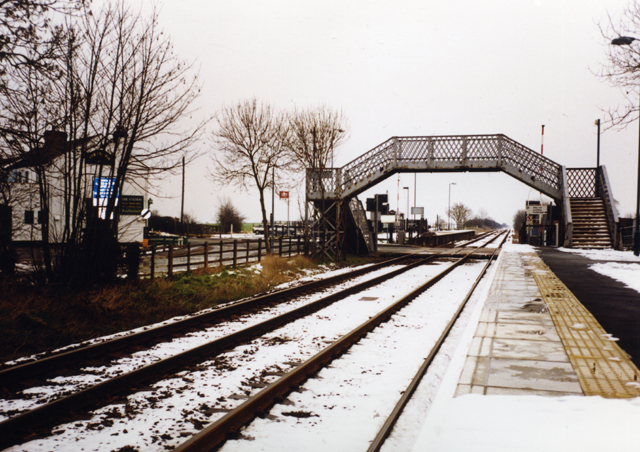
Habrough railway station

The Anglican parish church is dedicated to St Margaret. The church tower was restored in 1684, and the church rebuilt in limestone in 1869, by R. J. Withers. It is a Grade II listed building.

The Wesleyan Methodist Church had a chapel here, rebuilt in 1869. The Primitive Methodist also had a chapel, rebuilt in 1873.

Habrough railway station serves the village and the town of Immingham. The village is on the railway line established in the 19th century by the Great Central Railway.
