= A18 motorway (Belgium) =

Motorway in Belgium

A18
- Dutch: Autosnelweg 18; French: Autoroute 18

Route information
- Part of E40

Major junctions
- West end: A 16 at French border near Dunkirk
- 1 Adinkerke N34 / N39 1a Veurne N8 / N390; 2 Oostduinkerke N330; 3 Nieuwpoort N39 / N355 / N356; 4 Middelkerke N369 5 Gistel N33
- East end: 6 Jabbeke A10 near Bruges

Location
- Country: Belgium
- Major cities: Nieuwpoort

Highway system
- Highways of Belgium; Motorways; National Roads

The A18 is a motorway in north west Belgium stretching from the French border near Dunkirk to the A10 motorway between Ostend and Bruges.
