= Thornton Curtis =

Village and civil parish in the North Lincolnshire district of Lincolnshire, England

Coordinates: 53.646452°N 0.356438°W

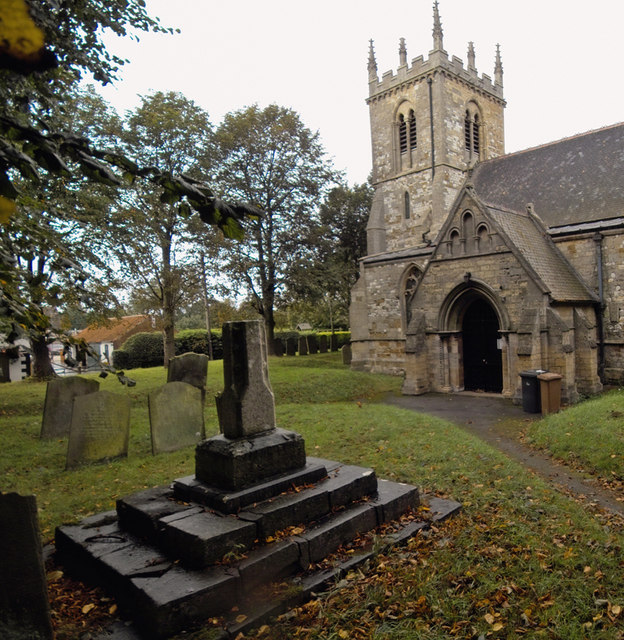
- Church of St Lawrence, Thornton Curtis

- Location within Lincolnshire
- Population: 295 (2011)
- OS grid reference: TA087179
  - London: 155 mi (249 km) S
- Unitary authority: North Lincolnshire
- Ceremonial county: Lincolnshire
- Region: East Midlands
- Country: England
- Sovereign state: United Kingdom
- Post town: ULCEBY
- Postcode district: DN39
- Police: Lincolnshire
- Fire: Lincolnshire
- Ambulance: East Midlands
- UK Parliament: Brigg and Immingham

Thornton Curtis is a village and civil parish in the North Lincolnshire district of Lincolnshire, England, approximately 5 miles (8 km) south-east from the town of Barton-upon-Humber. The population (including Burnham) at the 2011 census was 295.

The name Thornton is from the Old English thorn+tun, meaning "village where thorn trees grow." In the 1086 Domesday Book the name is written as "Torentune". The origin of the Curtis part of the village name is unknown.

The village is served by Thornton Abbey railway station.

== Notable buildings ==
Nearby is the 12th-century Thornton Abbey and the Grade I listed Abbots Lodge, a country house built on the monastic ruins for the MP Sir Vincent Skinner.

The parish church is a Grade I listed building dedicated to Saint Lawrence and dating from the 12th century. It consists of a 13th-century chancel, a nave, aisles, south porch and an embattled 13th-century western tower with eight pinnacles and containing six bells. The church was restored 1884 by James Fowler of Louth which included rebuilding the south porch, and new nave and chancel roofs. There is a 12th-century square black Tournai marble font, with opposed pairs of carved animals to sides, standing on a cylindrical column with shafts to each corner on a square base.

Thornton Hall is a Grade II* listed country house built between 1695 and 1700 by Sir Rowland Wynne.

There is one public house in the village, the Thornton Hunt, which dates from the 18th century and is Grade II listed.

Thornton Village

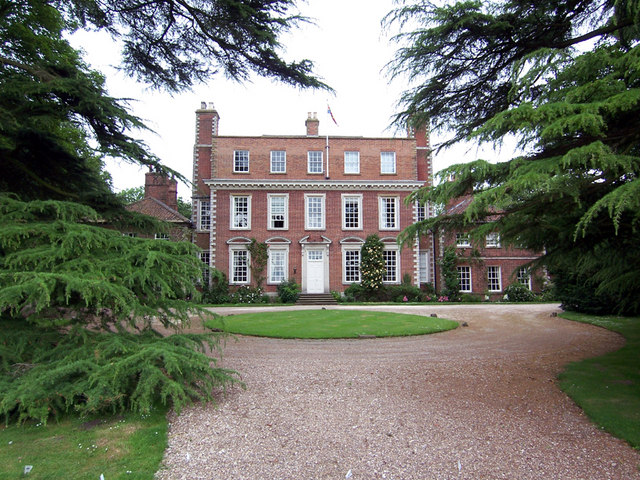
Thornton Hall

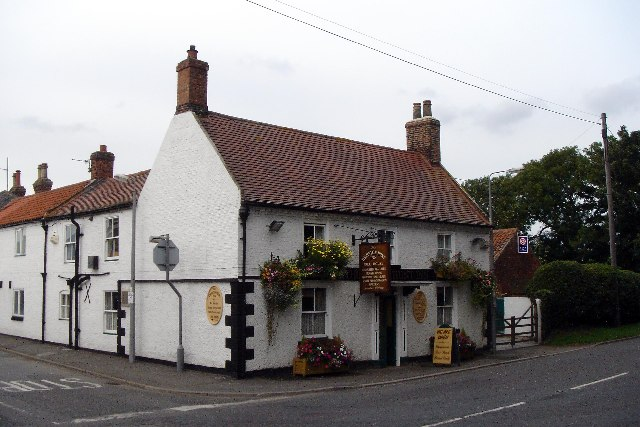
Thornton Hunt Inn

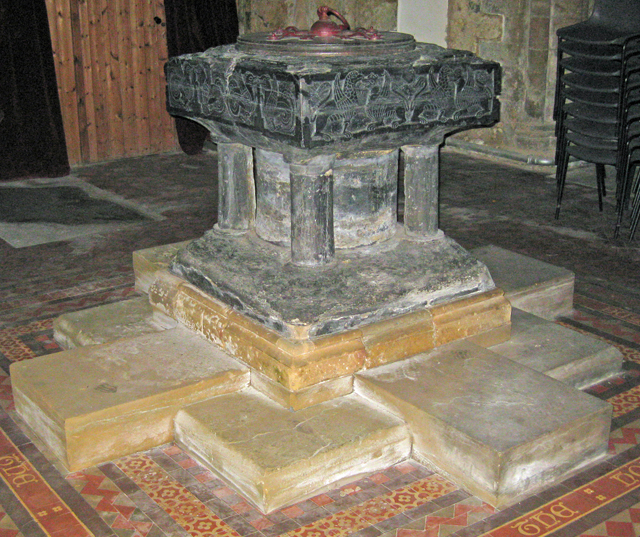
The Tournai font, St Lawrence's Church

== Historical and latest population/demographic details ==
The population of Thornton Curtis remained relatively stable for the 110 years from 1850 to 1960; since 1960 a marked decline can be seen.

Year	Population
1801	242
1811	300
1821	328
1831	362
1841	393
1851	497
1861	483
1871	478
1881	491
1891	489
1901	477
1911	452
1921	481
1931	467
1941	N/A
1951	422
1961	403
1971	336
1981	308
1991	279
2001	246
2011	295

Information from the United Kingdom Census 2001:

- Number of households in the parish: 116 (50% detached houses or bungalows).
- Of the 246 residents, 117 were male and 129 female.
- Over 50% of residents fell into the 30- to 59-year-old age categories.
- Ethnicity: 97.6% British White.
- Unemployment Rate: 2.48%.
- Household Owner/Occupier (either outright or with mortgage): 64.1%.
- Car ownership by household (at least one car per household): 88.7%.
- 33.2% of the residents held no formal qualifications.
- 8.4% of residents held Degree level or equivalent qualifications.
