= M181 motorway =

Motorway in the United Kingdom

M181
- M181 highlighted in blue

Route information
- Maintained by North Lincolnshire Council
- Length: 0.7 mi (1,100 m)
- Existed: 1978–present

Major junctions
- South end: East Butterwick
- M180 motorway A1077(M) motorway
- North end: Scunthorpe

Location
- Country: United Kingdom

Road network
- Roads in the United Kingdom; Motorways; A and B road zones
← M180	→ M271

The M181 is a motorway that links the town of Scunthorpe, England, to the M180 motorway. A spur of the M180, the road is virtually straight through its entire 0.7-mile (1.1 km) length. It was opened in December 1978, at the same time as the section of M180 from junction 3 (A15) to the east side of the River Trent (the bridge was not opened until late 1979).

== Route ==
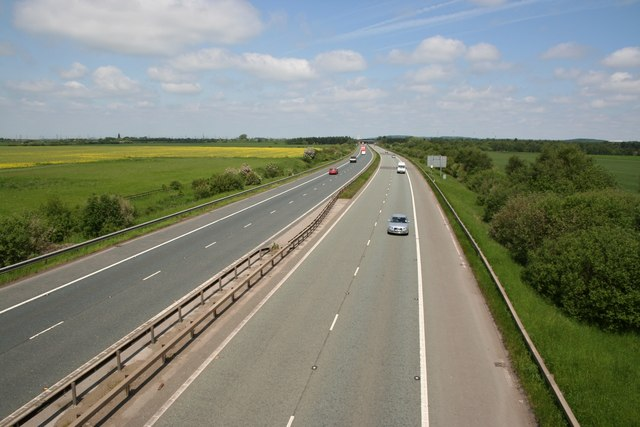
A former, now non-motorway section of the M181, looking north from Brumby Common Lane bridge

It begins just outside Scunthorpe, at the junction of the A1077 and A18. There is an out-of-town retail park, known locally as Gallagher Retail Park, which offers a variety of food and retail outlets, and Glanford Park, the home of Scunthorpe United Football Club at this junction. At the other end, the road has a junction for the M180 east, while the main carriageway merges with the M180 west. It has no intermediate junctions. It is built to typical British motorway standards, being two lanes in each direction, plus a hard shoulder for its entire length.

In January 2019, as part of the Lincolnshire Lakes development, North Lincolnshire Council gave the green light for construction of a new roundabout junction along the M181 with the B1450 Burringham Road which would form the terminus of the motorway. Work began on this new junction in June 2020. Further plans have seen a new roundabout constructed at the southern end of the motorway at which point the M181 will lose its motorway status, with the northern section becoming the A1077 (temporarily A1077(M)) and the southern section becoming the M180 access slips to junction 3.

== Junctions ==
County	Location	mi	km	Junction	Destinations	Notes
Lincolnshire	Scunthorpe	0	0	— (Note: 53.556°N 0.710°W)	M180 - Doncaster, Grimsby	
Lincolnshire	Scunthorpe	0.7	1.1	— (Note: 53.566°N 0.705°W)	A1077(M) - Scunthorpe	
1.000 mi = 1.609 km; 1.000 km = 0.621 mi

*Ceremonial Counties

Coordinate list

== See also ==
- List of motorways in the United Kingdom
