= Ulceby, North Lincolnshire =

Village and civil parish in North Lincolnshire, England

Coordinates: 53.618265°N 0.32451°W

Ulceby
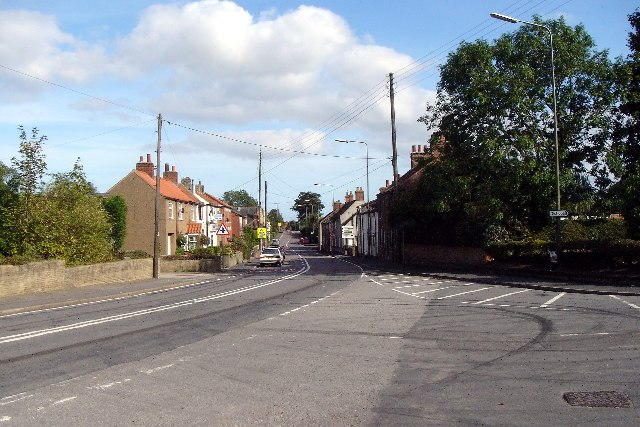
- Ulceby village

- Location within Lincolnshire
- Population: 1,711 (2011)
- OS grid reference: TA109148
  - London: 155 mi (249 km) S
- Unitary authority: North Lincolnshire
- Ceremonial county: Lincolnshire
- Region: Yorkshire and the Humber
- Country: England
- Sovereign state: United Kingdom
- Post town: ULCEBY
- Postcode district: DN39
- Dialling code: 01469
- Police: Humberside
- Fire: Humberside
- Ambulance: East Midlands
- UK Parliament: Brigg and Immingham

Ulceby is a village and civil parish in North Lincolnshire, England. It is situated 0.5 miles (0.8 km) north from the A180 road, 10 miles (16 km) north-west from Grimsby and 14 miles (23 km) east from Scunthorpe. Ulceby is a rural village surrounded by fields, farms and the nearby villages of Habrough, Wootton and Croxton.

The first part of the name is an Old Norse name (Úlfr), and the by means farmstead.

At the 2001 census the village had a population of 1,500 in 631 households, and at the 2011 census the village had grown to 1,711.

== Facilities ==
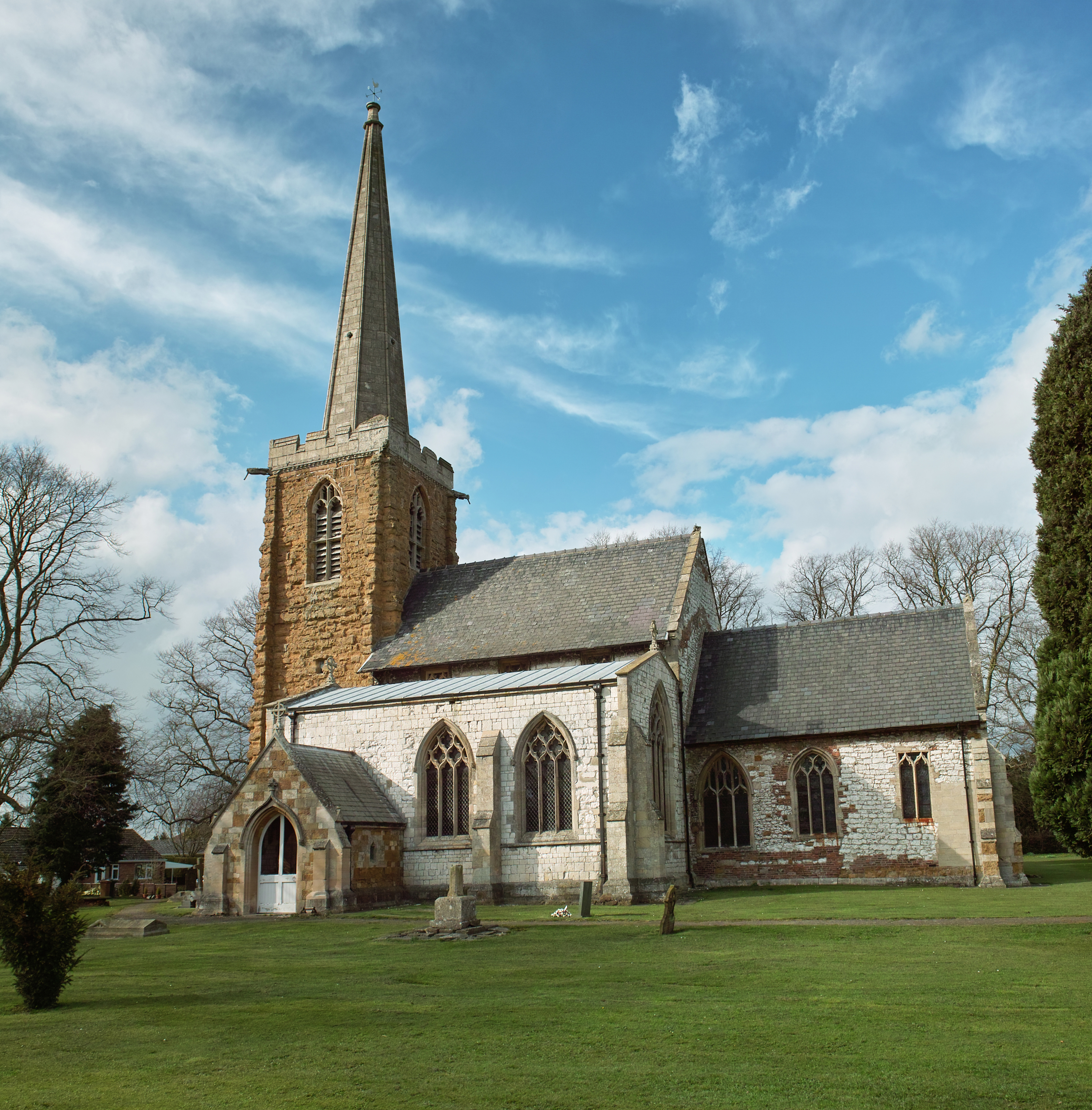
Church of St Nicholas

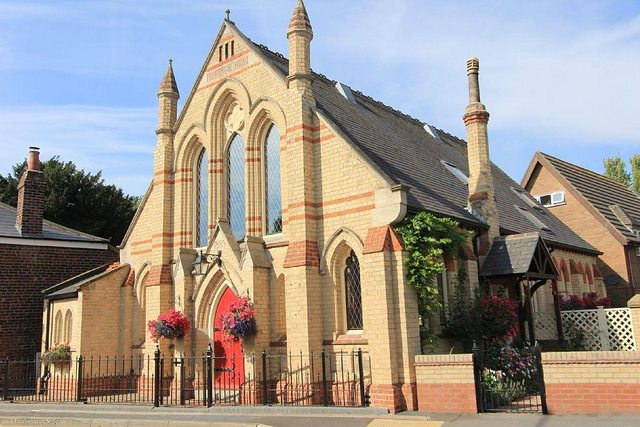
Ulceby Primitive Methodist Chapel was converted after being privately purchased in 2011. It is now known as "The Chapel" but the inscription "Primitive Methodist Chapel" is still visible at the top of the building's front.

Village facilities include a Co-op convenience store and Post Office, village hall and community centre, a playing field, play area, veterinary centre, hairdressers and a guest house. There are fast food outlets: a fish and chip shop and a Chinese takeaway. Ulceby public houses are The Fox Inn, and the Yarborough Arms located 1 mile (1.6 km) from the centre of the village; a previous public house, The Brocklesby Ox, is now the site of the aforementioned convenience store. The village has a preschool and primary St Nicholas C of E Primary School.

Ulceby railway station, at Ulceby Skitter, is situated 1 mile, and Ulceby Truck Stop (an HGV park with cafe and petrol station) 2 miles (3 km) from the centre of village.

Religious sites and landmarks are the Anglican church of St Nicholas, Ulceby Seventh-day Adventist Chapel, and a war memorial; Ulceby Methodist Chapel closed in June 2011, and is now a house.

== Notable people ==
- Vivian Hollowday – George Cross recipient
