= Gunness =

Village and civil parish in North Lincolnshire, England

Coordinates: 53.593620°N 0.727643°W

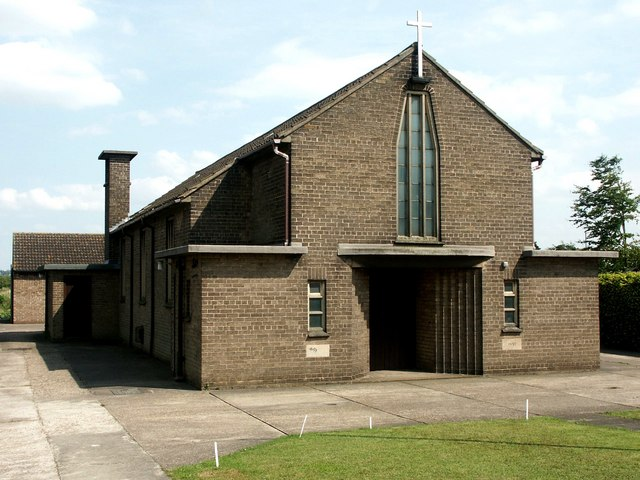
- Church of St Barnabas, Gunness

- Location within Lincolnshire
- Population: 2,462 (2011)
- OS grid reference: SE843115
  - London: 145 mi (233 km) S
- Unitary authority: North Lincolnshire
- Ceremonial county: Lincolnshire
- Region: Yorkshire and the Humber
- Country: England
- Sovereign state: United Kingdom
- Post town: Scunthorpe
- Postcode district: DN15
- Police: Humberside
- Fire: Humberside
- Ambulance: East Midlands
- UK Parliament: Scunthorpe

Gunness (or Gunhouse) is a village and civil parish in North Lincolnshire, England, on the east bank of the River Trent, 3 miles (5 km) west of Scunthorpe. The population of the civil parish at the 2011 census was 2,462.

On the Doncaster Road is the Grade II listed Rectory and Stable Block, built by James Fowler of Louth in 1864–66.

== History ==
In 1933 Kelly's Directory noted Gunness as:

a township and small village ... deriving its name from forming a ness or promontory in the River Trent. It has a station, for goods only, about half a mile distant on the South Yorkshire branch of the London and North Eastern railway, and is three-quarters of a mile from Althorpe station and 3½ miles west from Scunthorpe on the same railway, 18 miles north from Gainsborough and 175 from London.

It was formerly a chapelry in the parish of West Halton, but together with Burringham was formed into an ecclesiastical parish 15 Oct. 1861, from the ecclesiastical parishes of Bottesford, Frodingham and Crosby, and is in the Brigg division of the county, parts of Lindsey, north division of Manley wapentake, rural district of Glanford Brigg, county court district of Brigg, petty sessional division of Scunthorpe, rural deanery of Manlake, archdeaconry of Stow and diocese of Lincoln.

The King George V Bridge, opened for railway and highway traffic 21 May 1916, crosses the Trent from Althorpe station to Gunness; it is a steel structure built by Sir William Arrol and Co. Ltd. and has a lifting span weighing 3,600 tons and 165 feet long, operated by two electric motors of 115 h.p. each: the estimated cost was £750,000.

The church of St Barnabas is a small and plain edifice of brick in cement, in the Pointed style, consisting of chancel, nave, south porch and a belfry containing one bell: it was restored in 1902 and affords 60 sittings. The register dates from the year 1851. The living is a rectory, with Burringham annexed, joint net yearly value £540, with residence, built in 1866, in the gift of the Bishop of London, and held since 1931 by the Rev. William Hubert Britton M.A. of Selwyn College, Cambridge. The Methodist chapel here was built in 1928, and another, in Gunhouse lane, in 1883.

Here is a wharf and jetty for the shipment of iron ore, which is brought by rail from Frodingham, and at Neap is a staithe, or landing place, on the river Trent, for farm produce. Henry Wall esq. who is lord of the manor, and John Housham esq. are the principal landowners, but there are many small owners. The soil is alluvial; subsoil, warp. The chief crops are wheat, clover, oats and potatoes.

The area of the ecclesiastical parish is 2,808 acres, of the township 491 acres of land, 62 of tidal water and 18 of foreshore; the population in 1921 was 102 in the township and in the ecclesiastical parish of Gunness-cum-Burringham, 1,077 (which includes parts of Brumby (Rural) and Flixborough civil parishes).

== Transport ==
The nearest railway station is at Althorpe.
