= A160 road =

Road in North Lincolnshire, England

Coordinates: 53.6289°N 0.2573°W

A160

Route information
- Length: 3.2 mi (5.1 km)

Major junctions
- North end: Immingham
- A180 A1173
- South end: A180

Location
- Country: United Kingdom

Road network
- Roads in the United Kingdom; Motorways; A and B road zones

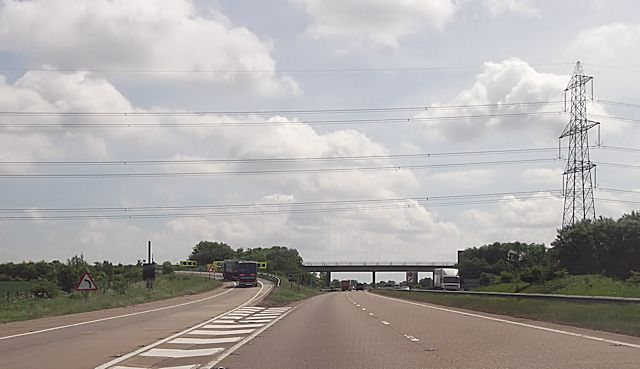
Start of the A160 seen from the A180

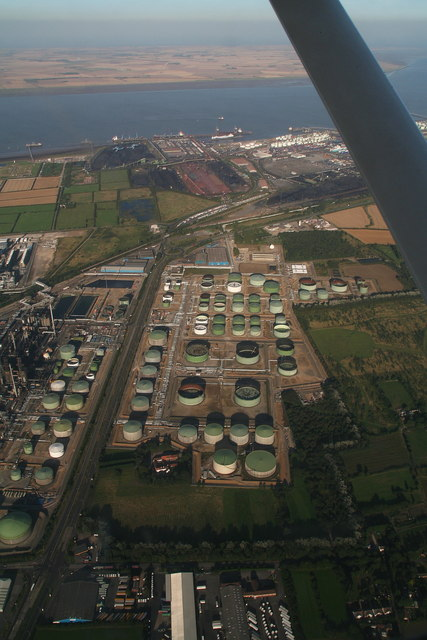
Aerial view of Humber Refinery and Immingham docks The A160 can be seen up the right hand side

The A160 is a short road in North Lincolnshire, England. It connects the A180 to Immingham docks. It is a dual carriageway for part of its length through the village of South Killingholme. Plans have been approved to entirely dual the road, and work started in spring 2015.

It forms the easternmost portion of European route E22 within Britain.

== Route ==
The A160 starts at a grade separated junction at Rye Hill on the A180 at TA136144. No other road shares this junction.

From the A180 the road is single carriageway to a roundabout on the edge of South Killingholme at TA147159. From there it becomes a dual carriageway straight through the village and the adjoining refinery, until the roundabout at TA169165. From there a short piece of single carriageway runs to the end of the public road at TA177166.

The current route length is 3.2 miles.
