= Wootton, Lincolnshire =

Village in Lincolnshire, England

Coordinates: 53.631074°N 0.352306°W

Wootton
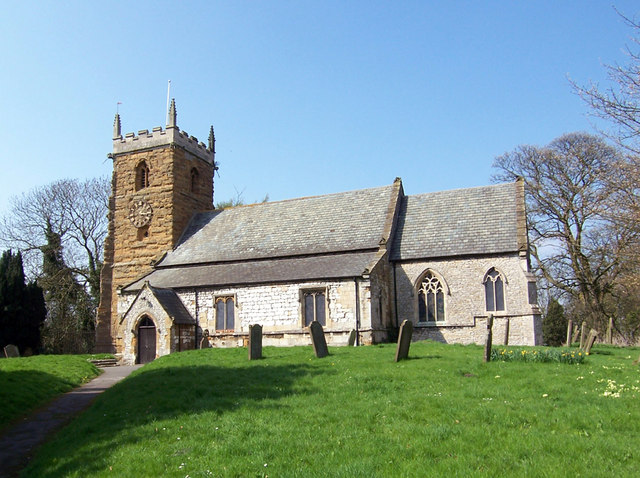
- St Andrew's Church, Wootton

- Location within Lincolnshire
- Population: 475 (2011)
- OS grid reference: TA090162
  - London: 145 mi (233 km) S
- Unitary authority: North Lincolnshire
- Ceremonial county: Lincolnshire
- Region: Yorkshire and the Humber
- Country: England
- Sovereign state: United Kingdom
- Post town: ULCEBY
- Postcode district: DN39
- Dialling code: 01469
- Police: Humberside
- Fire: Humberside
- Ambulance: East Midlands
- UK Parliament: Brigg and Immingham

Wootton is a small village and civil parish in North Lincolnshire, England. The population of the civil parish at the 2011 census was 475. It is situated 5 miles (8 km) south-east from Barton-upon-Humber, 7 miles (11 km) north-east from Brigg and 3 miles (5 km) north from Humberside Airport.

== History ==
A large mound, locally known as Galley Hill, has been designated a Scheduled monument as it is believed to be a Bronze Age Round barrow dating from 2600 to 700 B.C.

A unique Romano-British linchpin, in the form of an upright thumb, was found by an agricultural worker in the 1980s. It was purchased by the North Lincolnshire Museum.

Wootton is an Anglo-Saxon settlement and is recorded in the Domesday Book as "Udetune". Inhabited by 8 villagers, 7 smallholders and 71 freemen, in over 40 households, it was considered 'very large'. The lordship of the manor was jointly held by Odo of Bayeux, a half-brother of William the Conqueror and Ralph de Mortimer, with Mortimer the tenant-in-chief.

The Anglo-Saxon church of St Andrew is constructed of stone in Early English style, and was restored in 1851.

To the North of the village is the Grade II* listed Wootton Hall which was built in 1796 for John Uppleby. Surrounding structures including a house (formerly one of a pair), a barn, the hall gates, and stables and other outbuildings, are also Grade II listed with English Heritage.

There was a village windmill on Green Lane, but it was demolished in the mid-20th century.

== Community ==
The 2001 Census recorded 492 residents in the parish of Wootton, inhabiting 216 properties.

The village is surrounded by arable land and has retained its character as a result of its designation as a "limited growth settlement" by North Lincolnshire Council. It is known locally for its large pond, which lies at the eastern end of the village. Whilst there is no longer a village shop or post office, there is a village hall, a small primary school, and a public house – the Nags Head. The village water pump was renovated in 2009 and is located on High Street.

Wootton came second in the Campaign to Protect Rural England's 2009 Best Kept Village competition.
