= A180 road (England) =

Road in northern England

A180

Route information
- Part of E22
- Length: 16.87 mi (27.15 km)

Major junctions
- West end: Barnetby-le-Wold; 53.5840°N 0.4225°W
- M180; A15; A16 A160 A1098 A1173; A46
- East end: Cleethorpes; 53.5610°N 0.0356°W

Location
- Country: United Kingdom
- Constituent country: England
- Primary destinations: Grimsby, Immingham

Road network
- Roads in the United Kingdom; Motorways; A and B road zones

The A180 is a primary route in northern England, that runs from the M180 motorway to Cleethorpes. The road is a continuation of the M180, but built to lower specifications: it is mainly dual two-lane without hard shoulders. The road is (mostly grade separated) dual carriageway for 16.87 miles (27.15 km) from the M180 to Grimsby, and is a single carriageway road for 2 miles (3.2 km) between Grimsby and Cleethorpes beach.

== Route ==
The A180 begins at junction 5 of the M180 in North Lincolnshire, where it picks up traffic from the motorway and the A15 road heading towards the ports of Grimsby and Immingham. The road crosses the border into North East Lincolnshire and has a junction with the A160 road to Immingham Dock. It bypasses the town of Immingham and Habrough before meeting the A1173 road (linking to the A46 road to Lincoln). The road then has a junction with the A1136 road prior to having two roundabout junctions with local roads. In central Grimsby, the A180 meets the A16 road (to Louth and Boston) at a roundabout, and continues along the front into Cleethorpes. In central Cleethopes the A180 terminates at a roundabout with the A46 road (clee road)and the A1098 road(Isaacs hill).

=== Construction ===
In 1975 there would be a 'motorway link road' between Grimsby and Barnetby with three possible routes

- Northern - north of Brocklesby, enters Grimsby at Pyewipe
- Central - between the two, possibly to link to the Laceby bypass
- Southern - followed the A18, with modest bypasses of Great Limber and Keelby

The northern route was the most likely, as Immingham only needed a short spur road. The M180 was to be finished by 1978, and the link road' by 1980. The borough engineer was William Webster

By June 1975 - there were four routes, to start by 1978, with southern two routes reaching the A18 at Riby crossroads. It was not decided if it would be a motorway. On Friday 2 July 1976, the government said it wanted the north route, announced by Ken Marks

A public enquiry into the route began on Tuesday 5 December 1978 at Ulceby Community Centre. Lincolnshire County Council favoured the A18 route, and Habrough parish council had put forward another route. Officially it was the Brigg Bypass to Grimsby Section of the Sheffield - Grimsby Trunk Road, to be completed by 1982.

In September 1979 the road route, as the A18, was confirmed. 14 miles would cost £30m, to start by the end of 1980. Another enquiry was held at Ulceby on Tuesday 22 January 1980.

Budge started work on Tuesday 5 May 1981; the contract was £13m for eight miles in May 1981, to finish in the summer of 1983. Monk were given the contract of £14.5m in early October 1981, to start in late October 1981, for the six miles from Ulceby to Pyewipe.

The first 5.75 miles opened in late March 1983.

== History and noise ==
The A180 was opened in 1983 as an extension to the M180.

Its ribbed concrete surface made it the noisiest road in the United Kingdom at that time. In June 2017, sound levels inside a family car travelling along the road were measured at up to 92 decibels.

In the 2000s, parts of the road that lie close to inhabited areas were resurfaced with tarmac following continued complaints and campaigns. Calls for the entire stretch of the road to be resurfaced continued. In March 2018 it was announced that the remaining concrete sections would be resurfaced in three stages at a cost of £10 million.
