= Kirkby Wharfe =

Village in North Yorkshire, England

Coordinates: 53.861920°N 1.231390°W

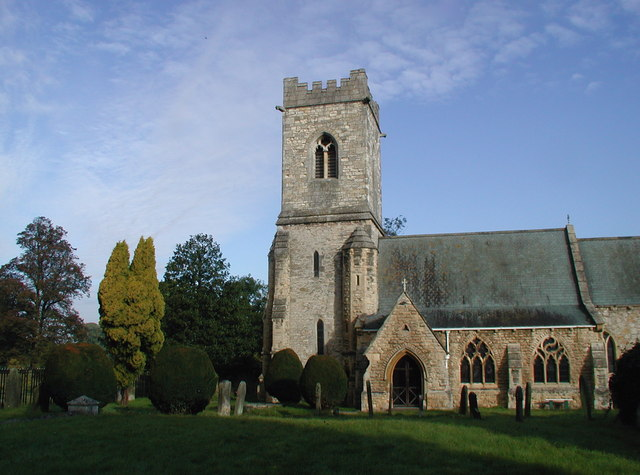
- St John the Baptist, Kirkby Wharfe

- Location within North Yorkshire
- Population: 173 2011 Census
- OS grid reference: SE506409
- Civil parish: Kirkby Wharfe with North Milford
- Unitary authority: North Yorkshire
- Ceremonial county: North Yorkshire
- Region: Yorkshire and the Humber
- Country: England
- Sovereign state: United Kingdom
- Post town: TADCASTER
- Postcode district: LS24
- Police: North Yorkshire
- Fire: North Yorkshire
- Ambulance: Yorkshire

Kirkby Wharfe is a village 1.9 miles (3 km) south of Tadcaster, in North Yorkshire, England. The village is in the civil parish of Kirkby Wharfe with North Milford.

From 1974 to 2023 it was part of the Selby District, it is now administered by the unitary North Yorkshire Council.

The area around Kirkby Wharfe was settled in Roman times, with a permanent settlement being started in the 8th century. The village is recorded in the Domesday Book as being Chirchebi (church village), and both the village and Grimston Park came under the influence of the Baron of Pontefract at the time of Domesday.

The village is only 0.62 miles (1 km) away from Ulleskelf which has a railway station on the York to Pontefract Line. The nearest public bus service runs from Ulleskelf with 5 buses a day between Tadcaster and Pontefract.

A small area east of the village is a designated SSSI. First notified in 1984, the SSSI details that the floodplain of the River Wharfe is an important site for marshland and the associated plants that grow on marshland around Dorts Dike (a tributary of the Wharfe that enters the river at Ulleskelf).

St John the Baptist's Church, Kirkby Wharfe, built in the 12th and 14th centuries serves as the parish church for the Ecclesiastical Parish of Kirkby Wharfe and Ulleskelfe[sic]. The former St Saviour's at Ulleskelf village is now the Village Hall.

West of the village is Grimston Park Estate which was the former seat of Lord Londesborough from 1851 to 1872 when it was acquired by the Fielden family.

== See also ==
- Listed buildings in Kirkby Wharfe with North Milford
