= Osbern D'Arques =

11th c Landowner in Yorkshire post-Norman Conquest

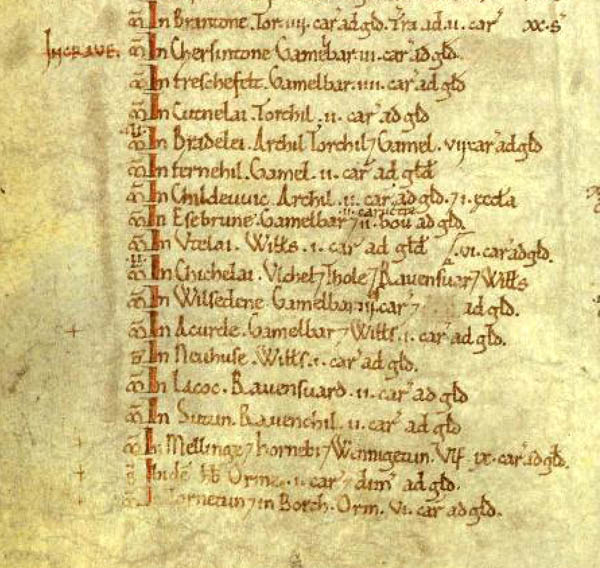
Domesday Book folio 301v

Osbern d'Arques, was a High Sheriff of Yorkshire following the Norman conquest of England.

Born about 1064, he was the son of Guillaume d'Arques and nephew of Geofrey Tison. He died about 1115 in Thorp Arch, England.

He was a prominent landowner mentioned in the Domesday Book, and seems to have given testimony in the Domesday account himself.

He held lands as Tenant-in-chief in Redbourne, Scawby and Sturton, all in Lincolnshire, Askham, Hebden, North Yorkshire, and Craven. He also appears to have had business dealings with William Malet, his successor as High Sheriff.
