= Eliza Fletcher =

English autobiographer and travel writer

- Born: Eliza Dawson; 15 January 1770; Oxton, Yorkshire
- Died: 5 February 1858 (aged 88); Edinburgh

Eliza Fletcher, née Dawson (15 January 1770 – 5 February 1858) was an English autobiographer and early travel writer.

== Life and works ==
Fletcher was born at Oxton, near Tadcaster in Yorkshire, to a land surveyor named Dawson, and lived on a little family estate. Eliza was the only child of Dawson's marriage with the eldest daughter of William Hill. The mother died ten days after the birth. At eleven years old Eliza, a good-looking, intelligent girl, was sent to the Manor School at York. The mistress (Mrs. Forster) was "a very well-disposed, conscientious old gentlewoman", but incapable of proper superintendence: "Four volumes of the Spectator constituted the whole school library." Eliza gained a profound admiration for the poet William Mason, then a York celebrity, especially on account of his "Monody" upon his wife's death, but was shocked at seeing him "a little fat old man of hard-favoured countenance", devoted to whist.

When Eliza was 17, accident brought to her father's house a Scottish advocate, Archibald Fletcher, "of about forty-three, and of a grave, gentlemanlike, prepossessing appearance." They carried on a literary correspondence for a year, and after another meeting became engaged, though her father opposed the union, preferring a higher suitor, Lord Grantley. Miss Dawson called on a friend, Dr Kilvington, to tell Lord Grantley of her engagement. On 16 July 1791 the lovers were married in Tadcaster Church. Her father did not attend the ceremony, but sent his blessing. For the 37 years before her husband died, "there was not a happier couple in the three kingdoms." They had six children.

Archibald Fletcher's steady adherence to his Whig principles prevented his getting into practice, and they were often reduced to their last guinea. Her sympathy prevented her from ever regretting the sacrifice to principle. Afterwards success in life set steadily in with little interruption. Mrs Fletcher died at Lancrigg, Grasmere, on 5 February 1858.

Eliza's blank-verse Elidure and her "historical dramatic sketches" Edward were written in 1820 and printed privately in 1825. They show the influence of Joanna Baillie, who admired them, as did Anne Grant and Lucy Aikin. Fletcher's Autobiography, of which a few copies had been printed for private circulation in Carlisle in 1874, was published at Edinburgh the following year under the editorship of her surviving child, the widow of Sir John Richardson, the Arctic explorer. The Life also contains a memoir by Mrs Fletcher of her daughter Grace, and another of her son Archibald, by his widow. It is an attractive book about a most lovable woman, who seems, according to her portraits, at 15 and at 80, to prove "that there is a beauty for every age."
