= Hygebald =

Hygebald (and variants such as Hygbald, Higbald, and Higebald) can refer to any of two or three known Anglo-Saxons:

1. Hygebald, abbot and author of a prayer beginning "in primis obsecro supplex obnixis precibus" (possibly identical with 2 below)
2. Hybald (seventh-century saint)
3. Higbald of Lindisfarne (died 803)
