= Oxton =

Oxton may refer to:

- Oxton, Merseyside, England
  - Oxton (ward), an electoral ward of the Wirral Metropolitan Borough Council
- Oxton, North Yorkshire, England
- Oxton, Nottinghamshire, England
- Oxton, Scottish Borders, Scotland
- Oxton, Kenton, Devon, England, an historic estate
