= Archibald Fletcher =

Archibald Fletcher may refer to:

- Archibald Fletcher (reformer) (1746–1828), Scottish reformer
- Archibald Fletcher on 1956 Birthday Honours
