= North Kelsey =

Village and civil parish in the West Lindsey district of Lincolnshire, England

Coordinates: 53.5018°N 0.4283°W

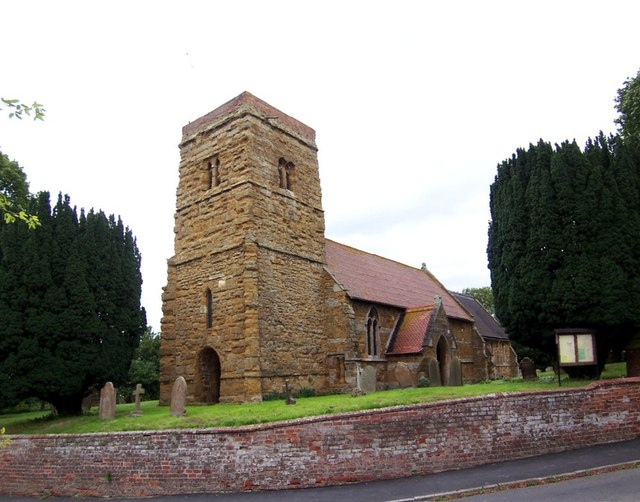
- All Hallows' Church, North Kelsey

- Location within Lincolnshire
- Population: 966 (2011)
- OS grid reference: TA0410
  - London: 135 mi (217 km) S
- Civil parish: North Kelsey
- District: West Lindsey
- Shire county: Lincolnshire
- Region: East Midlands
- Country: England
- Sovereign state: United Kingdom
- Post town: MARKET RASEN
- Postcode district: LN7
- Dialling code: 01652
- Police: Lincolnshire
- Fire: Lincolnshire
- Ambulance: East Midlands
- UK Parliament: Gainsborough

North Kelsey is a village and civil parish in the West Lindsey district of Lincolnshire, England. The village is situated 4 miles (6 km) west from Caistor and 19 miles (31 km) north-east from Lincoln.

Within the parish is the hamlet of North Kelsey Moor. Also nearby is the former North Kelsey railway station.

According to the 2001 Census North Kelsey had a population of 959, increasing slightly to 966 at the 2011 census.

== Community ==
North Kelsey has an Anglican church and a Methodist chapel. There is a village hall, primary school, a public house, The Butcher's Arms, and a recently renovated windmill. The village post office was closed in 2008, as part of a series of rural post-office closures, the remaining general store and newsagents closed in 2019.

== Landmarks ==
North Kelsey parish church was dedicated to St Nicholas until the late 19th century, after which dedicated to All Hallows. The church was rebuilt in 1869, although the tower dates from the 13th century. An early stone coffin lid lies against the outside wall The church suffered minor damage in a whirlwind which hit South and North Kelsey in the 1930s.

Facing the church is Grade II listed Church Farm The central part of the house is Elizabethan, with later Georgian additions, including larger windows. The south wall of the house is constructed in the same manner, and is the same age as, the 13th-century church tower.

The adjacent village of Hibaldstow is reached by crossing Hibaldstow Bridge, an iron lattice girder bridge, built in 1889, that spans the River Ancholme.

The former RAF Caistor is chiefly within the parish, and the concrete bases of three Thor IRBM launch pads remain.

== Sport ==
The North Kelsey mixed tennis league was established in 1966. The League includes the majority of tennis clubs in North Lincolnshire, and others in the North East Lincolnshire Unitary Authority area. Some of the league's clubs are affiliated to the Lawn Tennis Association of Great Britain.

The North Kelsey Sports Association on South Street is home to the North Kelsey Bowls Club.

== See also ==
- Hibaldstow Bridge
- South Kelsey
