= William Fowler (artist) =

English artist (1761–1832)

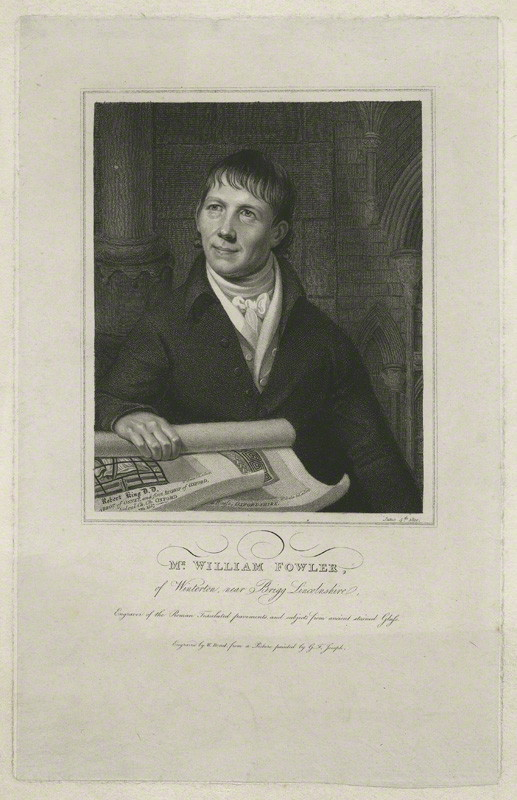
William Fowler by William Bond, after George Francis Joseph.

William Fowler (12 March 1761 – 22 September 1832) was an English artist.

Fowler was born at Winterton, Lincolnshire. His father was Joseph Fowler, a builder at "The Chains" in West Street.

Fowler became an architect and builder at Winterton, and about 1796, made drawings of Roman pavements discovered there. He took them to London to be engraved by his brother-in-law, Mr Hill. There he studied the process of copper-plate engraving, and in April 1799 brought out his own coloured engraving of a Roman pavement at Roxby. Between 1799 and 1829, he published three volumes of coloured engravings of twenty-five pavements, thirty-nine subjects from painted glass, five brasses and incised slabs, four fonts and eight miscellaneous subjects. He also created at least twenty-nine unpublished engravings, mostly of objects of antiquity. Many of the published plates were accompanied by printed broadsides.

He became acquainted with Sir Walter Scott and other celebrities, and was presented on at least one occasion to the royal family at Windsor. Some of his work can be seen in North Lincolnshire Museum in Scunthorpe and Baysgarth House Museum in Barton-upon-Humber.

Sir Joseph Banks said of him: "Others have shown us what they thought these remains ought to have been, but Fowler has shown us what they are, and that is what we want." According to the Dictionary of National Biography his works are distinguished by a strict fidelity especially remarkable at the time. Whenever it was possible he worked from tracings, rubbings, etc. It is claimed that he was the first to introduce the lead-lines in representations of painted glass. There is a characteristic portrait of him by W. Bond, from a painting by George Francis Joseph, A.R.A., dated 4 June 1810.

Fowler, though a member of the Church of England, was also a ‘class-leader’ among the Methodists. He died 22 September 1832, and was buried at Winterton under a cruciform slab.

== Buildings and Architectural Work by William Fowler ==
Most of the information about Fowlers buildings and renovation work comes from The Correspondence of William Fowler which was privately published by his grandson in 1907.

=== Renovation work to churches ===
- Manton. Lincolnshire. 1809.
- Appleby 1820-3
- Winteringham 1827.
- Adlingfleet, Yorkshire.

=== Houses ===
- Cleatham Hall Coach House. 1802.
- Leadenham Rectory. Lincolnshire 1821–3.
- The Rectory, Caythorpe, Lincolnshire. Possibly refronted by Fowler for the Rev. George Woodcock in 1827. Plain with two and half storey central porch. In the garden a gothic crenellated garden house.
- Gate Burton Hall 1824–7.
- Messingham Vicarage, Lincolnshire. 1813–18.
- Roxby Low Rise Farmhouse
- Subdeanery, Minster Yard, Lincoln. c. 1813.
- Appleby Hall’ Lincolnshire 1821-3. Now demolished.
- Winterton *The Chains or “Gothic Cottage”, West Street,. 1827–8. Built by Fowler for himself. The rendered house has a low central bay flanked by three-storey bays, the upper floors of which project over coved jetties. These overhangs have been partly underbuilt since in order to give more support.
- Appleby Spring Wood House, 1823. This house has been attributed to Fowler or his son Joseph. A castellated Gothic hunting lodge, with wings flanking a canted centrepiece. Within is an octagonal room known as the lunch room, with plaster vault and original Gothic furniture. It is listed Grade II.

=== Other Buildings ===
- Newark National School, Nottinghamshire. now the Mount School.
- Newark Subscription Library and Reading Room, Market Place.

== Literature ==
- Antram N (revised), Pevsner, N. & Harris J, (1989), The Buildings of England: Lincolnshire, Yale University Press.
- Colvin H. A (1995), Biographical Dictionary of British Architects 1600–1840. Yale University Press, 3rd edition London, pg. 378.
- Fowler J F(1907), The Correspondence of William Fowler.

This article incorporates text from a publication now in the public domain: "Fowler, William (1761-1832)". Dictionary of National Biography. London: Smith, Elder & Co. 1885–1900.
