= John Hunsley =

John Hunsley was a bagpiper from Manton near Kirton in Lindsey in north Lincolnshire, and the last known player of the Lincolnshire bagpipes, which he played until shortly before his death at around 1850.

Hunsley's music was described as unrefined, or "unmelodious", but popular amongst his peers. Hunsley was known to play for riotous parties where guests "danced until the brick dust came through the soles of their feet." One commentator noted that Hunsley's bagpipe was "little more than the Oaten Pipe improved with a bag." Organologist Anthony Baines notes that Hunsley used to send his pipes to be "tuned" in Edinburgh. Another reference claimed that he took the pipes himself, on a white pony. The same authority recorded that he was a champion boxer and wrestler, defeated only once in his life.
