= Lincolnshire bagpipes =

It is unclear whether Lincolnshire bagpipes refer to a specific type of pipes native to Lincolnshire, England, or to the popularity of a more general form of pipes in the region. Written records of bagpipes being associated with Lincolnshire date back to 1407, but it is difficult to find certain proof that any regional variation of the bagpipe existed which was peculiar to Lincolnshire. Despite the lack of evidence for a uniquely local instrument, it is clear that the bagpipe was enjoyed by the people of Lincolnshire.

By the modern era, the bagpipe had largely fallen out of use in Lincolnshire and a 1901 commentator noted that it had become defunct by 1850. By 1881, later researchers had identified that the 19th-century farmer, John Hunsley, had played the bagpipes "up to a short time before his death, which took place twenty or thirty years ago (i.e. between 1851 and 1861)." Hunsley lived in Manton, near Kirton-in-Lindsey. In 1984 John Addison, a pipemaker in South Somercotes, began his research to try to establish whether a uniquely local "Lincolnshire bagpipe" existed, and in 1989, he finished making a set of bagpipes based on the limited sources he found.

== Description ==
In 1407 we find possibly the earliest reference to bagpipes in Lincolnshire: "It is right well that Pilgrims have with them both singers and pipers." John Bale added a note in the margin: "Well spoken, my Lord, for the Lincolnshire Bagpipes".

Michael Drayton (1563–1631) writes in Poly-Olbion: "Bean belly, Leicestershire her attribute doth bear. And Bells and Bagpipes next, belong to Lincolnshire."

Sometime prior to 1662, Thomas Fuller had written: "I behold these as most ancient, because a very simple sort of music, being little more than an oaten pipe improved with a bag, wherein the imprisoned wind pleadeth melodiously for the enlargement thereof. It is incredible with what agility it inspireth the heavy heels of the country clowns, overgrown with hair and rudeness, probably the ground-work of the poetical fiction of dancing satyrs. This bagpipe, in the judgement of the rural Midas's, carrieth away the credit from the harp or Appollo himself; and most persons approve the blunt bagpipe above the edge-tool instruments of drums and trumpets in our civil dissensions."

Several commentators note the enthusiasm of Lincolnshire people for the bagpipes. The 1817 A Complete collection of English proverbs, predating the believed extinction of the pipes, notes of the "Lincolnshire bagpipes" that they are so named because, "Whether because the people here do more delight in the bagpipes than others, or whether they are more cunning in playing upon them; indeed the former of these will infer the latter."

The pipes were often noted in period literature as a simile for unpleasant noise, and an 1875 commentator noted that in his time the term "Lincolnshire bagpipes" was a local colloquialism for the croaking of frogs. A 1933 publication also describes them as "a particularly clumsy instrument emitting a doleful and monotonous sound."

A description from 1885 refers to bagpipes, extant in Lincolnshire, as having only one drone, and Addison's interpretation maintains this attribute.

== Literature ==
The pipes are famously mentioned by the character Falstaff in William Shakespeare's play Henry IV, Part 1 (c. 1597) in which he likens his melancholy to their sound: "Sblood, I am as melancholy as a gib cat or a lugged bear...Yea, or the drone of a Lincolnshire bagpipe." Robert Armin, an actor in Shakespeare's company, also mentions the bagpipe in his prose work A Nest of Ninnies (1608): "At Christmas time, amongst all the pleasure provided, a noyse of minstrells and a Lincolnshire bagpipe was prepared – the minstrells for the great chamber, the bagpipe for the hall – the minstrells to serve up the knights meate, and the bagpipe for the common dauncing."

== Research ==
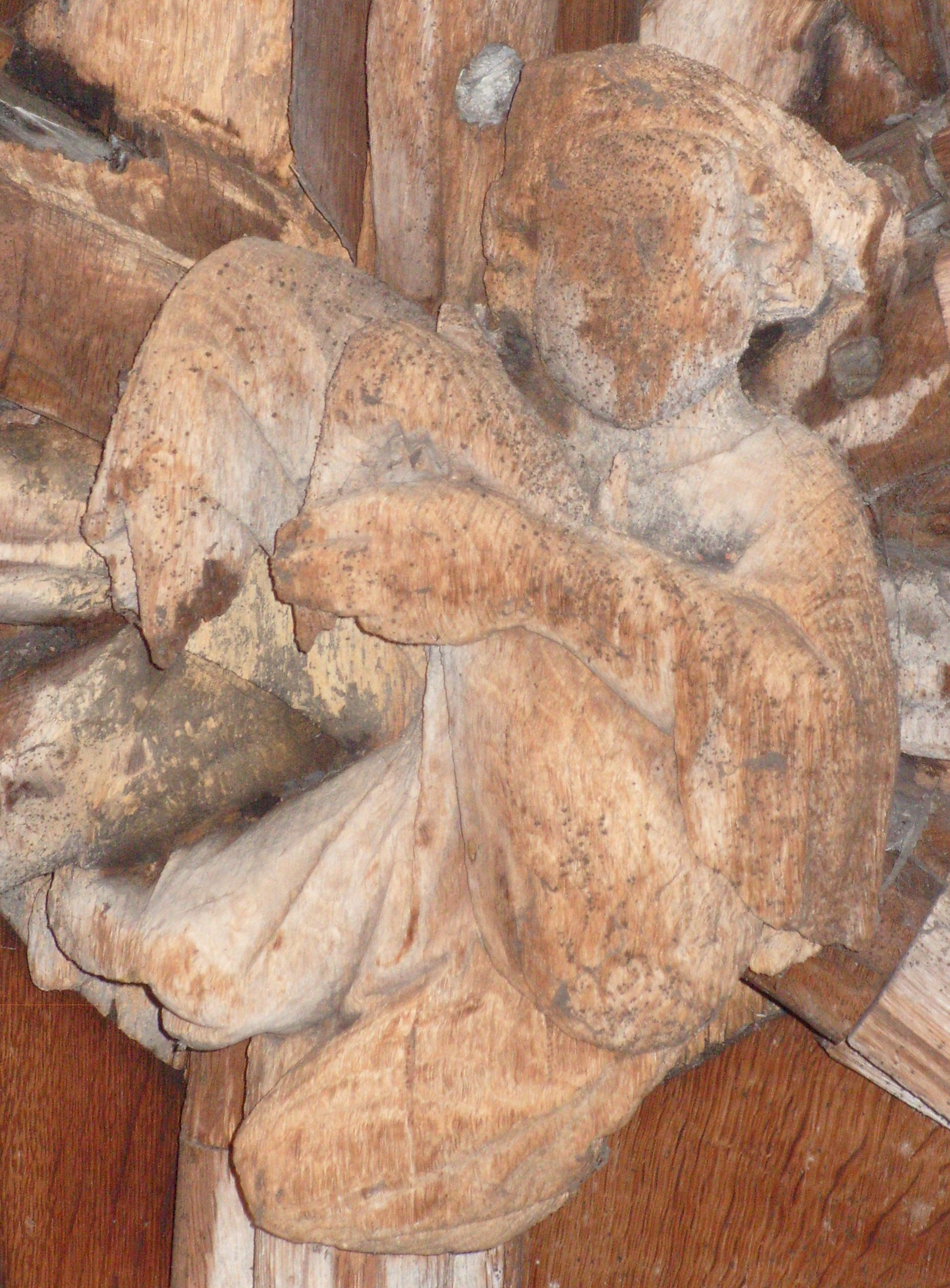
Carving of a bagpiper: Lincoln Cathedral Cloister

Limestone relief carving of a bagpiper and three dancers – taken from Moorby church (Lincolnshire) before it was demolished in 1982

According to their own records, on 12 November 1988, the Lincolnshire Heritage Trust (now renamed Heritage Trust of Lincolnshire) commissioned pipemaker John Addison of South Somercotes to undertake research into historic bagpipes in Lincolnshire and to create a set of Lincolnshire pipes based on that research. Addison was a maker of Northumbrian smallpipes, Irish pipes, Musettes de Cour, Border and Lowland pipes and Northumbrian Half Longs. Addison was well aware of the high degree of conjecture that anyone recreating a bagpipe, of the type once seen in Lincolnshire, would have to employ. In 1984, Addison wrote about the carving in Branston Church: "This powerful but primitive motif gives at least some information; it shows a bagpipe with one chanter (melody pipe) which is probably conical, one drone with a bell end, and it is mouth blown". Addison goes on to say "This description also covers pipes which would undoubtedly have been seen in a large part of Eastern Europe, most of Western Europe and some of North Africa and can be still seen in some of these places today". Addison reached the conclusion, from his research on the possible existence of a regional bagpipe for Lincolnshire, that the closest relative of such a pipe was the Spanish gaita gallega, which he believed to be the most straightforward form of the bagpipe existing in Europe. Addison based his new pipes on three carvings: a pew end carving in All Saints' Church, Branston; an oak ceiling boss in the cloister of Lincoln Cathedral and a stone carving taken from Moorby Church before it was demolished in November 1982. All three depictions appear to have a conical chanter and a single bass drone. The pipes made by Addison strongly physically resemble the Spanish gaita.

== Revival ==
Folk musician Annie Walker played the resulting pipes during a ceremony at All Saints' Church, Branston, Lincolnshire, in September 2002. In April 2012, the Addison pipes were loaned to musician Al Garrod, founder of the recreated City of Lincoln Waites, the medieval band of the Mayor of Lincoln.
