= Grimston (near Tadcaster) =

Civil parish in North Yorkshire, England

Coordinates: 53.865865°N 1.2425387°W

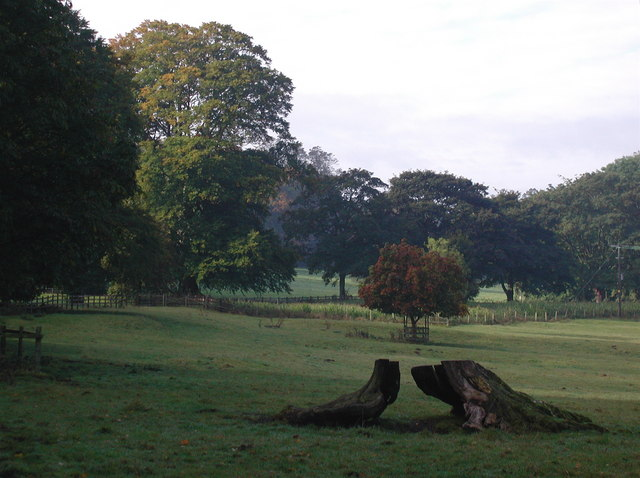
- Grimston Park

- Location within North Yorkshire
- Area: 3.42 km^{2} (1.32 sq mi)
- Population: 59 (2001 census)
  - Density: 17/km^{2} (44/sq mi)
- Civil parish: Grimston
- Unitary authority: North Yorkshire
- Ceremonial county: North Yorkshire
- Region: Yorkshire and the Humber
- Country: England
- Sovereign state: United Kingdom
- Police: North Yorkshire
- Fire: North Yorkshire
- Ambulance: Yorkshire

Grimston is a civil parish about 8 miles from York, in North Yorkshire, England. In 2001 the parish had a population of 59. The parish touches Bolton Percy, Kirkby Wharfe with North Milford, Oxton, Stutton with Hazlewood, Tadcaster and Towton. From 1974 to 2023 it was part of the Selby District, it is now administered by the unitary North Yorkshire Council.

== Features ==
There are 14 listed buildings in Grimston.

== History ==
The name "Grimston" means 'Grimr's farm/settlement. Grimston was recorded in the Domesday Book of 1086 as Mitune. Grimston was formerly a township in the parish of Kirkby Wharf; in 1866 Grimston became a civil parish in its own right.

James VI and I came to Grimston Park, the house of Sir Edward Stanhope, on 19 April 1603. He knighted 11 men including Roger Aston and Charles Montagu.
