= Hibaldstow Bridge =

Coordinates: 53.5006°N 0.4872°W

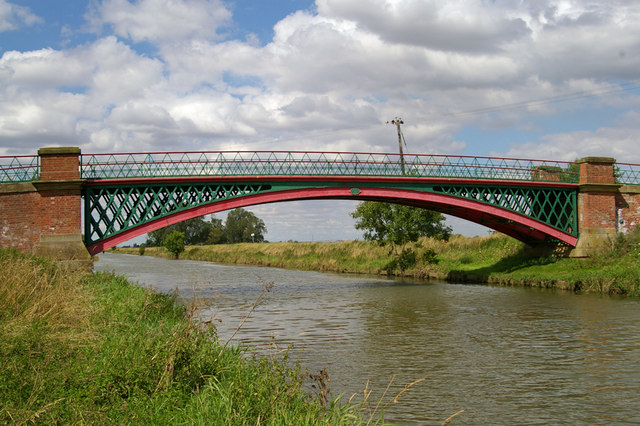
Hibaldstow Bridge as seen from the bank the Ancholme River

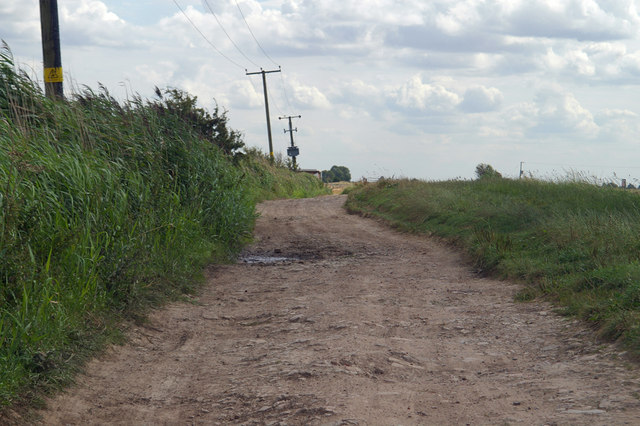
A rough track runs south from Hibaldstow Bridge to connect with the end of Starham Road, North Kelsey

Hibaldstow Bridge is an iron arch bridge that spans the River Ancholme, near the villages of Hibaldstow, in North Lincolnshire, and North Kelsey, in the West Lindsey district of Lincolnshire. A plaque mounted in the centre of the bridge reads "Erected By JTB Porter & Co. 1889 Lincoln".

The bridge is a British Listed Building, and was Grade II listed on 6 January 1987. Its Historic England ID is 166019.

The last part of the single-track road leading to the bridge from North Kelsey, known as Starham Road, is not asphalted and can be dangerous during adverse weather conditions as it runs on top of the embankment. It is, in places, badly potholed. On maps, the riverside stretch of road is either not marked, or shown as being of minimal quality.

The bridge was used as the site to burn a Ford Transit Van involved in the burglary of an ATM in the second half of 2019. The bridge is now unusable as there are three large holes burnt into it.

Refurbishment (2024–2025)

Between 2024 and 2025, Hibaldstow Bridge underwent an extensive programme of refurbishment and restoration works carried out by Jackson Civil Engineering. The project aimed to ensure the long-term safety and functionality of the bridge while preserving its historical and heritage significance.

As part of the works, the wrought-iron latticework handrails were carefully repaired where possible, with pure iron replacements fabricated for sections that could not be restored. New steel transom beams and a solid oak deck were installed, and various structural elements beneath the bridge were repaired and strengthened to enhance durability and longevity.

All metalwork was undertaken by heritage-trained expert blacksmiths Anwick Forge, ensuring the craftsmanship remained faithful to the bridge's original character. The project was recognised for its sustainable and sensitive approach, with Jackson Civil Engineering receiving an Environmental Excellence Award from the Civil Engineering Contractors Association (CECA).
