= Listed buildings in Kirkby Wharfe with North Milford =

Kirkby Wharfe with North Milford is a civil parish in the county of North Yorkshire, England. It contains seven listed buildings that are recorded in the National Heritage List for England. Of these, one is listed at Grade II*, the middle of the three grades, and the others are at Grade II, the lowest grade. The parish contains the village of Kirkby Wharfe and the surrounding countryside. The listed buildings consist of a church, a grave slab in the churchyard, a churchyard cross, and four houses.

== Key ==
Grade	Criteria
II*	Particularly important buildings of more than special interest
II	Buildings of national importance and special interest

== Buildings ==
Name and location	Photograph	Date	Notes	Grade
St John the Baptist's Church; 53.86343°N 1.23192°W		Late 12th century	The church has been altered and extended through the centuries, including a restoration in 1860 by George Shaw. It is built in magnesian limestone and sandstone with a Welsh slate roof. The church consists of a nave, north and south aisles, a south porch, a chancel with a north chapel, and a west tower. The tower has two stages, a plinth, diagonal buttresses, a southwest stair turret, lancet windows, two-light bell openings, gargoyles, and an embattled parapet. The porch has a pointed arch, and the inner doorway has a round arch, a double-chamfered surround, and a single order of colonnettes with waterleaf capitals.	II*
Churchyard cross 53.86316°N 1.23233°W		Medieval	The cross to the southwest of St John the Baptist's Church is in sandstone. It has a stepped plinth, a bell-shaped base, a cylindrical shaft, and a multi-faceted geometric figure on the head.	II
Grave slab 53.86340°N 1.23177°W	—	Medieval	The grave slab is in the churchyard of St John the Baptist's Church to the south of the chancel. It is in sandstone, and has a trapezoid plan, and an incised foliate cross.	II
Woodside Cottage; 53.86125°N 1.23099°W		Early 17th century	The village school, later a private house, it is in magnesian limestone with a tile roof. There are two storeys, a U-shaped plan, and a front range of three bays. On the front is a gabled porch with a round-headed entrance, and the windows are casements.	II
North Milford Hall; 53.84859°N 1.23236°W		Early 18th century	The house is in pinkish-brown brick with stone dressings, a moulded floor band, and a hipped stone slate roof. There are two storeys and a basement, a square plan, and fronts of three bays. Sven steps lead up to a central doorway with an architrave and a fanlight. In the basement are blocked mullioned windows, and the windows elsewhere are sashes with moulded sills and cambered heads.	II
The Old Vicarage; 53.86325°N 1.23149°W	—	Mid 18th century (probable)	The vicarage, later a private house, is in magnesian limestone with a partly hipped pantile roof. There are two storeys, and a T-shaped plan, with a front range of two bays and a two-bay wing. On the front is a doorway with a wedge lintel, and a porch, and in the main block are sash windows, some horizontally-sliding. The wing has quoins, blocked openings, and a re-used mullioned and transomed window.	II
The White House; 53.86176°N 1.23103°W		Late 18th century (probable)	The house is in red brick, stuccoed on the front, with a Welsh slate roof. There are two storeys, three bays, and a rear outshut. The central doorway has a fanlight with radial glazing, and the windows are sashes.	II
