= Listed buildings in Grimston (near Tadcaster) =

Grimston is a civil parish in the former Selby district of North Yorkshire, England. It contains 14 listed buildings that are recorded in the National Heritage List for England. Of these, one is listed at Grade II*, the middle of the three grades, and the others are at Grade II, the lowest grade. There are no significant settlements in the parish, and the main building is the country house, Grimston Park. The house is listed and, apart from one house outside its grounds, all the listed buildings are associated with it, and are in its gardens and grounds.

== Key ==
| Grade | Criteria |
|---|---|
| II* | Particularly important buildings of more than special interest |
| II | Buildings of national importance and special interest |

== Buildings ==
| Name and location | Photograph | Date | Notes | Grade |
|---|---|---|---|---|
| Grimston Park; 53.86473°N 1.24379°W | — | 18th century (probable) | A small country house that was largely rebuilt in about 1840 by Decimus Burton, and later converted into smaller dwellings. It is in Tadcaster limestone with roofs of Welsh slate and tile. The main range has two storeys and seven bays, and a single-bay three-storey tower and a five-bay loggia to the right. On the front is an Ionic tetrastyle portico, above which is a Venetian window, and the other windows are sashes. Above them is a dentilled cornice and a low balustraded parapet with a coat of arms and urns. On each side of the main range is a lodge and a curving wall. To the left of the main range is a lower two-storey six-bay range, and a clock tower to the left. On the garden front is a hexastyle Ionic portico in antis, with a cornice, and a balcony with a hood on slender columns. | II* |
| Grimston Lodge; 53.86667°N 1.26023°W | — | Early 19th century | The house is in magnesian limestone on a plinth, with a modillion eaves band, and a hipped Welsh slate roof. In the centre is a doorway with an architrave, a fanlight and a pediment, and the windows are sashes. On the right return is a Doric portico with a frieze and a dentilled pediment. | II |
| Founain west of Grimston Park; 53.86451°N 1.24505°W | — | Early to mid 19th century | The fountain is surrounded by a circular stone basin with coped walls. The fountain is in artificial stone, and has a shallow urn with gadrooned sides on an octagonal plinth and a moulded stem, surmounted by three dolphins with the tails entwined, and supporting a shell-like bowl with a cherub. | II |
| Coach house east of Grimston Park; 53.86495°N 1.24208°W | — | c. 1840 | The coach house was designed by Decimus Burton, and later converted into dwellings. It is in magnesian limestone on a plinth, and has a Welsh slate roof with stone copings. In the centre is a two-storey three-bay block with an open moulded pediment with a blind oculus. In the centre is a recessed doorway flanked by a segmental-arched arcade with an impost band, and segmental-headed sash windows. The block is flanked by single-storey two-bay wings with a low parapet and central pedimented dormers. In the right wing are casement windows, and the left wing contains garage doors. | II |
| Entrance lodge, gates, piers and walls, Grimston Park; 53.86470°N 1.25967°W | | c. 1840 | The entrance was designed by Decimus Burton. The lodge is in magnesian limestone on a plinth, with a moulded cornice and a low parapet. There is a single storey and three bays. The doorway has a hood, and on the front is a canted bay window and sash windows. The piers flanking the entrance are square, each with recessed panels, a dentilled frieze, and a moulded cornice surmounted by a ball finial and a flag. The ornamental double and pedestrian gates, and the overthrow, are in wrought iron. Outside these are curving walls with a plinth, a cornice and a frieze, ending in square piers with cornices and ball finials. | II |
| Gates and piers east of Grimston Park; 53.86469°N 1.24028°W | — | c. 1840 | The gates and piers were designed by Decimus Burton. The piers are in rusticated stone with a square plan, each with a moulded cornice and a ball finial, and about 3 metres (9.8 ft) high. The gates are in cast iron, and have an ornamental overthrow. | II |
| Grimston Tower; 53.86136°N 1.25226°W | | c. 1840 | A water tower designed by Decimus Burton, it is in magnesian limestone with a lead roof, and is in Egyptian style. The tower has a square plan tapering to an octagonal top, and has four sages on a stepped plinth. The doorway has a lintel with a mask and a pediment. Above is a moulded floor band, casement windows with a sill band, a round-arched window over which is an oculus, a modillion cornice, am octagonal cupola with a modillion cornice, and a conical roof. | II |
| Lodges, gates, walls, railings and piers north of Grimston Park; 53.86564°N 1.24426°W | — | c. 1840 | The buildings at the north entrance to the grounds were designed by Decimus Burton. The lodges are in magnesian limestone and have a single storey, a square plan and a single bay. Each has a doorway with a hood, angle pilasters, round-arched niches with aprons, a cornice, and a stepped roof surmounted by the kneeling figure of a warrior. The gates are in wrought iron with ornamental cresting. Ornamental railings curve round to rusticated piers with a cornice and a ball finial, and further railings on a low wall lead to rusticated end piers. | II |
| Manège northeast of Grimston Park; 53.86527°N 1.24250°W | — | c. 1840 | The riding school, later used for other purposes, was designed by Decimus Burton. It is in magnesian limestone on a plinth, with a floor band, an overhanging eaves cornice, a pediment, and a hipped Welsh slate roof. There are two storeys and nine bays, the middle three bays projecting under a pediment. The doorway has a fanlight and is in an arched surround. In the ground floor are casement windows, and the upper floor contains Diocletian windows. | II |
| Rose Cottage; 53.86403°N 1.25110°W | — | c. 1840 | A lodge in the grounds of Grimston Park, it is in magnesian limestone, partly rendered, with a tile roof. There is a single storey and three bays. The entrance in the gable end is in a rustic porch, and the windows have twin round-headed lights and straight heads, under wedge lintels. | II |
| Stable block east of Grimston Park; 53.86487°N 1.24268°W | — | c. 1840 | The stable block, later used for other purposes, was designed by Decimus Burton. It consists of a two-storey three-bay centre block, with a pediment containing a blind oculus, and single-storey three-bay wings. In the ground floor is a segmental-arched arcade containing stable doors, and the windows are a mix of sashes and casements, all with segmental heads. The wings have low parapets, pitching doors, and dormers with moulded pediments. | II |
| Summer house west of Grimston Park; 53.86483°N 1.24421°W | — | c. 1840 | The summer house is in sandstone, with marble dressings, engaged pilasters on the corners, a frieze, a cornice and a low parapet. There is a single storey and five bays. In the centre is a tetrastyle Corinthian portico with a frieze decorated with inset marble plaques. There are 20th-century multi-paned windows. | II |
| Walls with obelisks north of Grimston Park; 53.86490°N 1.24414°W | — | c. 1840 | The walls were designed by Decimus Burton and are in magnesian limestone. There are two low curved walls, about 1 metre (3 ft 3 in) high, with a moulded plinth and coping, surmounted by an obelisk at the ends. | II |
| Wall, piers and railings north of Grimston Park; 53.86575°N 1.24430°W | — | c. 1840 | The wall, piers and railings were designed by Decimus Burton. The wall and piers are in magnesian limestone, and the wall is about 30 metres (98 ft) long. The piers are short and square, and each has a cornice and a ball-on—vase finial. The railings are in cast iron and are ornamental, and have a central semicircular balustrade with inverted vase-shaped balusters. | II |
