= Hibaldstow =

Village and civil parish in North Lincolnshire, England

Coordinates: 53.5122°N 0.5209°W

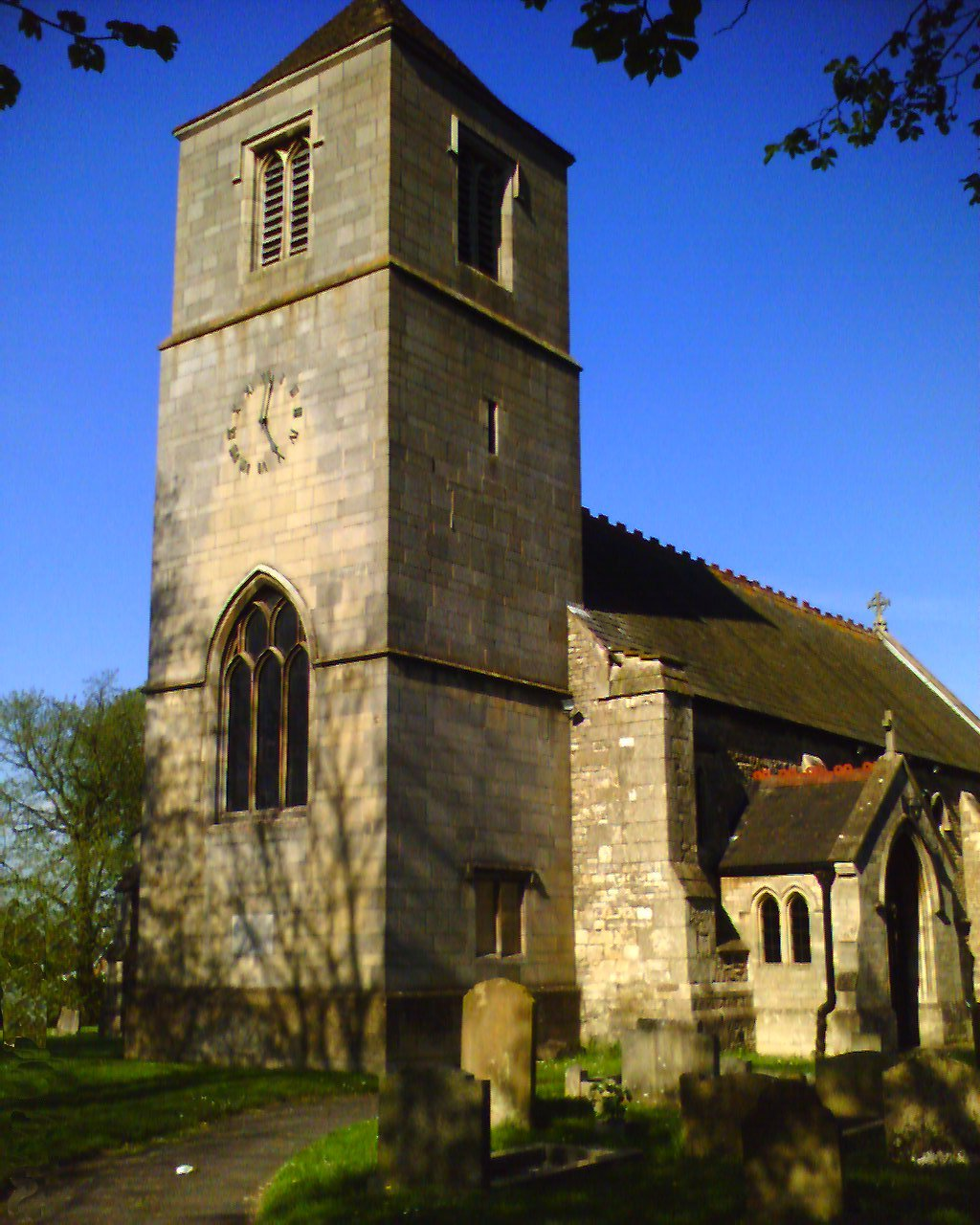
- St Hybald's Church, Hibaldstow

- Location within Lincolnshire
- Population: 2,433 (2011)
- OS grid reference: SE976027
  - London: 140 mi (230 km) S
- Unitary authority: North Lincolnshire
- Ceremonial county: Lincolnshire
- Region: Yorkshire and the Humber
- Country: England
- Sovereign state: United Kingdom
- Post town: Brigg
- Postcode district: DN20
- Police: Humberside
- Fire: Humberside
- Ambulance: East Midlands
- UK Parliament: Scunthorpe

Hibaldstow is a village and civil parish in North Lincolnshire, England. The population of the civil parish at the 2011 census was 2,433. It is situated on the B1206 road, 4 miles (6.4 km) south from Brigg and the M180. The site of the deserted medieval village of Gainsthorpe is nearby.

== History ==
Hibaldstow was founded as a Roman legionary 'roadside fort' on Ermine Street, the road from Lincoln to the Humber; later it became a posting station. The earliest evidence for occupation suggests a date in the late first century. Occupation continued into the late fourth century. There is no Iron Age settlement evidence from the Roman site itself.

The village name derives from Saint Hybald – a Northumbrian missionary who came to the area in the latter part of the 7th century. Described as a 'shadowy figure' the missionary became Abbot of Bardney and later a saint. Three churches around the village – then known as Ceceseg – became dedicated to him when he was made a saint. The name 'Hibaldstow' comes from Old English Hygebald+stow, for "Place where St Hygebald is buried". From 1066 to 1087 the village was referred to as "Hibaldestowa". It appeared in the Domesday Book of 1086 as "Hiboldestou". Variations in the spelling are many, even within a single document. Some writers have suggested that the name was originally Hubba, a Danish commander or leader.

In 1916 Cox stated: "In this parish, on the old line of the Ermine Street, is the entrenched camp of Gainsthorpe, where Roman coins and traces of pavement have been found. It is said that this hamlet was uprooted by men of the neighbouring villages, as it had become a mere nest of highwaymen preying upon travellers on the lonely road."

In 1885 Kellys documented Wesleyan and Primitive Methodist chapels, and an 1874-built board school. Principal landowners were the Duke of St Albans and Sir Hugh Arthur Henry Cholmeley. Agricultural production of the parish was chiefly wheat barley and turnips.

== Church ==
Hibaldstow Grade II listed Anglican church is dedicated to St Hybald. In 1885 Kelly’s noted a church of Early English style consisting of chancel with vestry, nave of 4 bays, a north aisle and a west tower with 3 bells. The chancel was rebuilt in 1866, and the nave in 1876–77 by Fowler of Louth; during the latter rebuilding the original tower fell, only being added back in 1958–60 with a pyramid roof with Perpendicular style details by Lawrence Bond. The octagonal font is also of Perpendicular style, and the chalice cover, paten and flagon are by John Jackson from 1698.

Cox stated: "When the chancel was being rebuilt in 1864, an early stone coffin with the skeleton of a man of powerful frame and a crozier [apparently of Saxon date – Kellys] came to light. Quite possibly these may have been the remains of St Hibald. Hibald was an abbot, probably of Bardney, and is mentioned by Bede. To him are also dedicated the neighbouring churches of Scawby and Manton".

== Other Hibaldstow listed buildings ==
- The Vicarage – 1851–52 dwelling on Brigg Road.
- Hibaldstow Bridge – bridge built in 1889 on South Carr Road, replacing an earlier timber swing-bridge.
- Hibaldstow Mill mill pond walls and wheel race – 1802 windmill and watermill with dwelling on Ings Lane.
- Hibaldstow Mill buildings and culvert – 1802 culvert and outbuildings on Ings Lane.
- Beechwood – early to middle 19th-century house on East Street
- Beechwood Farmhouse – early 19th-century farmhouse on East Street.
- The White Cottage – late 17th- to early 18th-century cottage on West Street, previously a farmhouse.
- Willow Farmhouse and outbuilding – mid-18th-century farmhouse and an outbuilding on East Street.
- Lime Kiln – middle to late 19th-century kiln on Gainsthorpe Road.
- Signal Box – 1880 timber signal box on Gainsthorpe Road.

== RAF Hibaldstow and Skydiving ==
See RAF Hibaldstow and for the skydiving centre, Skydive Hibaldstow.

== Top Gear Train Crash ==
A local level crossing was the site of a staged train crash carried-out by BBC motoring programme Top Gear in conjunction with Network Rail for their "Level crossings – Don't run the risk campaign", shown on 25 February 2007. It involved a train crashing into a Renault Espace to show the dangers of jumping the red lights at level crossings. The segment was presented by Jeremy Clarkson and the car was completely destroyed by the locomotive. As a result, the line was closed to replace the damaged track.
