= Gainsthorpe =

Deserted medieval village site in Lincolnshire, England

Coordinates: 53.49792°N 0.56031°W

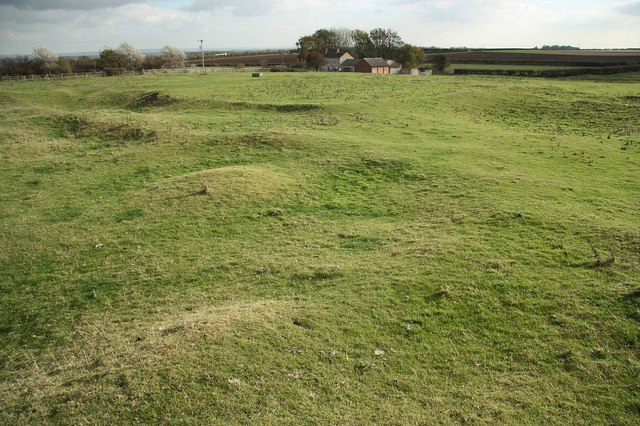
Overview of Gainsthorpe

Gainsthorpe is a deserted medieval village site in a field which is part of the present Gainsthorpe Farm in Lincolnshire, England. The site is in Hibaldstow civil parish located on a minor road west of the A15 road, south of Hibaldstow and five miles (eight kilometres) south-west of Brigg.

It is now in the care of English Heritage. There is a small car park from where a footpath of about 220 yards (200 metres) leads to the site. The typical medieval layout of sunken roads and raised rectangular tofts and crofts is clearly seen in the humps and hollows of the field.
