= Oxton Hall =

House in North Yorkshire, England

Coordinates: 53.8849°N 1.2458°W

Oxton Hall is a grade II listed country house in the town of Oxton, North Yorkshire.

The hall was built in the early 18th century. It is now the home of Samuel Smith, son of Humphrey Smith, and his fiancé Kitty Grubb. Humphrey Smith was the owner and chairman of Samuel Smith Old Brewery, based in nearby Tadcaster. The hall was acquired by Humphrey's grandfather, Samuel Smith, in 1919.

The hall is built of reddish-brown brick with the front in Tadcaster limestone, on a plinth, with a moulded cornice, a low parapet, and a hipped Welsh slate roof. There are two storeys and seven bays, the middle three bays projecting under a pediment. In the centre is a single-storey, tetrastyle Greek Doric portico, a frieze with triglyphs, a modillion cornice and a low parapet. The windows are sashes, those on the ground floor with aprons, and between the upper floor windows are round-headed niches. At the rear is a verandah. It has been grade II listed since 1967.

== See also ==
- Listed buildings in Oxton, North Yorkshire
