= Cleatham Hall =

English stately home in Lincolnshire

Coordinates: 53.50322°N 0.59415°W

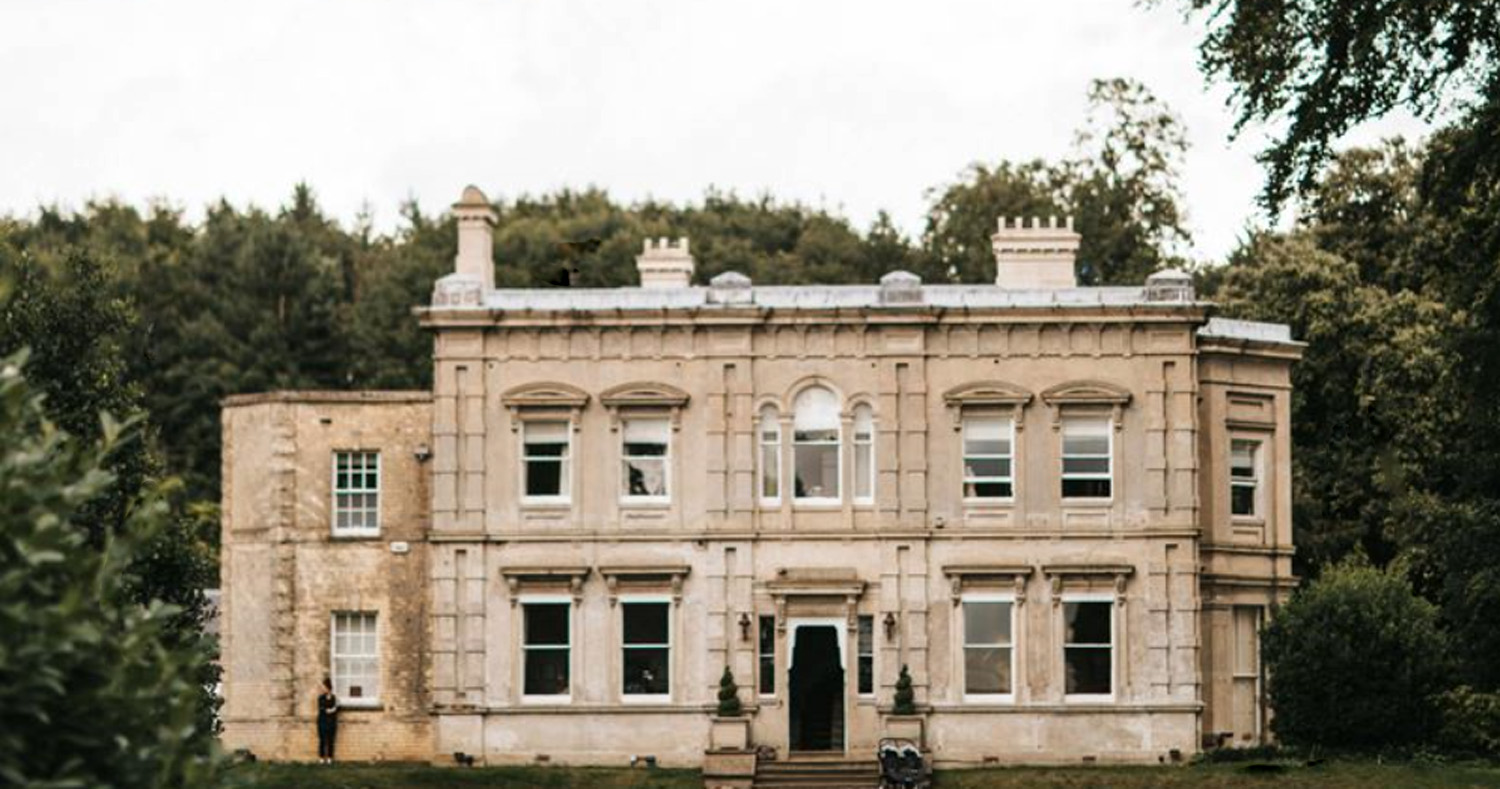
Cleatham Hall

Cleatham Hall is an English country house located near Manton in Lincolnshire, England. The building is of special interest and has a Grade II listing on the National Heritage List for England. The main building was constructed in 1855 but some of it dates back to the 18th and perhaps the 17th century. The Hall was, in its early years, in the ownership of ancestors of Charles Darwin. It is now a boutique hotel and event venue.

== Architecture ==
Cleatham Hall main house dates to 1855; it is south-facing, of 2-stories and 5-bays and is in the Classical Revival style. English Heritage, following Pevsner, speculate that the architect was J. M. Hooker of Tunbridge Wells; the practice of Hooker & Wheeler were responsible for the design of the parish church in nearby Manton, and John Marshall Hooker was the architect of the vicarage. 19th-century sections of the hall are of rendered brick construction, whilst earlier sections are limestone rubble, and later sections in yellow brick.

The hall's central bay is demarcated by full-height pilasters with a central recessed channel. The panelled door and ground-floor sash-windows are surmounted by hoods with moulded cornices supported by carved consoles. First-floor windows are surmounted by pediments, again with cornices and consoles. A string course on brackets divides the stories. The roof is of slate and lead, with brick stacks. The roof-line is defined by a moulded cornice and parapet supported by triglyphs and modillions, and with friezes in panels above the pilasters. The right-side garden elevation is of similar style, and has a full-height canted bay window. The left-side elevation is more plain yellow-brick construction.

The interior features a geometrical stone staircase with slender cast-iron balusters and decorated with moulded cornices and wall-niches. Ground-floor rooms have plaster cornices and ceiling roses, dado rails, and panelled doors, window shutters and shutter boxes.

The hall is sited in a 13 acres (5.3 ha) estate, with a walled-garden to the north, and outbuildings including an 1802 coach-house designed by William Fowler. Nikolaus Pevsner, on his visit, noted that the estate has been "deparked", and comments that Mr. Maw's pre-1855 house was a "Georgian box".

== Early residents ==
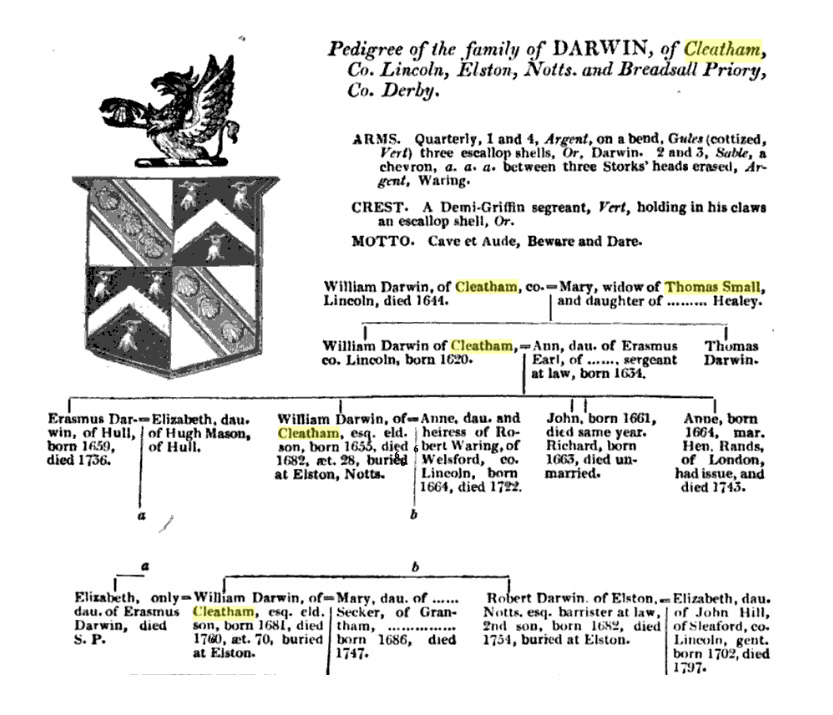
Family tree of the Darwins of Cleatham

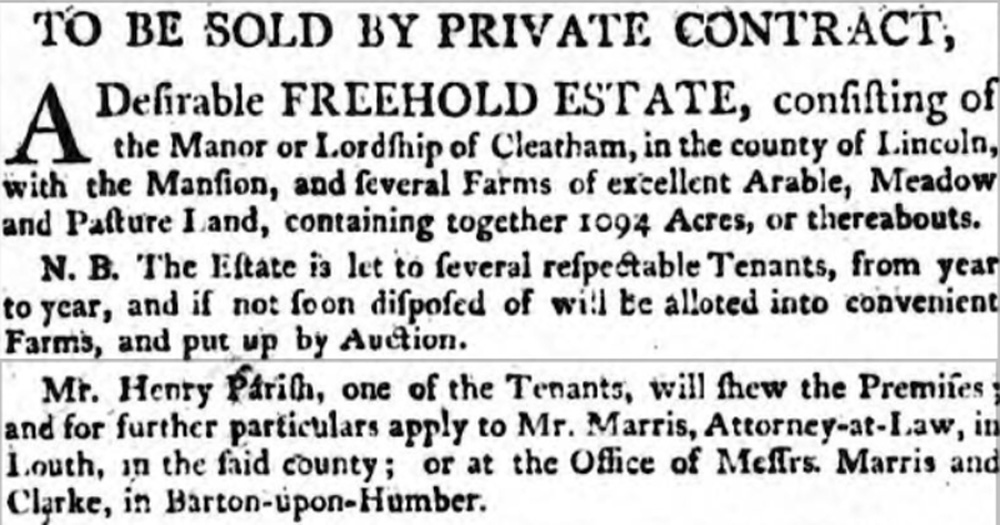
Sale notice for Cleatham Estate in 1800

Charles Darwin mentioned in his writings that his ancestor William Darwin (1575-1644) owned the estate at Cleatham in about 1600. He described him as someone who "considered himself a gentleman, bore arms and married a lady. He was also yeoman of the armoury of Greenwich to James 1 and Charles I." It passed through successive generations of the Darwin family as shown in the pedigree chart. Charles Darwin describes these ancestors in the following terms.

"The second William Darwin (born 1620) served as Captain-Lieutenant in Sir W. Pelham's troop of horse, and fought for the king. His estate was sequestrated by the Parliament, but he was afterwards pardoned on payment of a heavy fine. In a petition to Charles II he speaks of his almost utter ruin from having adhered to the royal cause, and it appears that he had become a barrister. This circumstance probably led to his marrying the daughter of Erasmus Earle, Sergeant-at-law; and hence Erasmus Darwin derived his Christian name.

"The eldest son from this marriage, William (born 1655), married the heiress of Robert Waring, of Wilsford, in the county of Nottingham. This lady also inherited the manor of Elston, which has remained ever since in the family. This third William Darwin had two sons — William, and Robert who was educated as a barrister, and who was the father of Erasmus."

According to Charles Darwin the Cleatham Estate was sold by the Darwin family in 1760. The new owner was Charles Wigelsworth (1716-1783) who was described as "a gentleman". In his Will of 1783 he leaves the house to his eldest son Charles Wigelsworth of Louth who died in 1799. In 1801 it was sold to George and Matthew Maw.

== The Maw family ==
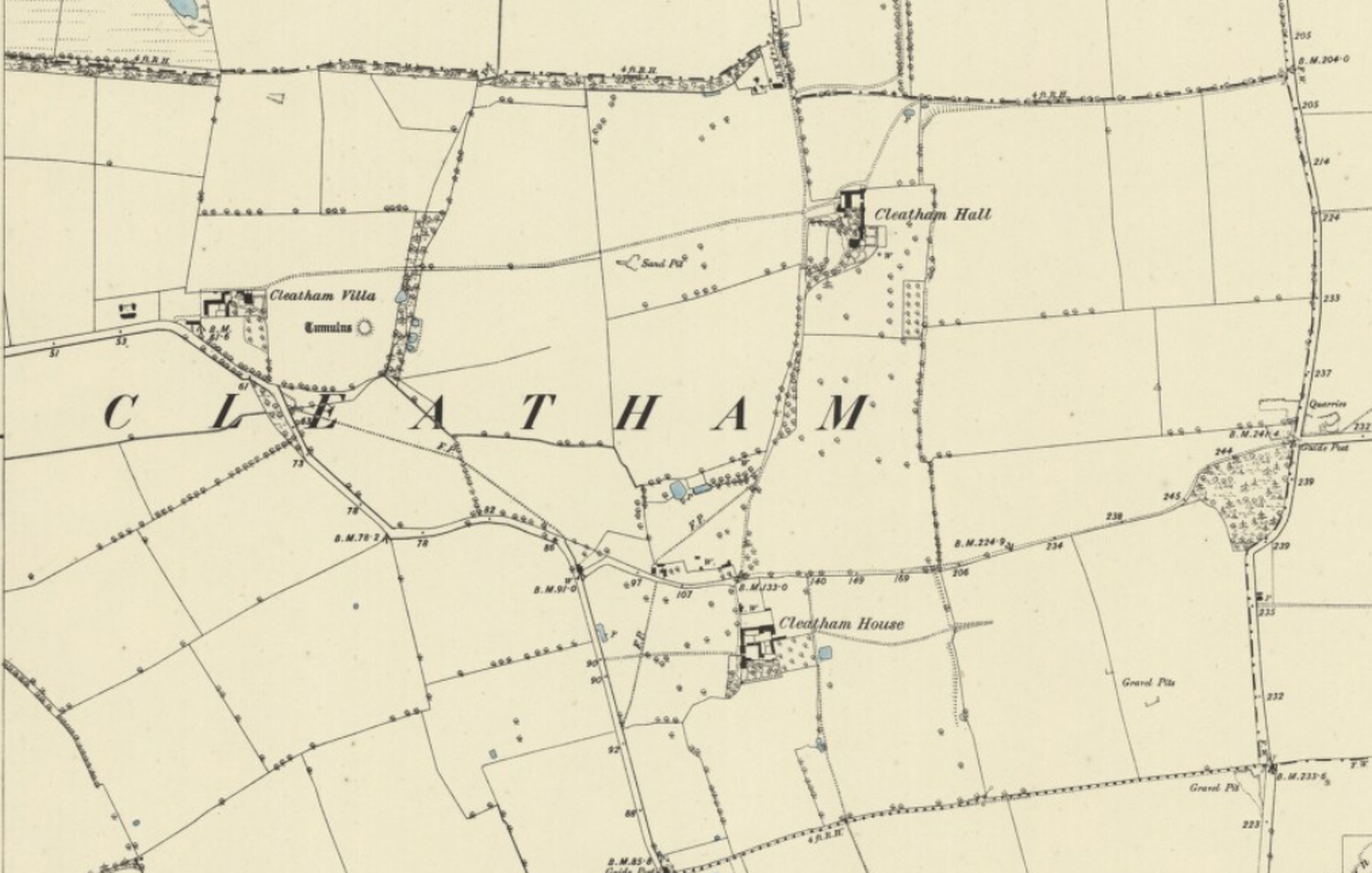
Map Cleatham 1885

George Maw (1754-1829) and Matthew Maw (1746-1816) who bought Cleatham Hall in 1801 were brothers. They both farmed the land for some years and then Matthew who was a bachelor sold his share to his brother George. George and his wife Sarah (née Burwill) lived there for many years with their children. When George died in 1829 he left the property to his son Matthew Maw (1792-1880).

Matthew who did not marry lived at Cleatham for many years and became very wealthy. In 1855 he decided to make substantial alterations and additions to the existing house. The 1871 Census describes him as "a gentleman landowner". His probate record notes that in 1880 he had a personal estate of £140,000 which is £16 million today.

When he died in 1880 he left his property to his nephew Matthew Maw (1824-1901). Matthew was born in 1824 and was the son of William Maw of Bigby. In 1864 he married Alice Mary Seaton (1846-1898) daughter of Reverend Seaton of Colton. When he died in 1901 his eldest son Arthur Matthew Maw (1869-1944) became the owner of Cleatham Hall.

Arthur married in 1892 Lucy Dora Hargreaves Stephenson who was the daughter of John Stephenson of Somerley Brigg. Their youngest son Wing Commander Roger Maw (1906-1992) was famous for the part he played in the escape from the German prisoner of war camp Stalag Luft III in 1943. This incident was immortalised in the book The Wooden Horse by Eric Williams and the subsequent movie of the same name.
