= St John the Baptist's Church, Kirkby Wharfe =

Church in North Yorkshire, England

Coordinates: 53°51′48″N 1°13′55″W

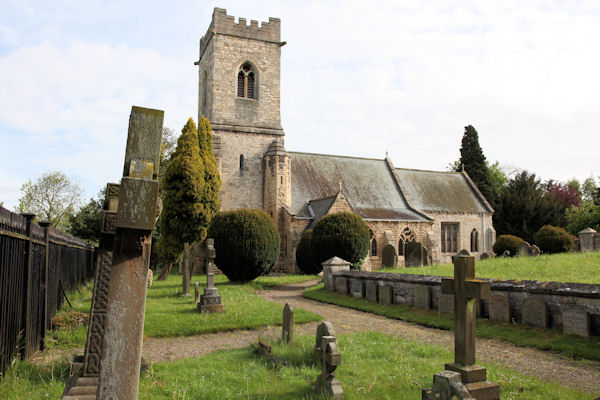
The church, in 2009

St John the Baptist's Church is the parish church of Kirkby Wharfe, a village south-west of Tadcaster, in North Yorkshire, in England.

The church was first built in the late 12th century, with the nave and parts of the south door surviving from this period. A vicarage was built in the 1240s. The church was extended and altered in the 13th and 14th centuries. The vicar was granted funds from Queen Anne's Bounty in 1757, and the church was restored in 1819. The church was again restored in 1860, with the exterior extensively rebuilt, under the patronage of Albert Denison, 1st Baron Londesborough. The church roof was replaced in the 1950s, and in 1967, it was Grade II* listed.

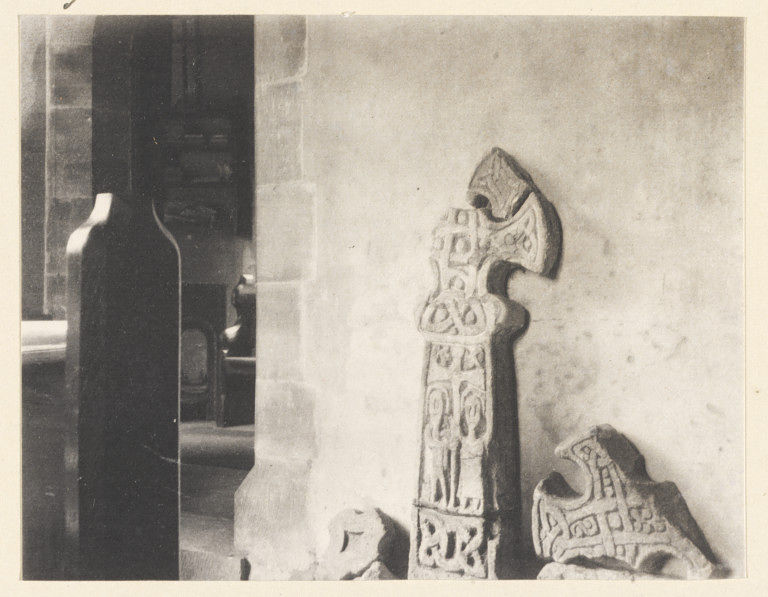
Remains of the 10th-century crosses, seen in 1902

The church is built of Magnesian Limestone and sandstone, with a Welsh slate roof. There is a west tower with two stages, supported by angle buttresses. It has a staircase turret to the south-west, it has lancet windows and Perpendicular windows above, and the tower is topped by battlements and gargoyles. The nave has three bays, with aisles and a south porch, and there is a two-bay chancel with a north chapel. There are a variety of windows, some original and containing fragments of 15th- and 16th-century glass, and others dating from the 1860 restoration. The priest's door to the chancel has a Tudor arch. Inside, there are round piers supporting pointed arches to the aisles, and the tower and chancel arches are also pointed. The font is Norman, and there is a 16th-century pierced screen in the north chapel. There are parts of three 10th-century crosses, and there is an early-19th century memorial depicting the Adoration of the Magi.

== See also ==
- Grade II* listed churches in North Yorkshire (district)
- Listed buildings in Kirkby Wharfe with North Milford
