= Listed buildings in Oxton, North Yorkshire =

Oxton is a civil parish in the county of North Yorkshire, England. It contains two listed buildings that are recorded in the National Heritage List for England. Both the listed buildings are designated at Grade II, the lowest of the three grades, which is applied to "buildings of national importance and special interest". The parish contains the village of Oxton and the surrounding countryside, and the listed buildings consist of a country house and a smaller house.

== Buildings ==
| Name and location | Photograph | Date | Notes |
|---|---|---|---|
| Oxton Hall; 53.88495°N 1.24581°W | — | Early 18th century | A small country house that has been altered and extended. It is in reddish-brown brick with the front in Tadcaster limestone, on a plinth, with a moulded cornice, a low parapet, and a hipped Welsh slate roof. There are two storeys and seven bays, the middle three bays projecting under a pediment. In the centre is a single-storey, tetrastyle Greek Doric portico, a frieze with triglyphs, a modillion cornice and a low parapet. The windows are sashes, those on the ground floor with aprons, and between the upper floor windows are round-headed niches. At the rear is a verandah. |
| Oxton Grange; 53.88156°N 1.23349°W | | Mid-18th century (probable) | The house is in rendered brick with stone dressings, quoins, a modillion eaves band, and a Welsh slate roof. There are two storeys, three bays, and a rear range. In the centre is a Doric porch with a pediment, and the doorway has a fanlight. On the ground floor are canted bay windows, and the other windows are sashes, one horizontally-sliding. |
