= Oaten pipe =

Oaten pipe (fingerholed)
Woodwind instrument
- Classification: single-reed aerophone
- Hornbostel–Sachs classification: 422.211.2 (single reed instrument with cylindrical bore and fingerholes)

Oaten pipe (without fingerholes)
Woodwind instrument
- Classification: single-reed aerophone
- Hornbostel–Sachs classification: 422.211.1 (single reed instrument with cylindrical bore without fingerholes)
- Inventor(s): (Folk instrument)

Related instruments
- clarinet, lincolnshire bagpipes, diplica, dili tuiduk, launeddas, pastoral pipes, Reclam de xeremies, practice chanter, sipsi, zummara

The oaten pipe are a rare type of English and Scottish reedpipe made from the straw (dried stalks) of the oat plant or similar natural materials, commonly associated with pastoral culture. An 1898 dictionary described the instrument as "The simplest form of a reed pipe, a straw with a strip cut to form the reed, at the end closed by the knot". Similar instruments are made across a variety of cultures, while the specific term "oaten pipe" is found in English literature, connoting pastoral imagery.

Some records describe the "oaten pipe" as simply a noisemaker or bird-call, while others specify that it had several fingerholes for playing a melody. Scottish musicologists noted that oaten pipes served as a musical toy for boys, with the possibility of being a practice instrument (an improvised practice chanter) for later playing the bagpipes.

== See also ==
- Lincolnshire bagpipe
