= Grimston Park =

Country house in North Yorkshire, England

Coordinates: 53.8647°N 1.2436°W

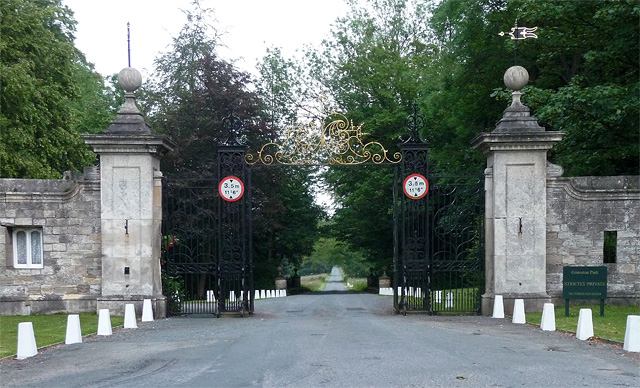
Main gates to Grimston Park

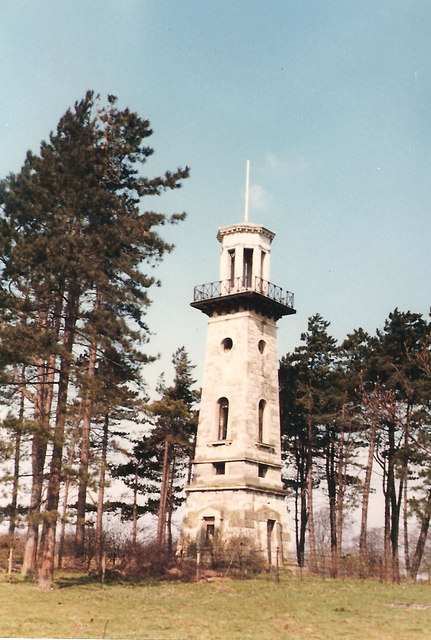
Water tower, Grimston Park

Grimston Park is a grade II* listed Georgian country house in Grimston, North Yorkshire, England, some 1.7 miles (3 km) south of Tadcaster. Since being owned by the Fielden family, it has been converted into a number of luxury homes.

The house is built on two storeys of Tadcaster limestone ashlar with a Welsh slate roof. It has a 7-bay frontage with a projecting portico, and a three-storey tower and a single-storey entrance lodge at each end. A limestone tower in the grounds, designed like the house by Decimus Burton, is also grade II listed.

== History ==
In the early 1600s the Grimston estate belonged to the Stanhope family. King James I and subsequently Anne of Denmark stayed at Grimston in 1603 on the way south to accept the throne of England. After some expensive litigation between members of the family over its ownership it passed to the Gascoignes of Parlington Hall, Aberford.

The estate and its previous building were bought in 1812 by John Francis Cradock, 1st Baron Howden. After his death it passed to his son John Hobart Caradoc, 2nd Baron Howden who had served in the Diplomatic Service in Russia, where he married the Russian princess, Catherine Bagration, the widow of Pyotr Bagration. The second baron commissioned Decimus Burton to rebuild the house in 1839 as an "Italianate palace" with large pleasure grounds and a Riding School. Unfortunately the Howdens divorced after 11 years and the estate was sold in 1851 to fellow diplomat Albert Denison, 1st Baron Londesborough.

The estate, comprising the Hall itself and 600 acres of parkland, together with the outlying farms making up a total of 2875 acres was bought in 1872 for £265,000 by John Fielden, High Sheriff of Yorkshire in 1885 and son of wealthy cotton manufacturer and MP John Fielden, known as "Honest John". He left it on his death in 1893 to his nephew Thomas, MP for Middleton, who died unexpectedly at an early age in 1897. His eldest son, who inherited the estate, was Captain John Fielden, an Eton educated Army cavalry officer. It remains in the Fielden family.

Parts of the land surrounding the house were used by the RAF for military purposes during the Second World War. In 1962, the contents of the house went on the market. There was a sale catalogue in the library 'stacks' in Temple Newsam house up to the mid-1990s which may by now have been rehoused. Fully illustrated, the catalogue showed Grimston Park mansion still in its full country house style. By the mid-1970s, the house was rented by an organisation called 'Historic Productions' and the kitchen was converted to form a 'mediaeval banquet hall'. Local people and students from Leeds College of Music were hired to supply both music and meals. The singing waitresses were decked out in boldly pattern brocade dresses and served 'brose', 'manchet bread' and roast chicken legs. Music consisted of popular late Georgian and Victorian ballads, but the string and keyboard players did their best to introduce some authenticity. At this time, what must have been delightful Italianate gardens to one side of the house, were entirely and genuinely romantically, overgrown. The front lawns and the great iron gates had been well looked after.

The house was sold in 1980 and converted into 11 individual luxury residences, though the adjacent parkland still remains in the ownership of the Fielden family.

== See also ==
- Grade II* listed buildings in North Yorkshire (district)
- Listed buildings in Grimston, Selby
