= Archibald Fletcher (reformer) =

Archibald Fletcher (1741–1828), was a Scottish advocate and "father" of Scottish burgh reform.

Born in the hamlet of Pubil, Glen Lyon in Perthshire, he was the eldest son of Angus Fletcher and Grace MacNaughton.

At the age of 10, Archibald entered the Grammar School of Kenmore in Breadalbane, where he excelled as a scholar. At the age of 13, he was transferred to the High School of Perth. Three years later, he was placed in an apprenticeship in the office of the writer to the signet in Edinburgh. Following this role, he was made a confidential clerk to Lord-advocate Sir James Montgomery.

In 1778 he was chosen, on account of his knowledge of Scottish Gaelic, to negotiate with the M'Cra highlanders, who were refusing to embark from Leith for America.

During this time, the Faculty of Advocates brought forward a resolution that no one above the age of 27 should be admitted a member of their body. Fletcher wrote a pamphlet against the proposal, which led to the withdrawal of the resolution. The pamphlet gained him the friendship of Henry Erskine.

In 1784, when burgh reform was first proposed in Scotland, he became secretary of the Burgh Reform Society and drew up the principal draft of a reform bill submitted to parliament. He was dubbed the 'father of burgh reform,’ both on account of his initiation of the agitation and the skill and energy with which he directed it. In 1787, he was sent as delegate to London by the Scottish burghs to promote the cause, where he gained the friendship of Charles James Fox and other Whig leaders.

In 1790, he was admitted into the Faculty of Advocates. The following year he married Miss Eliza Dawson, daughter of a Yorkshire land surveyor.

Initially, his success at the bar was hindered by his principled political views, but he gradually acquired a considerable practice. He was a supporter of the American war of independence, an abolitionist, and an ardent sympathiser with the French Revolution. He acted without fee as counsel for the political reformer Joseph Gerrald and 'other friends of the people' charged with sedition in 1793, and in 1796 was one of the minority of thirty-eight who opposed the deposition of Henry Erskine, dean of the faculty.

After retiring in 1816, he published a legal opinion on the Convention of Royal Burghs in 1825.

He died on 20 December 1828 at his home, Auchindinny House, near Edinburgh. His friend Lord Brougham described him as 'one of the most upright men that ever adorned the profession, and a man of such stern and resolute firmness in public principle as is very rarely found united with the amiable character which endeared him to private society.'
