= Sturton, North Lincolnshire =

Village in the civil parish of Scawby, North Lincolnshire, England

Coordinates: 53.52869°N 0.540111°W

Sturton
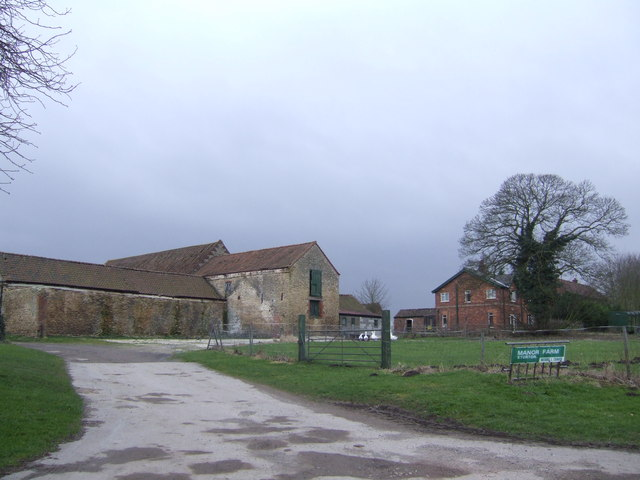
- Manor Farm, Sturton

- Location within Lincolnshire
- OS grid reference: SE970049
  - London: 140 mi (230 km) S
- Unitary authority: North Lincolnshire
- Ceremonial county: Lincolnshire
- Region: Yorkshire and the Humber
- Country: England
- Sovereign state: United Kingdom
- Post town: BRIGG
- Postcode district: DN20
- Police: Humberside
- Fire: Humberside
- Ambulance: East Midlands
- UK Parliament: Gainsborough

Sturton is a village in the civil parish of Scawby, North Lincolnshire, England. It lies 2.5 miles (4.0 km) south-west from Brigg, 0.5 miles (0.8 km) south from Scawby, to which it is conjoined, and 1 mile (1.6 km) south from the M180 on the B1207.

During the 19th century Kelly's Directory noted that Sturton was a hamlet in the parish of Scawby-cum-Sturton, which also included the hamlet of Scawby Brook, 1.5 miles (2.4 km) to the north-east. The railway station for Sturton and Scawby on the Gainsborough to Brigg line lies within Sturton, 0.75 miles (1.2 km) to the south. The station and line was part of the Manchester, Sheffield and Lincolnshire Railway.

Sturton has three Grade II listed farmhouses: c.1849 Station Farmhouse, late 18th-century Home Farmhouse, and late 18th-century Manor Farmhouse.
