= Scawby =

Village and civil parish in North Lincolnshire, England

Coordinates: 53.535740°N 0.540009°W

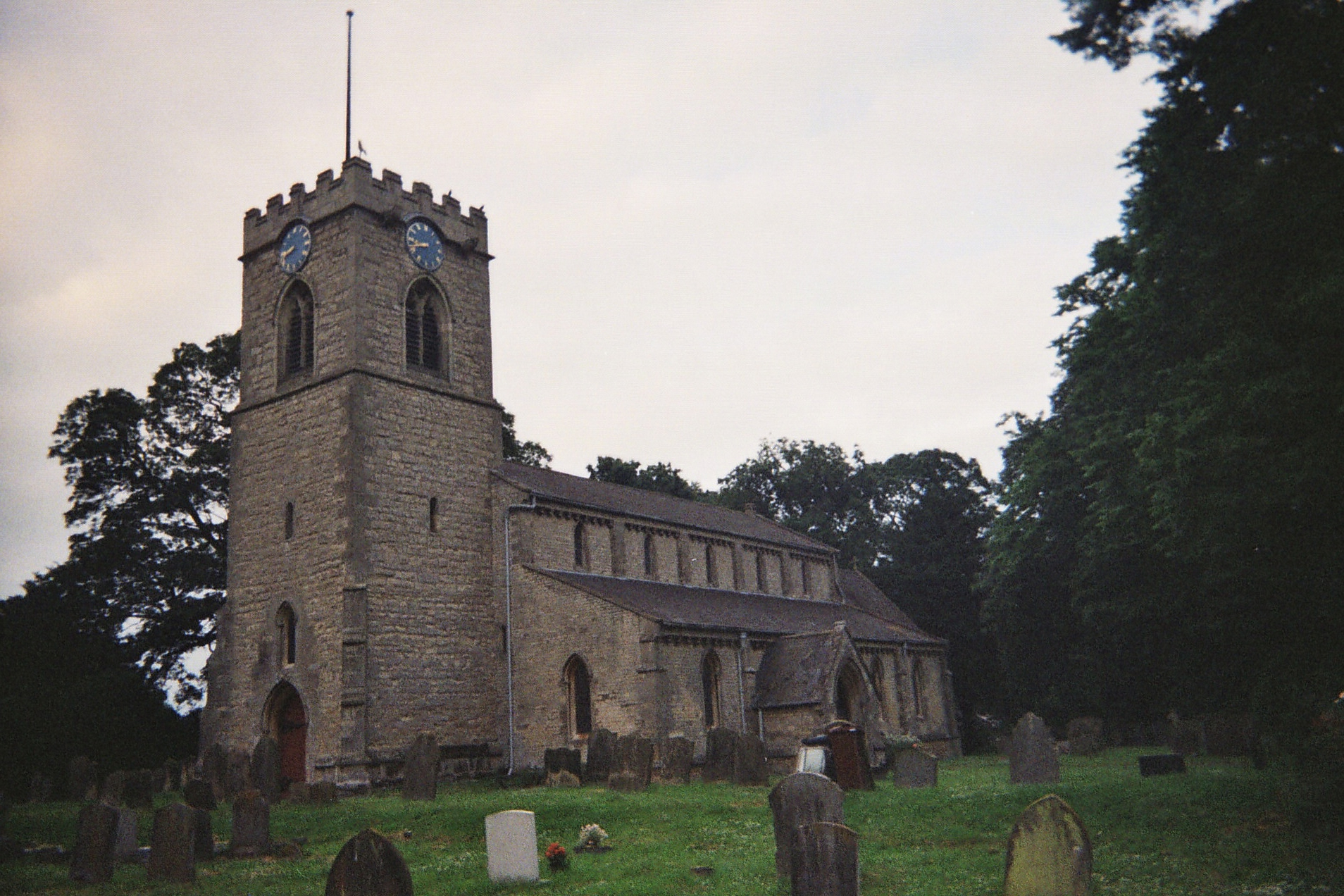
- Church of St Hybald, Scawby

- Location within Lincolnshire
- Population: 2,243 (2011)
- OS grid reference: SE968053
  - London: 145 mi (233 km) S
- Unitary authority: North Lincolnshire
- Ceremonial county: Lincolnshire
- Region: Yorkshire and the Humber
- Country: England
- Sovereign state: United Kingdom
- Post town: BRIGG
- Postcode district: DN20
- Police: Humberside
- Fire: Humberside
- Ambulance: East Midlands
- UK Parliament: Scunthorpe

Scawby is a village and civil parish in North Lincolnshire, England. It is situated 2 miles (3 km) south-west from Brigg, and just east from the A15 road, and south from the M180 motorway. According to the 2001 census, Scawby population (including Sturton) was 2,277, reducing slightly to 2,243 at the 2011 census.

The village is noted for the Nelthorpe family who owned the manor and lived at Scawby Hall. Sir John Nelthorpe founded Brigg Grammar School in 1669. Sturton was formerly a separate hamlet a little to the south of Scawby, but development of the land between the two has incorporated the settlement into the main village. Scawby Brook, situated to the east just outside Brigg, is also partly within the parish. Also in the parish, to the west of the main village, is the roadside hamlet of Greetwell on the B1398 road.

== History ==
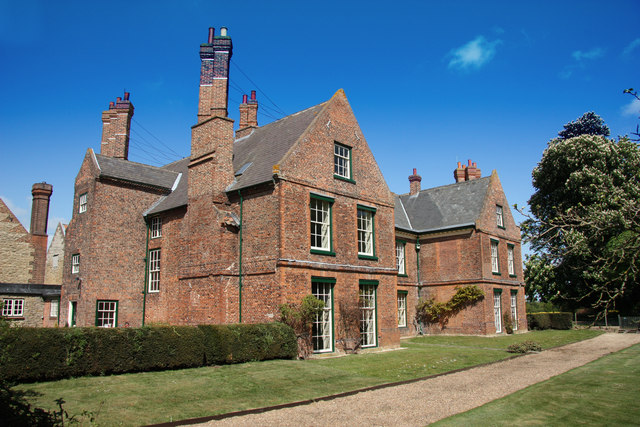
Scawby Hall, an early Jacobean manor house begun in 1605 by Richard Nelthorpe and home to the Nelthorpe family ever since.

Neolithic and Romano-British archaeological finds indicate a long history of habitation. Two mosaic floors of a possible Roman villa were found at Sturton Farm in 1816.

Scawby is mentioned seven times in the Domesday Book of 1086, as "Scallebi" or "Scalebi", with a total of 34 households.

Scawby Hall is thought to date from 1603, with an 18th-century frontage and windows, and 19th-century crenellations.

Scawby Mill, a brick-built tower mill, was opened about 1829, but the present tower was built as part of a house after the original tower collapsed during renovation work in 1994.

Scawby railway station, to the south of the village, opened in 1848, and closed 120 years later. The line is still open.

The church of St Hybald is dedicated to a 7th-century Saxon of that name. It is built in the Early English style, but was substantially rebuilt in 1843 by William Adams Nicholson, and in 1870 by James Fowler of Louth. The tower is original, of the 15th century, with 13th-century work at the base.

There was a Methodist chapel in the village until August 2012. The Barton and Brigg circuit still operates a chapel in nearby Hibaldstow.

== Community ==
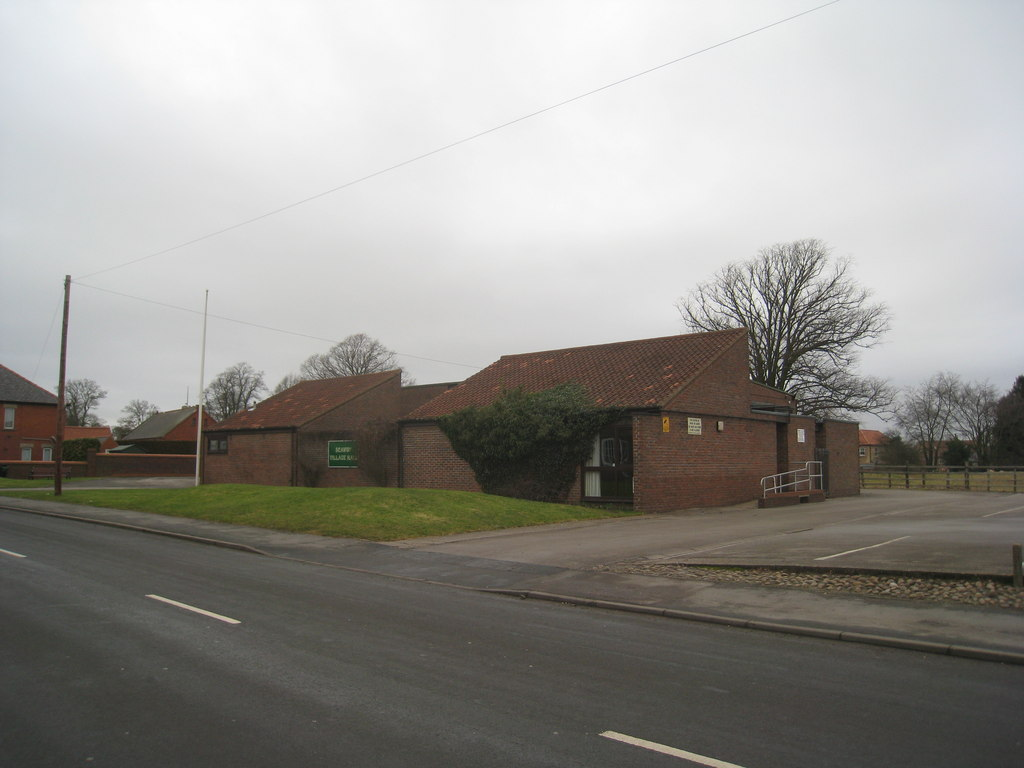
The village hall, built in 1972

An old school building is next to the church. There is a village pump, telephone box, a post office and village shop, a primary school, the Sutton Arms public house, a fish and chip shop and a hairdresser.

Scawby bus connections are to Brigg and Scunthorpe.

The ecclesiastical parish is Scawby and Redbourne, part of the Scawby, Redbourne and Hibaldstow group of the Deanery of Yarborough.

The village hall committee dates back to March 1921, when it was agreed to purchase a hut for community use in the village. In 1967 this was replaced by a brick building with views of open countryside.

Scawby is home to local Quiz team "Dobbin" who defeated The Eggheads in 2011.
