= Oxton, North Yorkshire =

Village and civil parish in North Yorkshire, England

Coordinates: 53°52′54″N 1°14′06″W

Oxton
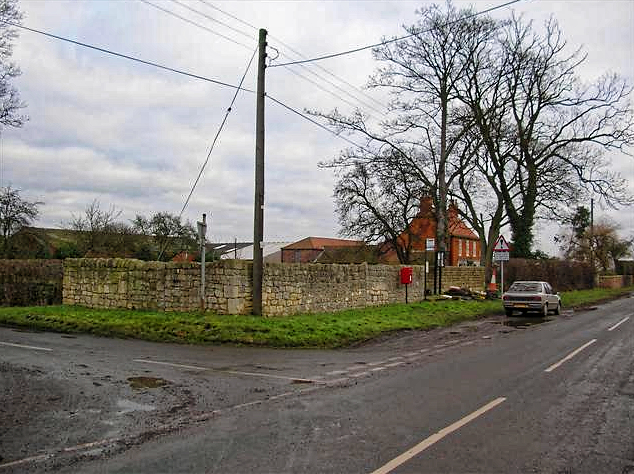
- The junction of Oxton Lane with Spicer Lane

- Location within North Yorkshire
- Area: 3.42 km^{2} (1.32 sq mi)
- Population: 20 (2001 census)
  - Density: 6/km^{2} (16/sq mi)
- OS grid reference: SE502432
- Civil parish: Oxton
- Unitary authority: North Yorkshire
- Ceremonial county: North Yorkshire
- Region: Yorkshire and the Humber
- Country: England
- Sovereign state: United Kingdom
- Post town: TADCASTER
- Postcode district: LS24
- Dialling code: 01937
- Police: North Yorkshire
- Fire: North Yorkshire
- Ambulance: Yorkshire

Oxton is a village and civil parish in North Yorkshire, England, and about 8 miles (13 km) south-west from the county town and city of York. The parish touches Bolton Percy, Grimston, Kirkby Wharfe with North Milford, Steeton and Tadcaster. In 2001 the parish had a population of 20.

The name "Oxton" means 'Ox farm/settlement', and was recorded in the Domesday Book as "Ositone". The lord of the manor in 1086 was Osbern D'Arques, who had received the manor of a 2 ploughlands area from the 1066 lord Alwin, and who was also tenant-in-chief to king William I. Also listed within Oxton is Ouston Farm, of 2 ploughlands and a meadow of 4 acres (1.6 hectares), which was under the lordship of Toki, son of Auti in 1066, and which passed to Fulco, son of Rainfrid in 1086 under William de Percy, the tenant-in-chief to William. Within the parish is the deserted medieval village of Oulston.

Oxton was formerly a township in the parish of Tadcaster, and in 1866 became a civil parish in its own right. From 1974 to 2023 it was part of the Selby District, it is now administered by the unitary North Yorkshire Council.

There are two Grade II listed buildings in Oxton, the mid-18th-century Oxton Grange, and the early 18th-century Oxton Hall.

== See also ==
- Listed buildings in Oxton, North Yorkshire
