= Hybald =

Saint Hybald

Saint
- Born: c. 664
- Died: c. 690 (aged 25–26); Hibaldstow, Lincolnshire, England
- Venerated in: Catholic Church; Eastern Orthodox Church
- Canonized: Pre-Congregation
- Major shrine: Hibaldstow (destroyed & rebuilt)
- Feast: 18 September; 14 December (Orthodox)

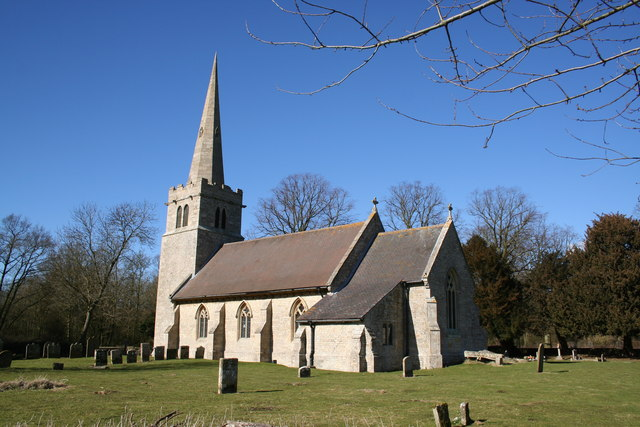
St Hybald's church, Ashby de la Launde

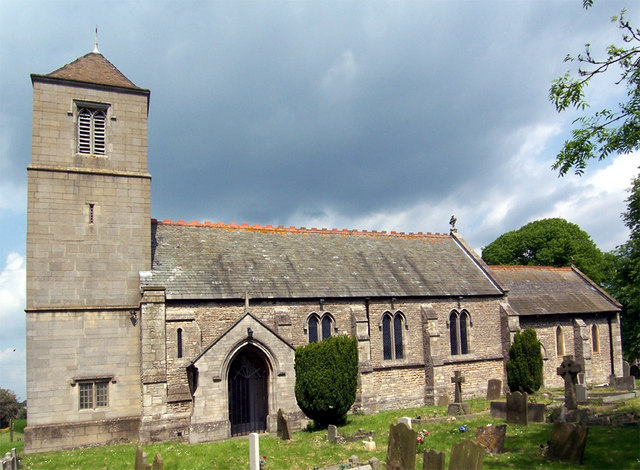
St Hybald's church, Hibaldstow

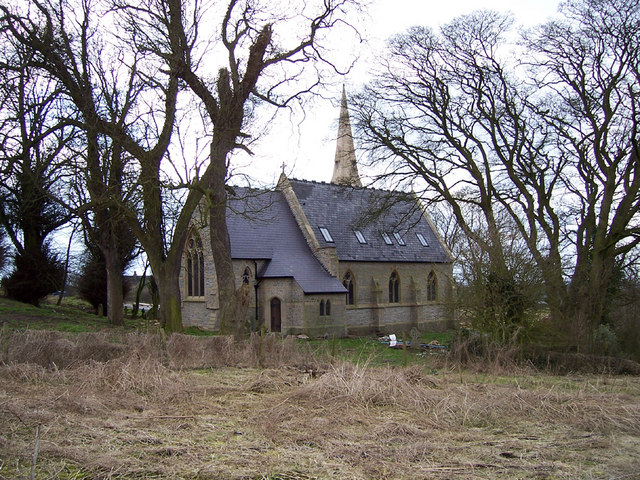
St Hybald's church, Manton

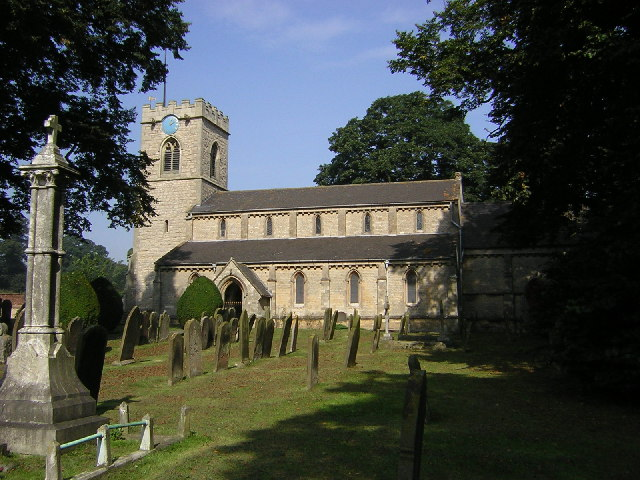
St Hybald's church, Scawby

Saint Hybald (fl. c. 664 – c. 690), (Note: Hybald was a follower of Saint Chad, who died in 664. Hybald died around 690.) also known as Higbald, Hibald or Hygbald, was a 7th-century Anglo-Saxon saint. His feastdays are 18 September and 14 December (Orthodox).

== Life and legacy ==
The Venerable Bede, in his Ecclesiastical History, describes St Hybald as a "most holy and continent man who was an abbot in Lindsey". It is conjectured, in the Dictionary of Christian Biography (1877–87), that this is the Benedictine abbey at Bardney, then in the old Kingdom of Lindsey, now Lincolnshire.

In 679, Osthryth, queen of Mercia, sought to move the remains of her uncle, St Oswald, to Bardney, but the monks refused to accept the body because Oswald, as king of Northumbria, had once conquered Lindsey. The remains were locked outside the abbey but the appearance of a mysterious beam of light, that night, led the monks to reconsider.

Hybald was also a friend of Saint Chad, and, had a prophetic vision of his death. He later, followed Chad's example and became a hermit.

Hybald died around 690, and was buried in the village of Hibaldstow, whose name means place where St Hygbald is buried. Following his canonisation, a shrine was built near his grave to hold his relics, and became a place of pilgrimage. This continued until the English Reformation when the shrine was destroyed. Hybald's body remained undisturbed until it was rediscovered in 1864, when, the, then, dilapidated, church, was, rebuilt. (Note: 'When the chancel was built in 1864 an early stone coffin containing the skeleton of a man of powerful frame, and a crozier, came to light. Probably the remains of St.Hibald, who is mentioned by Bede.')

In addition to Hibaldstow, three Lincolnshire churches are dedicated to Hybald at Ashby de la Launde, Manton and Scawby.
