= Manton, Lincolnshire =

Village and civil parish in North Lincolnshire, England

Coordinates: 53.511136°N 0.595155°W

Manton
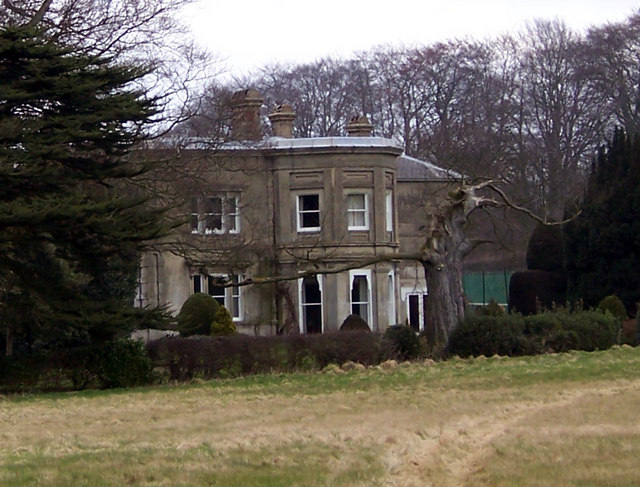
- Cleatham Hall

- Location within Lincolnshire
- Population: 123 (2011)
- OS grid reference: SE932025
  - London: 145 mi (233 km) S
- Civil parish: Manton
- Unitary authority: North Lincolnshire
- Ceremonial county: Lincolnshire
- Region: Yorkshire and the Humber
- Country: England
- Sovereign state: United Kingdom
- Post town: Gainsborough
- Postcode district: DN21
- Police: Humberside
- Fire: Humberside
- Ambulance: East Midlands
- UK Parliament: Scunthorpe

Manton is a village and civil parish in the North Lincolnshire district, in the ceremonial county of Lincolnshire, England. The population of the civil parish at the 2011 census was 123. The village is situated just south from the town of Scunthorpe, and about 6 miles (10 km) south-west from the town of Brigg. The parish includes the hamlet of Cleatham. Cleatham was a civil parish between 1866 and 1936.

== Geography ==
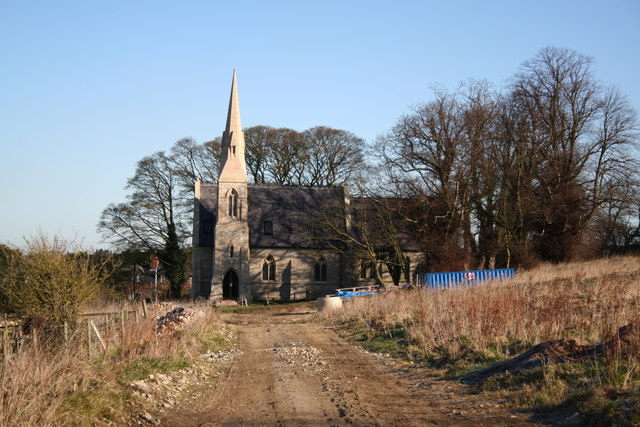
St.Hybald's church, Manton

The parish church is a Grade II listed building dedicated to Saint Hybald. It was built of limestone in 1861 by J. M. Hooker, and Wheeler of Tunbridge Wells.

The church was made redundant by the Diocese of Lincoln in 1998, and it was sold for residential use in 2003. Its parson from 1568 was John Robotham, who was accused of missing evening prayers and even Easter communion in order to play bowls. He had a number of legal battles with parishioners, some of whom he served a summons on during church services.

Cleatham Hall is a Grade II listed house dating from 1855 but with earlier origins.

Cleatham bowl barrow is a Bronze Age scheduled monument located about 200 yards (200 m) to the east of Cleatham Hall.

== History ==
The last known player of the Lincolnshire bagpipes, John Hunsley, lived in Manton in the mid-1800s.

=== Darwin family ===
William Darwin (1655–1682, Charles Darwin's great-great-grandfather) was from Cleatham and married Anne Waring (1664–1722) of Elston in 1680, and moved to Elston. His son would be Robert Darwin (1682–1754), Charles Darwin's great-grandfather.
