= Yorkshire and the Humber =

Region of England

- Region
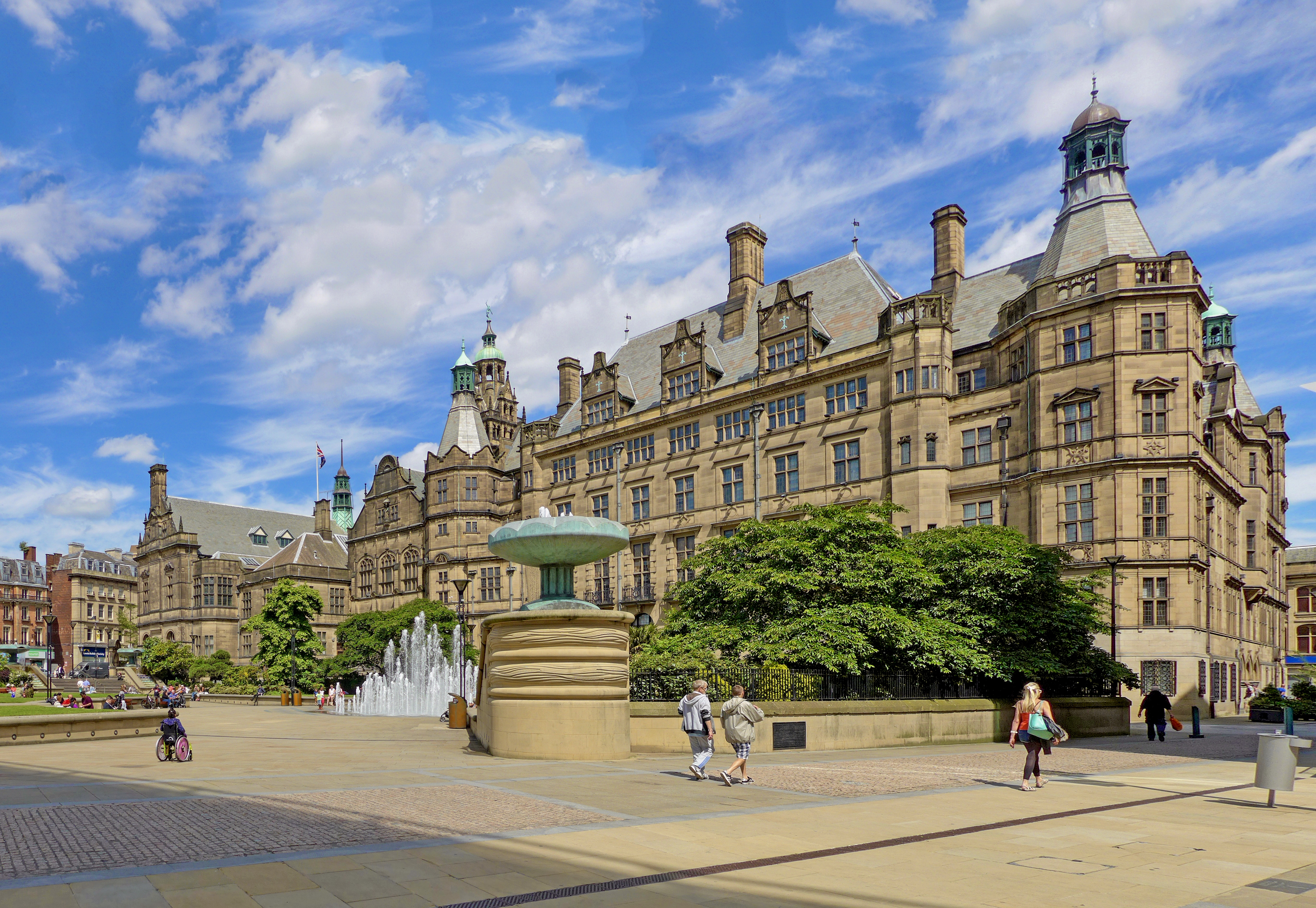
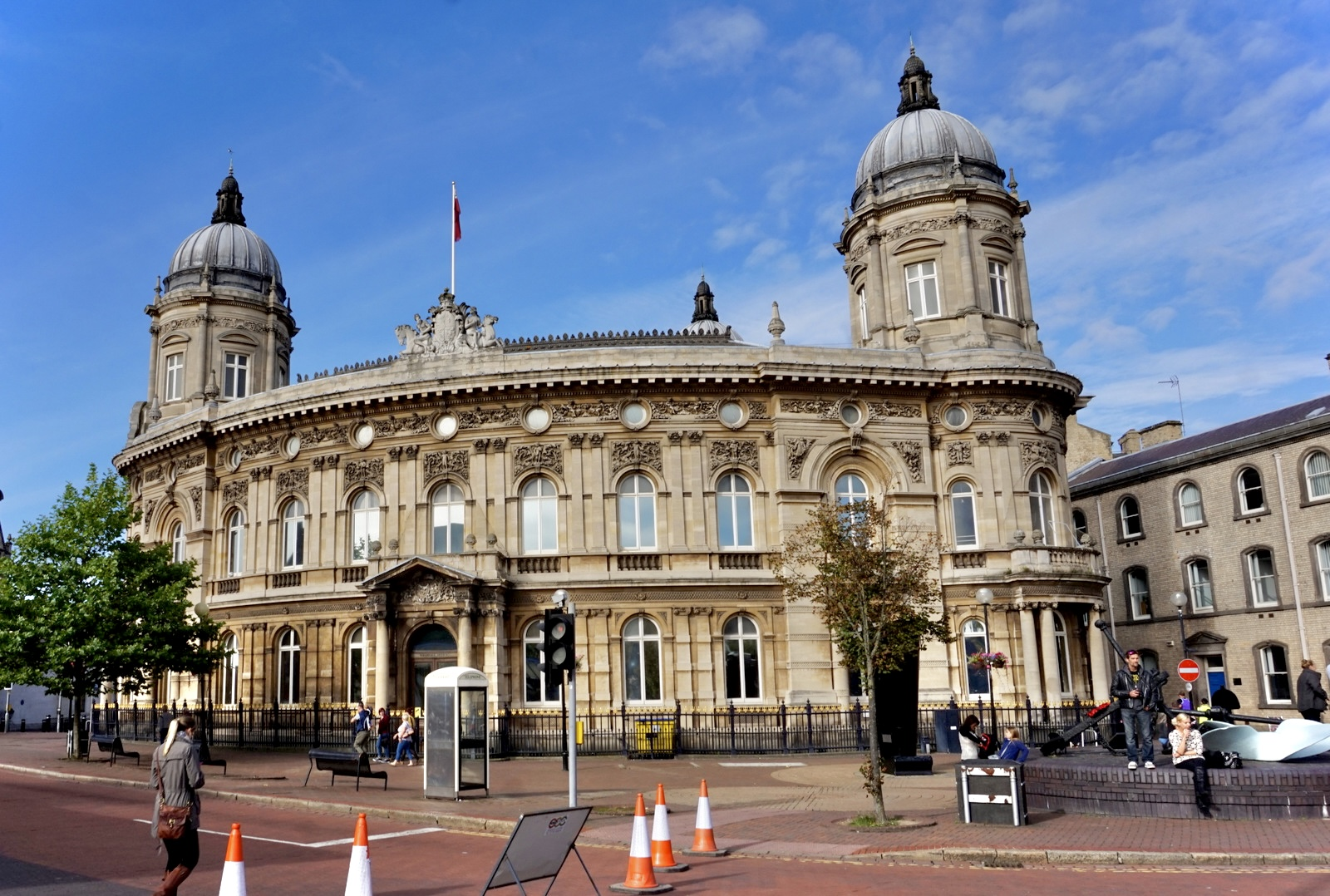
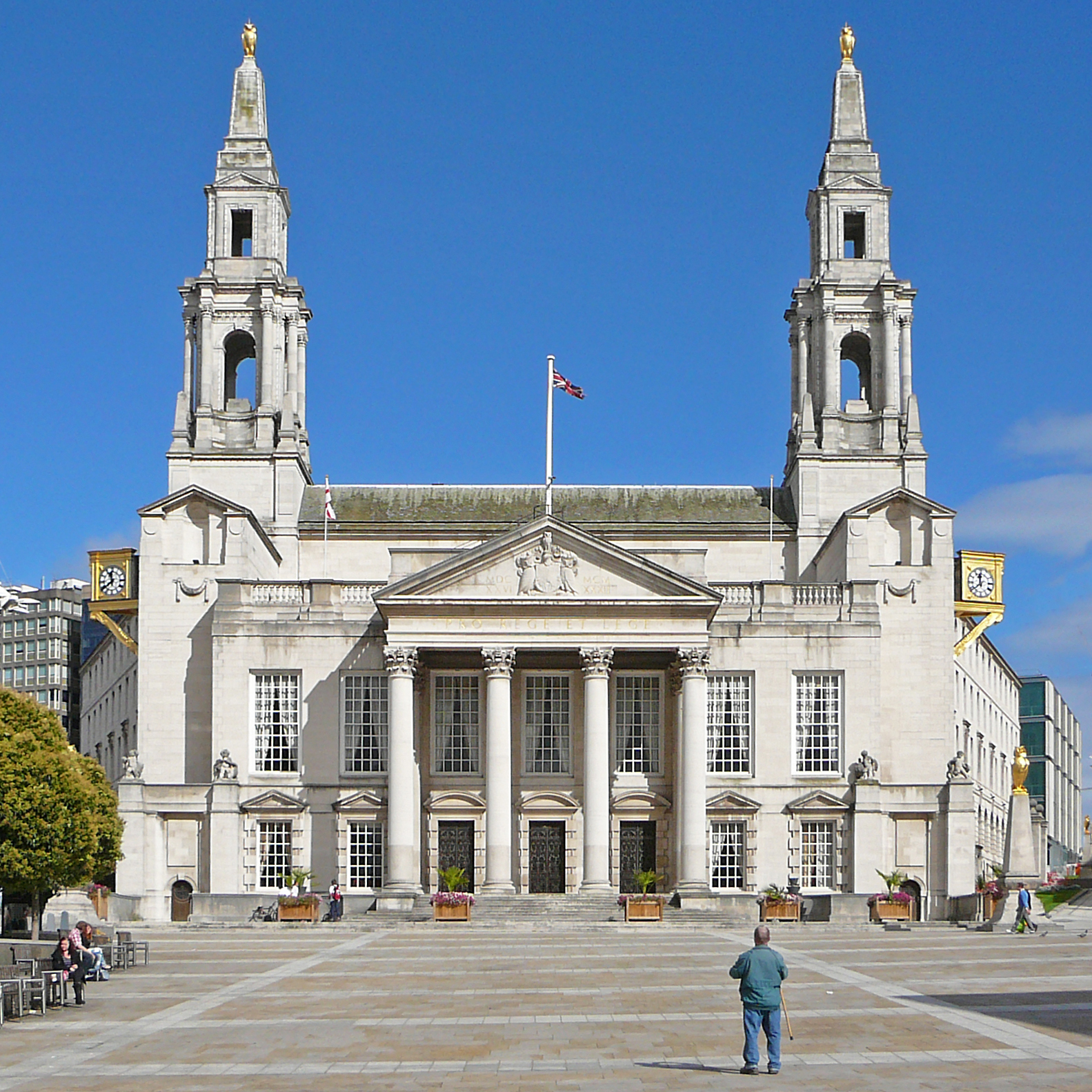
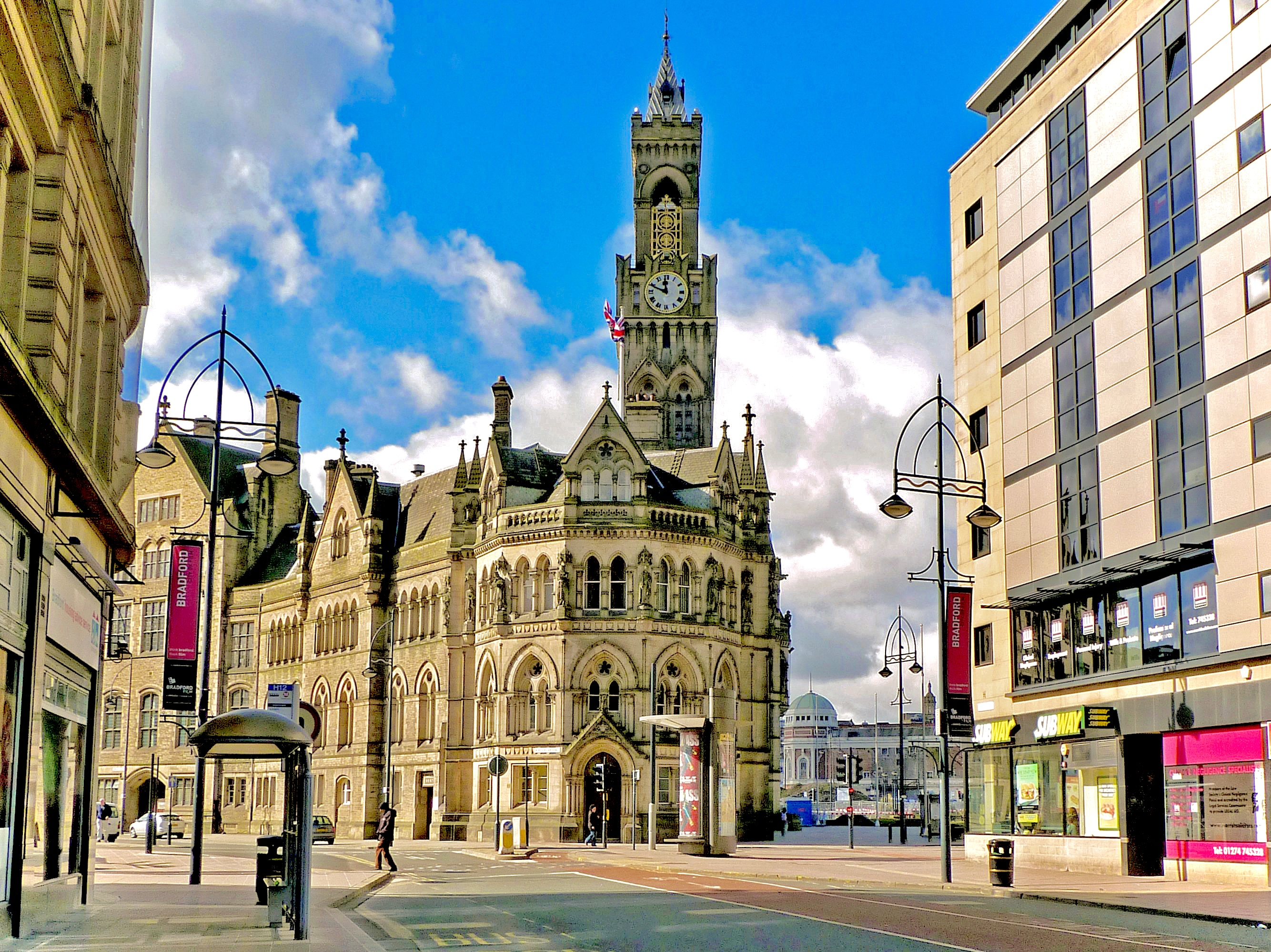
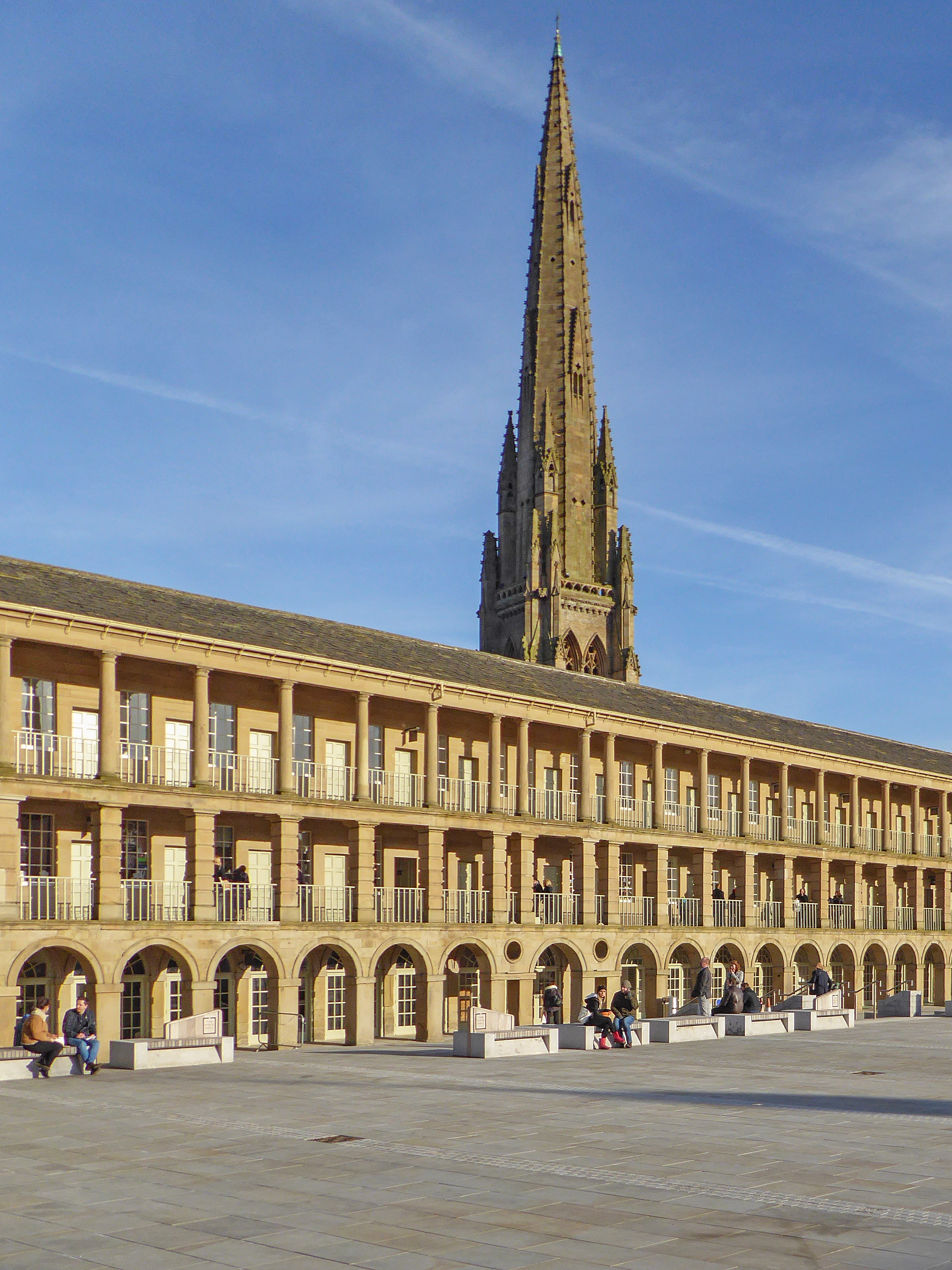
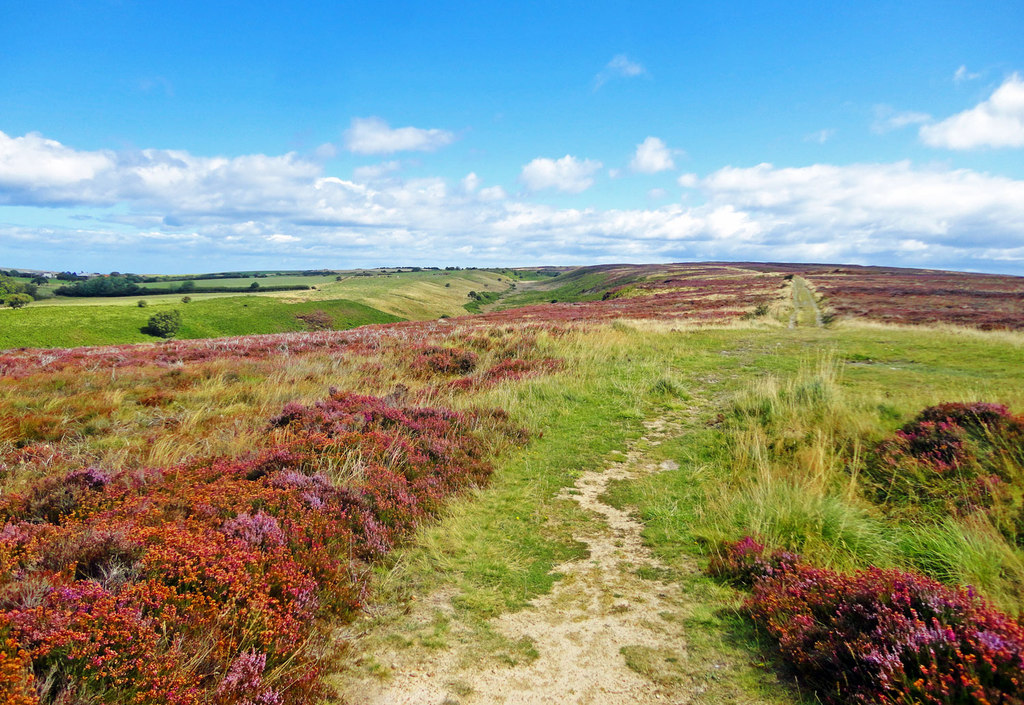
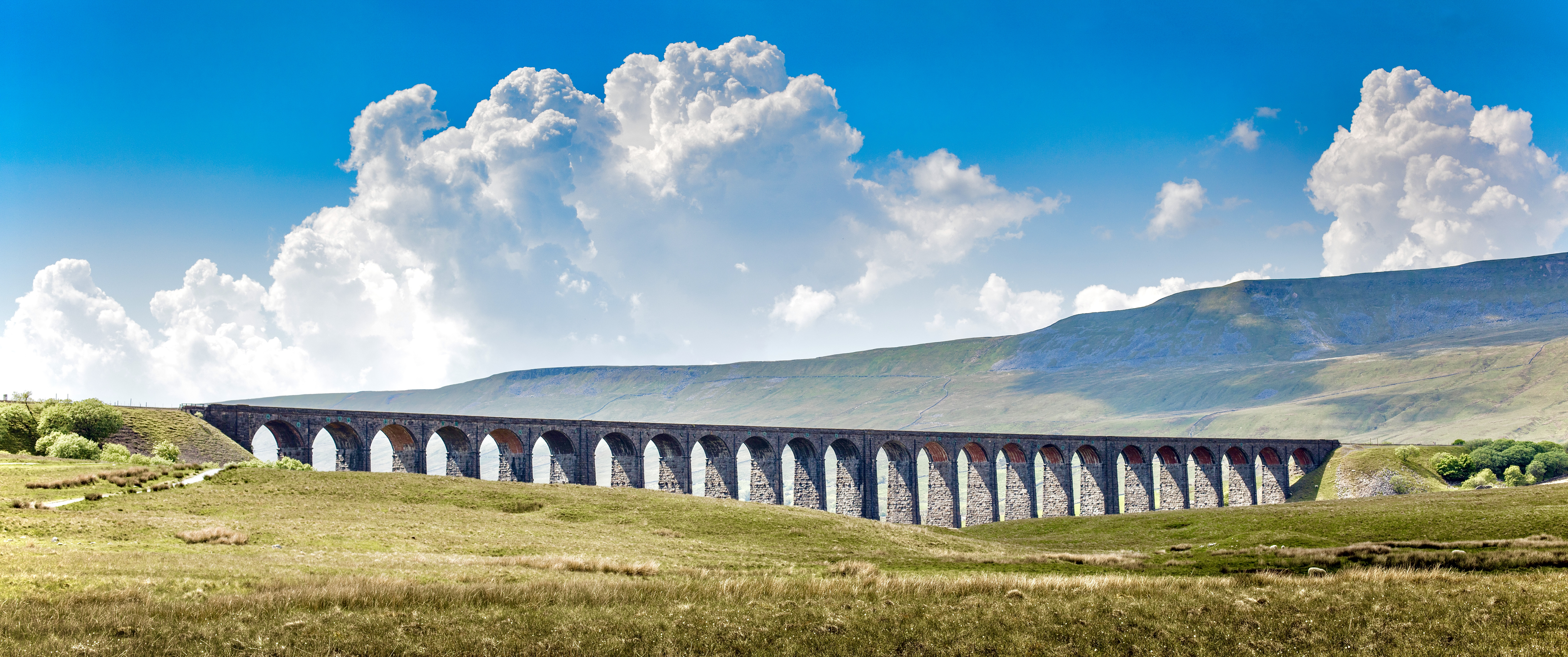
- From top, left to right: Sheffield; Hull; Leeds; Bradford; Piece Hall; The Moors; Ribblehead Viaduct in The Dales

- Yorkshire and the Humber shown within England
- Coordinates: 53°34′N 1°12′W
- Sovereign state: United Kingdom
- Country: England
- GO established: 1994
- RDA established: 1998
- GO abolished: 2011
- RDA abolished: 31 March 2012
- Subdivisions: 5 counties: East Riding of Yorkshire; Lincolnshire (part); North Yorkshire (part); South Yorkshire; West Yorkshire; 5 combined authorities: South Yorkshire; West Yorkshire; York and North Yorkshire; Hull and East Yorkshire; Greater Lincolnshire CCA (part); 15 districts: 6 unitary; 9 metropolitan

Government
  - MPs: 54 MPs (of 650)

Area
  - Total: 6,010 sq mi (15,560 km^{2})
  - Land: 5,948 sq mi (15,404 km^{2})
  - Rank: 5th

Population (2025)
  - Total: 5,672,166
  - Rank: 7th
  - Density: 950/sq mi (368/km^{2})

Ethnicity (2021)
  - Ethnic groups: List: 85.4% White; 8.9% Asian; 2.1% Mixed; 2.1% Black; 1.4% other

Religion (2021)
  - Religion: List: 44.9% Christianity; 39.4% no religion; 8.1% Islam; 0.5% Hinduism; 0.4% Sikhism; 0.3% Buddhism; 0.2% Judaism; 0.4% other; 5.7% not stated
- Time zone: UTC+0 (GMT)
  - Summer (DST): UTC+1 (BST)
- ITL code: TLE
- GSS code: E12000003

Yorkshire and the Humber is one of the nine official regions of England at the first level of ITL for statistical purposes. (Note: ITL replaced NUTS and followed the same definitions of its predecessor until 2023) It is one of the three regions covering Northern England, alongside the North West England and North East England regions, and covers the historic and cultural Yorkshire area.

Yorkshire and the Humber is made up of the counties of East Riding of Yorkshire, North Yorkshire (excluding areas in the Tees Valley which are instead part of North East England), South Yorkshire, West Yorkshire, and the districts of North Lincolnshire and North East Lincolnshire from the county of Lincolnshire (with the rest of the county being within the East Midlands). The population of Yorkshire and the Humber in 2021 was 5,480,774 with its largest settlements being Leeds, Sheffield, Bradford, Hull, and York.

== Geographical context ==
=== Geology ===
In the Yorkshire and the Humber region, there is a very close relationship between the major topographical areas and the underlying geology. The Pennine chain of hills in the west is of Carboniferous origin. The central vale is Permo-Triassic. The North York Moors in the north-east of the region are Jurassic in age, while the Yorkshire Wolds and Lincolnshire Wolds to the south east are Cretaceous chalk uplands.

=== Climate ===
This region of England generally has cool summers and relatively mild winters, with the upland areas of the North York Moors and the Pennines experiencing the coolest weather and the Vale of York the warmest. Weather conditions vary from day to day as well as from season to season. The latitude of the area means that it is influenced by predominantly westerly winds with depressions and their associated fronts, bringing with them unsettled and windy weather, particularly in winter. Between depressions, there are often small mobile anticyclones that bring periods of fair weather. In winter anticyclones bring cold dry weather. In summer the anticyclones tend to bring dry, settled conditions which can lead to drought. For its latitude, this area is mild in winter and cooler in summer due to the influence of the Gulf Stream in the northern Atlantic Ocean.

Air temperature varies on a daily and seasonal basis. Cities such as Sheffield, Leeds, and Bradford are generally cooler due to their inland and upland location, while York, Hull, and Wakefield are warmer due to their lowland location. The temperature is usually lower at night; January is the coldest time of the year and July is usually the warmest month.

Snow is not uncommon in the winter, Yorkshire is mostly hilly/mountainous, and the Yorkshire Dales and the Pennines can have extreme snowstorms with high snowdrifts. Inland/upland settlements, such as Skipton or Ilkley, have more snow than coastal towns. Hull and Scarborough have less snow as their weather is moderated by the ocean.

Climate data for settlements in the region:

Climate data for Kingston upon Hull: Average maximum and minimum temperatures, and average rainfall recorded between 1991 and 2020 by the Met Office.
Month	Jan	Feb	Mar	Apr	May	Jun	Jul	Aug	Sep	Oct	Nov	Dec	Year
Mean daily maximum °C (°F)	7.7 (45.9)	8.5 (47.3)	10.8 (51.4)	13.6 (56.5)	16.6 (61.9)	19.5 (67.1)	22.0 (71.6)	21.8 (71.2)	18.9 (66.0)	14.7 (58.5)	10.6 (51.1)	7.9 (46.2)	14.4 (57.9)
Mean daily minimum °C (°F)	2.1 (35.8)	2.2 (36.0)	3.4 (38.1)	5.1 (41.2)	7.7 (45.9)	10.5 (50.9)	12.7 (54.9)	12.5 (54.5)	10.5 (50.9)	7.8 (46.0)	4.6 (40.3)	2.4 (36.3)	6.85 (44.33)
Average precipitation mm (inches)	54.3 (2.14)	47.6 (1.87)	43.3 (1.70)	47.5 (1.87)	48.3 (1.90)	69.7 (2.74)	61.3 (2.41)	64.6 (2.54)	61.3 (2.41)	66.4 (2.61)	68.2 (2.69)	60.4 (2.38)	693.4 (27.30)
Average precipitation days (≥ 1.0 mm)	11.7	10.4	9.8	9.5	9.3	9.8	9.7	10.1	9.1	11.2	12.6	11.7	124.8
Mean monthly sunshine hours	55.4	79.0	117.6	159.1	200.1	189.3	197.0	183.2	147.3	109.2	65.7	55.3	1,558.7
Source: Met Office

Climate data for Leeds
Month	Jan	Feb	Mar	Apr	May	Jun	Jul	Aug	Sep	Oct	Nov	Dec	Year
Mean daily maximum °C (°F)	5.8 (42.4)	5.9 (42.6)	8.7 (47.7)	11.3 (52.3)	15.0 (59.0)	18.2 (64.8)	19.9 (67.8)	19.9 (67.8)	17.3 (63.1)	13.4 (56.1)	8.8 (47.8)	6.7 (44.1)	12.6 (54.6)
Mean daily minimum °C (°F)	0.3 (32.5)	0.2 (32.4)	1.6 (34.9)	3.1 (37.6)	5.5 (41.9)	8.5 (47.3)	10.4 (50.7)	10.5 (50.9)	8.7 (47.7)	6.3 (43.3)	2.9 (37.2)	1.2 (34.2)	4.9 (40.9)
Average rainfall mm (inches)	61 (2.4)	45 (1.8)	52 (2.0)	48 (1.9)	54 (2.1)	54 (2.1)	51 (2.0)	65 (2.6)	57 (2.2)	55 (2.2)	57 (2.2)	61 (2.4)	660 (25.9)

Climate data for Sheffield
Month	Jan	Feb	Mar	Apr	May	Jun	Jul	Aug	Sep	Oct	Nov	Dec	Year
Mean daily maximum °C (°F)	6.4 (43.5)	6.7 (44.1)	9.3 (48.7)	11.8 (53.2)	15.7 (60.3)	18.3 (64.9)	20.8 (69.4)	20.6 (69.1)	17.3 (63.1)	13.3 (55.9)	9.2 (48.6)	7.2 (45.0)	13.1 (55.6)
Mean daily minimum °C (°F)	1.6 (34.9)	1.6 (34.9)	3.1 (37.6)	4.4 (39.9)	7.0 (44.6)	10.0 (50.0)	12.4 (54.3)	12.1 (53.8)	10.0 (50.0)	7.2 (45.0)	4.2 (39.6)	2.6 (36.7)	6.4 (43.5)
Average precipitation mm (inches)	86.5 (3.41)	63.4 (2.50)	67.9 (2.67)	62.5 (2.46)	55.5 (2.19)	66.7 (2.63)	51.0 (2.01)	63.5 (2.50)	64.3 (2.53)	73.9 (2.91)	77.7 (3.06)	91.9 (3.62)	824.7 (32.47)
Source: The Met Office

Climate data for York
Month	Jan	Feb	Mar	Apr	May	Jun	Jul	Aug	Sep	Oct	Nov	Dec	Year
Mean daily maximum °C (°F)	6 (43)	7 (45)	10 (50)	13 (55)	16 (61)	19 (66)	21 (70)	21 (70)	18 (64)	14 (57)	10 (50)	7 (45)	14 (56)
Mean daily minimum °C (°F)	1 (34)	1 (34)	2 (36)	4 (39)	7 (45)	10 (50)	12 (54)	12 (54)	10 (50)	7 (45)	4 (39)	2 (36)	6 (43)
Average precipitation mm (inches)	59 (2.3)	46 (1.8)	37 (1.5)	41 (1.6)	50 (2.0)	50 (2.0)	62 (2.4)	68 (2.7)	55 (2.2)	56 (2.2)	65 (2.6)	50 (2.0)	639 (25.3)
Source: BBC Weather

== Local government ==
The official region consists of the following subdivisions:

Key
(UA) unitary authority	(MC) metropolitan county	(CA) combined authority

Ceremonial county	Council area	Cities/towns
East Riding of Yorkshire	East Riding of Yorkshire (UA)	Towns of Beverley, Bridlington, Driffield, Goole, Hedon, Hessle, Hornsea, Howden, Market Weighton, Pocklington, Snaith and Withernsea
East Riding of Yorkshire	Kingston upon Hull (UA)	City of Hull
North Yorkshire (part only)	North Yorkshire (UA)	City of Ripon as well as the towns of Harrogate, Scarborough, Northallerton, Knaresborough, Selby, Skipton, Whitby and Filey
North Yorkshire (part only)	York (UA)	City of York as well as the town of Haxby.
Lincolnshire (part only)	North Lincolnshire (UA)	Towns of Scunthorpe, Barton-upon-Humber and Brigg
Lincolnshire (part only)	North East Lincolnshire (UA)	Towns of Grimsby and Cleethorpes
South Yorkshire (also MC and CA)	Sheffield	City of Sheffield as well as the town of Stocksbridge
South Yorkshire (also MC and CA)	Rotherham	Towns of Rotherham, Wath, Maltby and Swinton
South Yorkshire (also MC and CA)	Barnsley	Towns of Barnsley, Hoyland, Penistone and Wombwell
South Yorkshire (also MC and CA)	Doncaster	City of Doncaster as well as the town of Thorne
West Yorkshire (also MC and CA)	Wakefield	City of Wakefield as well as the towns of Castleford, Featherstone, Knottingley, Normanton and Pontefract
West Yorkshire (also MC and CA)	Kirklees	Towns of Huddersfield, Dewsbury and Batley
West Yorkshire (also MC and CA)	Calderdale	Towns of Halifax, Brighouse, Todmorden, Sowerby Bridge, Elland and Hebden Royd
West Yorkshire (also MC and CA)	Bradford	City of Bradford as well as the towns of Keighley, Shipley, Bingley and Ilkley
West Yorkshire (also MC and CA)	Leeds	City of Leeds as well as the towns of Farsley, Garforth, Guiseley, Horsforth, Morley, Otley, Pudsey, Rothwell, Wetherby and Yeadon

North Lincolnshire, North East Lincolnshire, East Riding of Yorkshire and Kingston upon Hull unitary authorities used to be part of Humberside which meant the region was called Yorkshire & Humberside.

== Regional assembly ==
The Yorkshire and Humber Assembly was a partnership of all local authorities in the region and representatives of various economic, social and environmental sectors. The full Assembly normally met three times a year, normally in February, June and October.

The full Assembly is responsible for providing regional leadership, agreeing regional strategic priorities, directing the development of the Integrated Regional Framework and endorsing key regional strategies. Membership comprises all 22 local authorities in this region, plus 15 Social, Economic and Environmental partners, and the National Parks for planning purposes.

On 31 March 2009, the Assembly was abolished and replaced by Local Government Yorkshire and Humber, until its subsequent closure in 2015.

Yorkshire is one of the two regions (along with the North West) that were expected to have a referendum about the establishment of an elected regional assembly. When the North East region of England rejected having an elected regional assembly in a referendum, the then Deputy Prime Minister John Prescott announced that he would not move orders for other referendums before the relevant provisions expired in June 2005.

The committees for the region ceased to exist after 12 April 2010; regional ministers were not reappointed by the incoming Cameron–Clegg coalition government, with the associated government offices abolished in 2011.

== European Parliament ==
Before the UK exit from the European Union on 31 January 2020, the European constituency of Yorkshire and the Humber was coterminous with the English region.

Population pyramid in 2020

== Demographics ==

Relative population map.

Total Yorkshire and the Humber population (wikidata:Q48063) = 5,502,967 (2019 estimation)
(WD = Wikidata page)

[Hide/show county populations]
	Yorkshire and the Humber	pop.
1	City of York	209,893^{WD}
2	East Riding of Yorkshire	602,327^{WD}
3	North East Lincolnshire	159,821^{WD}
4	North Lincolnshire	172,005^{WD}
5	North Yorkshire (district)	623,501^{WD}
6	South Yorkshire	1,402,918^{WD}
7	West Yorkshire	2,378,148^{WD}

=== Population, density and settlements ===
County	Population	Population density	Largest town/city	Largest urban area
Yorkshire and the Humber	5,177,200	328/km^{2}	Leeds (761,100)	West Yorkshire Urban Area (1,499,465)
West Yorkshire	2,118,600	1,004/km^{2}	Leeds (761,100)	West Yorkshire Urban Area (1,499,465)
South Yorkshire	1,292,900	833/km^{2}	Sheffield (551,800)	Sheffield Urban Area (640,720)
East Riding of Yorkshire	587,100	137/km^{2}	Kingston upon Hull (257,000)	Kingston upon Hull Urban Area (301,416)
North Yorkshire (part)	1,061,300	123/km^{2}	York (193,300)	York Urban Area (137,505)
Lincolnshire (part)	217,900	508/km^{2}	Grimsby (87,574)	Grimsby/Cleethorpes (138,842)

=== List of districts by population ===
Key
City
Borough
District

Rank	District	County	Population
1	Leeds	West Yorkshire	789,194
2	North Yorkshire	North Yorkshire	614,505
3	Sheffield	South Yorkshire	582,506
4	Bradford	West Yorkshire	537,173
5	Kirklees	West Yorkshire	438,727
6	Wakefield	West Yorkshire	345,038
7	East Riding of Yorkshire	East Riding of Yorkshire	339,614
8	Doncaster	South Yorkshire	310,542
9	Rotherham	South Yorkshire	264,671
10	Kingston upon Hull	East Riding of Yorkshire	260,645
11	Barnsley	South Yorkshire	245,199
12	York	North Yorkshire	209,893
13	Calderdale	West Yorkshire	203,826
14	North Lincolnshire	Lincolnshire	172,005
15	North East Lincolnshire	Lincolnshire	159,821

The region has fewer degree-educated adults than the England average and the UK's highest rate of cancer.

=== Ethnicity ===
Ethnic group	Year											
Ethnic group	1971 estimations		1981 estimations		1991		2001		2011		2021	
Ethnic group	Number	%	Number	%	Number	%	Number	%	Number	%	Number	%
White: Total	–	98.1%	4,600,341	96.8%	4,622,503	95.6%	4,641,263	93.48%	4,691,956	88.8%	4,679,965	85.5%
White: British	–	–	–	–	–	–	4,551,394	91.67%	4,531,137	85.75%	4,431,265	80.9%
White: Irish	–	–	–	–	–	–	32,735	0.65%	26,410	0.49%	25,215	0.5%
White: Irish Traveller/Gypsy	–	–	–	–	–	–	–	–	4,378	–	5,891	0.1%
White: Roma	–	–	–	–	–	–	–	–	–	–	9,464	0.2%
White: Other	–	–	–	–	–	–	57,134	1.15%	130,031	2.46%	208,130	3.8%
Asian or Asian British: Total	–	–	–	–	159,355	3.3%	234,826	4.72%	385,964	7.3%	487,055	8.8%
Asian or Asian British: Indian	–	–	–	–	40,752		51,493		69,252		81,322	1.5%
Asian or Asian British: Pakistani	–	–	–	–	94,820		146,330		225,892		296,437	5.4%
Asian or Asian British: Bangladeshi	–	–	–	–	8,347		12,330		22,424		29,018	0.5%
Asian or Asian British: Chinese	–	–	–	–	8,177		12,340		28,435		29,589	0.5%
Asian or Asian British: Asian Other	–	–	–	–	7,259		12,333		39,961		50,689	0.9%
Black or Black British: Total	–	–	–	–	36,634	0.8%	34,262	0.69%	80,345	1.52%	117,643	2.2%
Black or Black British: African	–	–	–	–	4,885		9,625		46,033		80,907	1.5%
Black or Black British: Caribbean	–	–	–	–	21,513		21,308		23,420		22,736	0.4%
Black or Black British: Other	–	–	–	–	10,236		3,329		10,892		14,000	0.3%
Mixed: Total	–	–	–	–	–	–	44,995	0.9%	84,558	1.6%	117,017	2.2%
Mixed: White and Caribbean	–	–	–	–	–	–	18,187		33,241		39,296	0.7%
Mixed: White and African	–	–	–	–	–	–	4,094		9,321		15,644	0.3%
Mixed: White and Asian	–	–	–	–	–	–	14,218		26,008		36,888	0.7%
Mixed: Other Mixed	–	–	–	–	–	–	8,496		15,988		25,189	0.5%
Other: Total	–	–	–	–	18,032	0.4%	9,487	0.19%	40,910	0.77%	79,094	1.5%
Other: Arab	–	–	–	–	–	–	–	–	21,340		25,474	0.5%
Other: Any other ethnic group	–	–	–	–	18,032	0.4%	9,487	0.19%	19,570		53,620	1.0%
Non-White: Total	–	1.9%	154,344	3.2%	214,021	4.4%	323,570	6.5%	591,777	11.2%	800,809	14.5%
Total	–	100%	4,754,685	100%	4,836,524	100%	4,964,833	100%	5,283,733	100%	5,480,774	100%

=== Religion ===
Religion in Yorkshire and the Humber
Religion	2021		2011		2001	
Religion	Number	%	Number	%	Number	%
Christianity	2,461,519	44.9%	3,373,450	60.2%	3,627,774	73.1%
Islam	442,533	8.1%	376,152	6.7%	189,089	3.8%
Hinduism	29,243	0.5%	24,074	0.5%	15,797	0.3%
Sikhism	24,034	0.4%	22,179	0.4%	18,711	0.4%
Buddhism	15,803	0.3%	14,319	0.3%	7,188	0.1%
Judaism	9,355	0.2%	9,929	0.2%	11,554	0.2%
Other religion	23,618	0.4%	16,517	0.3%	9,624	0.2%
No religion	2,161,185	39.4%	1,366,219	25.9%	699,327	14.1%
Religion not stated	313,484	5.7%	360,627	6.8%	385,769	7.8%
Total population	5,480,774	100%	5,283,733	100%	4,964,833	100%

=== Teenage pregnancy ===
For top-tier authorities, Kingston upon Hull has the highest teenage pregnancy rate, closely followed by North East Lincolnshire. For top-tier authorities, North Yorkshire has the lowest teenage pregnancy rate.

Rotherham had the UK's youngest grandmother, who was 26 years old as her 12-year-old daughter gave birth on 26 August 1999.

=== Social deprivation ===
For multiple deprivation in England, measured by the Indices of deprivation 2007, the most deprived council districts in the region are, in descending order – Kingston upon Hull (11th in England), Bradford (32nd), Doncaster (41st), Barnsley (43rd), North East Lincolnshire (49th), Sheffield (63rd), Wakefield (66th), Rotherham (68th), Kirklees (82nd), Leeds (85th), and Scarborough (97th). These areas are mostly represented by Labour MPs, with a few Conservative MPs representing parts of Leeds (with a Lib Dem MP) and North East Lincolnshire, and all of Scarborough. Apart from Scarborough, they are unitary authorities.

The least deprived districts are, in descending order – Harrogate, Hambleton, Richmondshire, Craven, and Selby – all in North Yorkshire. Like all of North Yorkshire, they are represented by Conservative MPs, aside from Selby which elected a Labour MP at the 2023 Selby and Ainsty by-election. At county level, the least deprived areas are, in descending order – North Yorkshire, York and the East Riding of Yorkshire which all have roughly the same level of deprivation, and lower than the majority of England, including Cheshire and Northamptonshire.

The region as a whole is one of the more deprived in England, measured by having far more Lower Layer Super Output Areas (LSOAs) in the 20% most deprived districts than the 20% least deprived districts.

Kingston upon Hull has the highest proportion of people not in education, employment or training NEETs in the region (and fairly high for the UK – 10.6%). This is another demographic extreme it shares with Knowsley in Merseyside.

In March 2011 the region had the third highest overall unemployment claimant count in England with 4.4%. For the region, Hull has the highest rate with 7.8% which is the highest for any English district; North East Lincolnshire is next with 6.4%, and Doncaster has 5.2%. Richmondshire has the lowest rate with 1.8% and Harrogate is next lowest with 1.9%.

=== Elections ===
General Election results in 2017

In the 2015 general election, 39% of the region's electorate voted Labour, 33% Conservative, 16% UKIP, 7% Liberal Democrat and 4% Green. Labour had almost twice as many seats than the Conservatives with 33 Labour, 19 Conservative and 2 Liberal Democrat. There was a 2.5% swing from Conservative to Labour. However, although Labour has around 60% of the region's seats, the geographic spread is mostly Conservative, due to the Labour seats having a much smaller geographic area.

In the 2017 general election, Sheffield Hallam incumbent Nick Clegg (Liberal Democrats) was defeated by Labour candidate Jared O'Mara, with Labour taking all of South Yorkshire while remaining concentrated in the other coalfield areas and Hull. However, the 2019 general election saw Labour lose ground, mainly to the Conservatives, within the region.

=== ONS ITL ===
In the Office for National Statistics International Territorial Levels (ITL), Yorkshire and the Humber is a level-1 ITL region, coded "UKE", which is subdivided as follows:

ITL 1	Code	ITL 2	Code	ITL 3	Code
Yorkshire and the Humber	UKE	East Riding and North Lincolnshire	UKE1	Kingston upon Hull	UKE11
		East Riding and North Lincolnshire	UKE1	East Riding of Yorkshire	UKE12
		East Riding and North Lincolnshire	UKE1	North and North East Lincolnshire	UKE13
		North Yorkshire	UKE2	York	UKE21
		North Yorkshire	UKE2	North Yorkshire CC	UKE22
		South Yorkshire	UKE3	Barnsley, Doncaster and Rotherham	UKE31
		South Yorkshire	UKE3	Sheffield	UKE32
		West Yorkshire	UKE4	Bradford	UKE41
		West Yorkshire	UKE4	Leeds	UKE42
		West Yorkshire	UKE4	Calderdale and Kirklees	UKE44
		West Yorkshire	UKE4	Wakefield	UKE45

== Transport ==
=== Transport policy ===
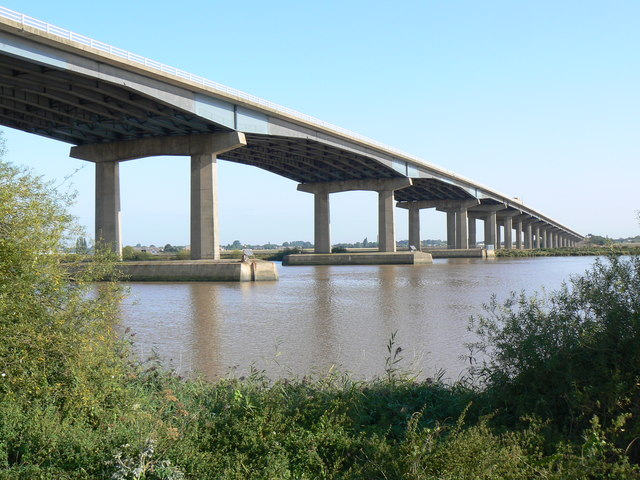
M62 Ouse Bridge, built in 1976

As part of the national transport planning system, the Regional Assembly is required to produce a Regional Transport Strategy to provide long-term planning for transport in the region. This involves region wide transport schemes such as those carried out by the Highways Agency and Network Rail. Within the region the local transport authorities plan for the future by producing Local Transport Plans (LTP) which outline their strategies, policies and implementation programmes. The most recent LTP is that for the period 2006–11. In the Yorkshire and The Humber region the following transport authorities have published their LTP online: East Riding of Yorkshire U.A., Kingston upon Hull, North East Lincolnshire U.A., North Lincolnshire U.A., North Yorkshire, South Yorkshire, West Yorkshire and York U.A.

=== Road ===
The M62's route in relation to the four major cities it serves: Liverpool, Manchester, Leeds and Hull.

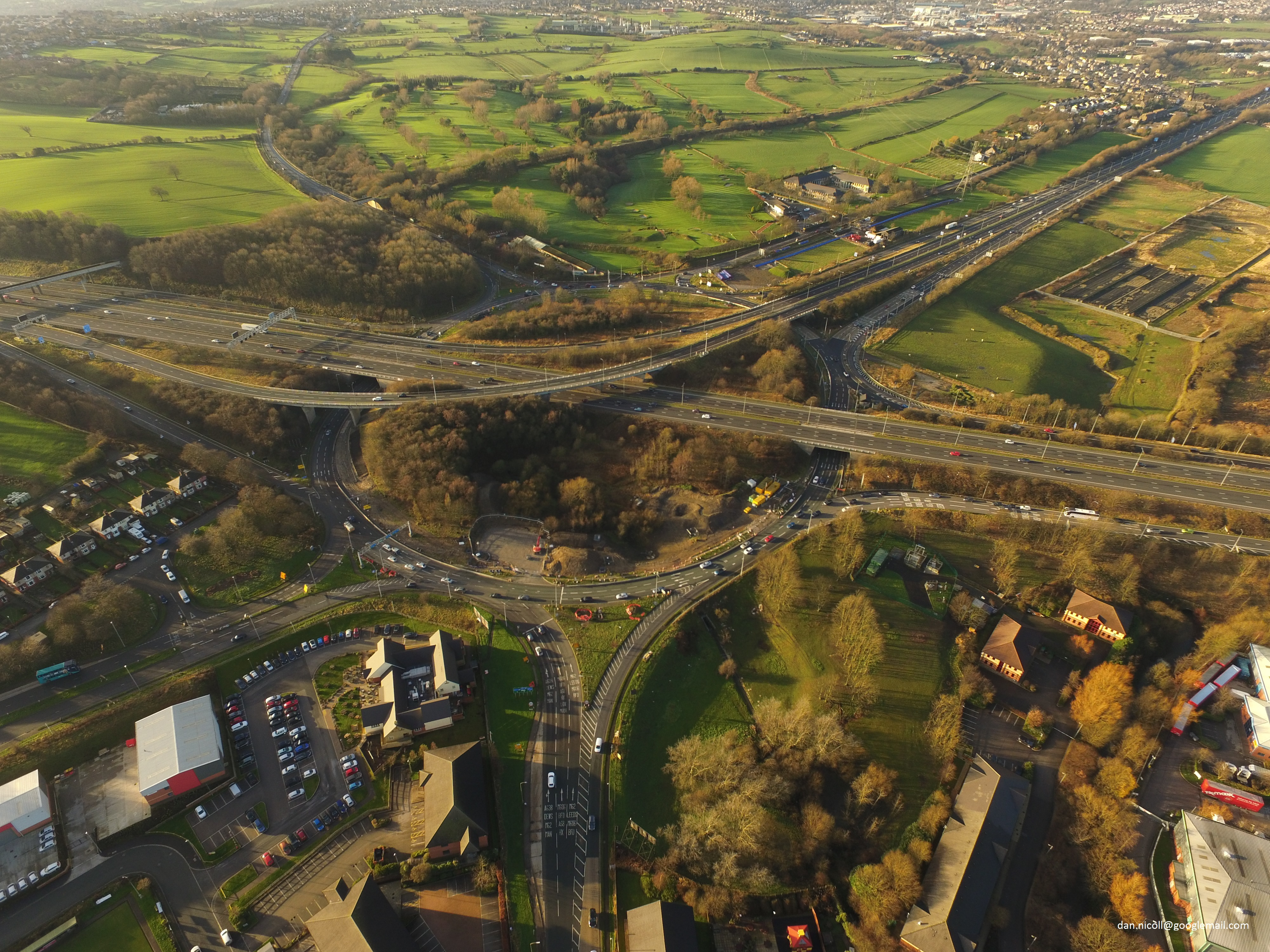
The Chain Bar Interchange on the M62, looking west, at the end of the M606, north of Cleckheaton

The M62 motorway is Yorkshire's main east–west thoroughfare, and north–south routes are the M1 and the A1, with only the A1 continuing further north, with an upgrade to motorway status currently being built between Leeming and Barton. The other main north–south road in the region is the A19. The M180 (continuing as the A180) connects the ports at Grimsby and Immingham via the M18 (European route E22).

The A64 road connects areas in the north-east of the region to the main body of motorways. The M1 was originally designed to finish at the A1 at Doncaster; this section became the M18 in December 1967. The section from the Thurcroft Interchange to Leeds (originally known as the Leeds-Sheffield Spur) was essentially designed to replace the A61, which is still the main road that connects the centres of Sheffield, Barnsley, Wakefield and Leeds, and continues through Harrogate and Ripon to Thirsk. The M180 is shadowed by the A18, which is the main road through Scunthorpe. The single-carriageway A1079 connects Hull to York, and has been exceeding its designed capacity for many years.

The main north–south and east–west routes interchange at a series of junctions to the south and east of Leeds, near Castleford. Leeds and Bradford have inner-city urban motorways, while Sheffield has the Sheffield Parkway and Hull has the Clive Sullivan Way (A63) which connect the city centres with the motorway network. Leeds has an inner-ring road network made mostly out of purpose-built motorway stretches which is mostly sub-terrain to the north of the city centre. Bradford, Huddersfield, Sheffield and York have inner-ring roads made by re-aligning existing roads while Halifax has a town-centre relief scheme made up of the Aachen Way and the North Bridge flyovers. The Office of the Traffic Commissioner central office is on the B6159 in east Leeds (Hillcrest House), which processes England and Wales LGV and PSV licences.

The Humber Bridge, the tallest bridge in the UK at 538 feet, was the world's longest suspension bridge from 17 July 1981 until 5 April 1998; it was built to connect with a proposed new town near the A15/M180 interchange.

=== Rail ===
The central hubs of the rail network in the region are Leeds, Sheffield and York. The East Coast Main Line passes through Leeds and York, operated by London North Eastern Railway which has its headquarters in York. The Midland Main Line finishes at Sheffield, with a less regular service to Leeds, operated by East Midlands Railway. East–west routes are operated by TransPennine Express to Manchester and Liverpool. Leeds has a fairly extensive commuter network and an electrified section in the North of Bradford provides many commuter services. Sheffield has a smaller commuter rail network and there are also less extensive systems in Doncaster, Huddersfield, Wakefield and Harrogate, which connect the districts of the settlements to the centre by rail. The express service between Leeds and Huddersfield is notably quick.

The South Yorkshire Passenger Transport Executive and West Yorkshire Metro subsidise commuters' travel with discount schemes. Class 399 tram-trains were introduced in Sheffield in 2017.

Hull is connected to London by Hull Trains' services. North Yorkshire has a skeleton train network, with Scarborough and York being the main destinations. The Yorkshire Coast Line connects Hull to Scarborough. The Hull to York Line runs along the north of the Humber through Selby, and takes in Sherburn-in-Elmet and nearby rural stations south of York, being of great use to commuters to York since being reopened in the 1980s.

South of the Humber, Scunthorpe and nearby rural stations are connected by the South Humberside Main Line, run by Northern. Grimsby is connected (also through Scunthorpe) on TransPennine Express' South TransPennine route from Sheffield (originating at Manchester Airport).

The region is home to a rail land speed record. On 1 November 1987, an InterCity 125 travelled at 238 km/h between Northallerton and Thirsk.

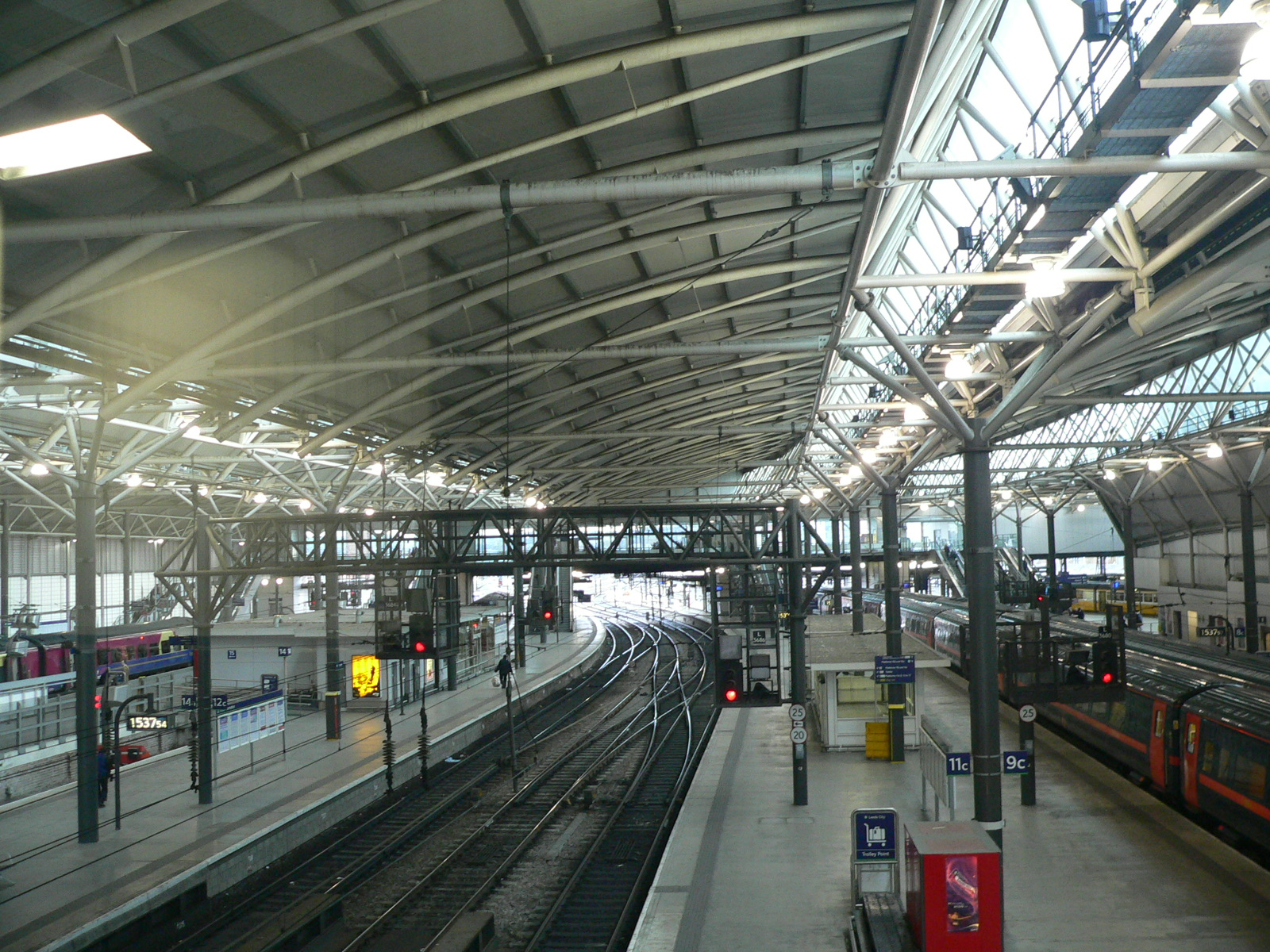
Leeds railway station is the busiest in the region.

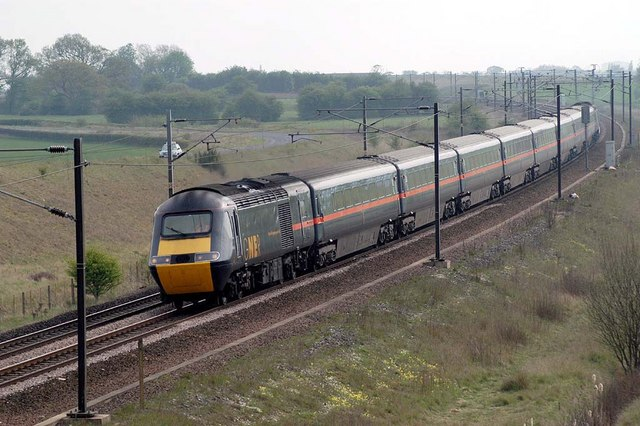
A GNER InterCity 125 near York. The InterCity 125 set the current world speed record for a diesel train (148 mph) near Thirsk in 1987.

=== Mass transit ===
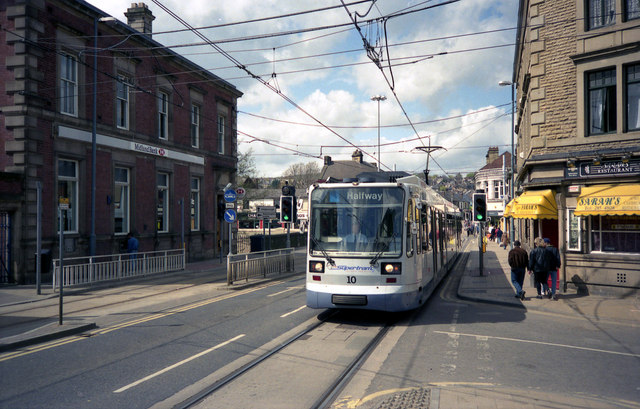
Sheffield Supertram in 1998

Only Sheffield has its own mass-transit system, the Sheffield Supertram, owned by SYPTE and run by Stagecoach. Leeds and Bradford have more developed commuter rail systems but lack any mass transit system. The Leeds Supertram was an approved scheme in Leeds. However, the funding was pulled and the scheme has been replaced by the proposed Leeds Trolleybus scheme, which itself, was also cancelled. In the past Bradford, Halifax, Huddersfield, Kingston upon Hull, Leeds, Rotherham, Sheffield and York have all had mass-transit systems.

=== Air ===
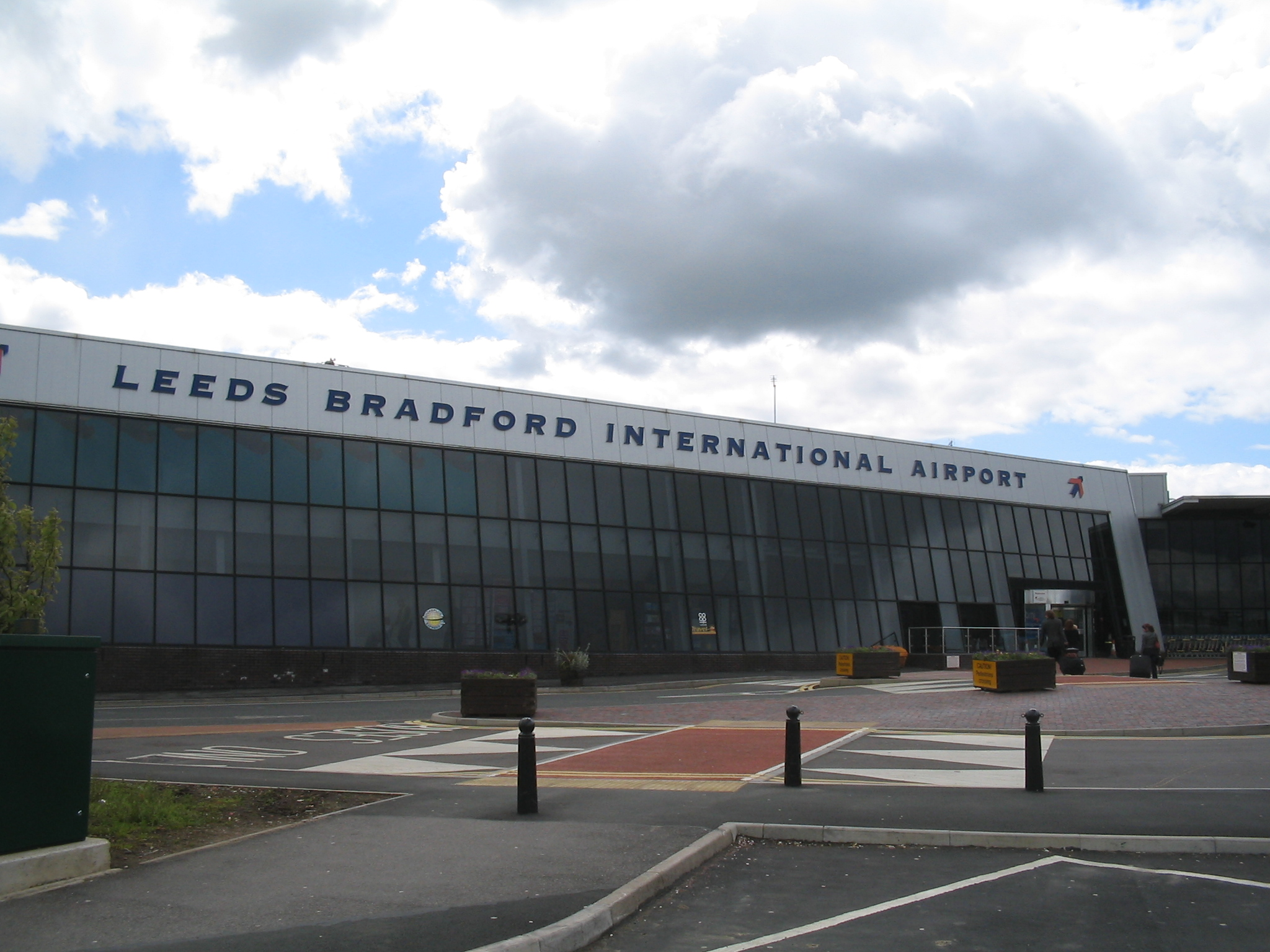
Leeds Bradford Airport is the busiest in the region.

Airports in the region are Leeds Bradford Airport at Yeadon, Doncaster Sheffield Airport (which opened in April 2005 on the former RAF Finningley) near Doncaster and Humberside Airport (which opened in April 1974 on the former RAF Kirmington) near Brigg in North Lincolnshire. Leeds Bradford Airport is the largest in the region by passenger numbers, Robin Hood boasts the longest runway (2.7 km) of any airport in the region and Humberside Airport boasts an active heliport. Jet2.com, a popular low-cost airline at Leeds Bradford has around fifty Boeing 737 aircraft.

Sheffield City Airport formerly served the city of Sheffield. However, the airport struggled to attract many scheduled services and closed following the opening of Doncaster Sheffield Airport.

Lying outside of the region Teesside International Airport (former RAF Middleton St George) serves the northernmost areas of the region, being next to the River Tees, and less than a mile from Over Dinsdale on North Yorkshire's northern edge. There are day and night direct rail connections from the region to Manchester Airport. National Express coach services also run directly to Heathrow Airport from the region.

=== Water ===
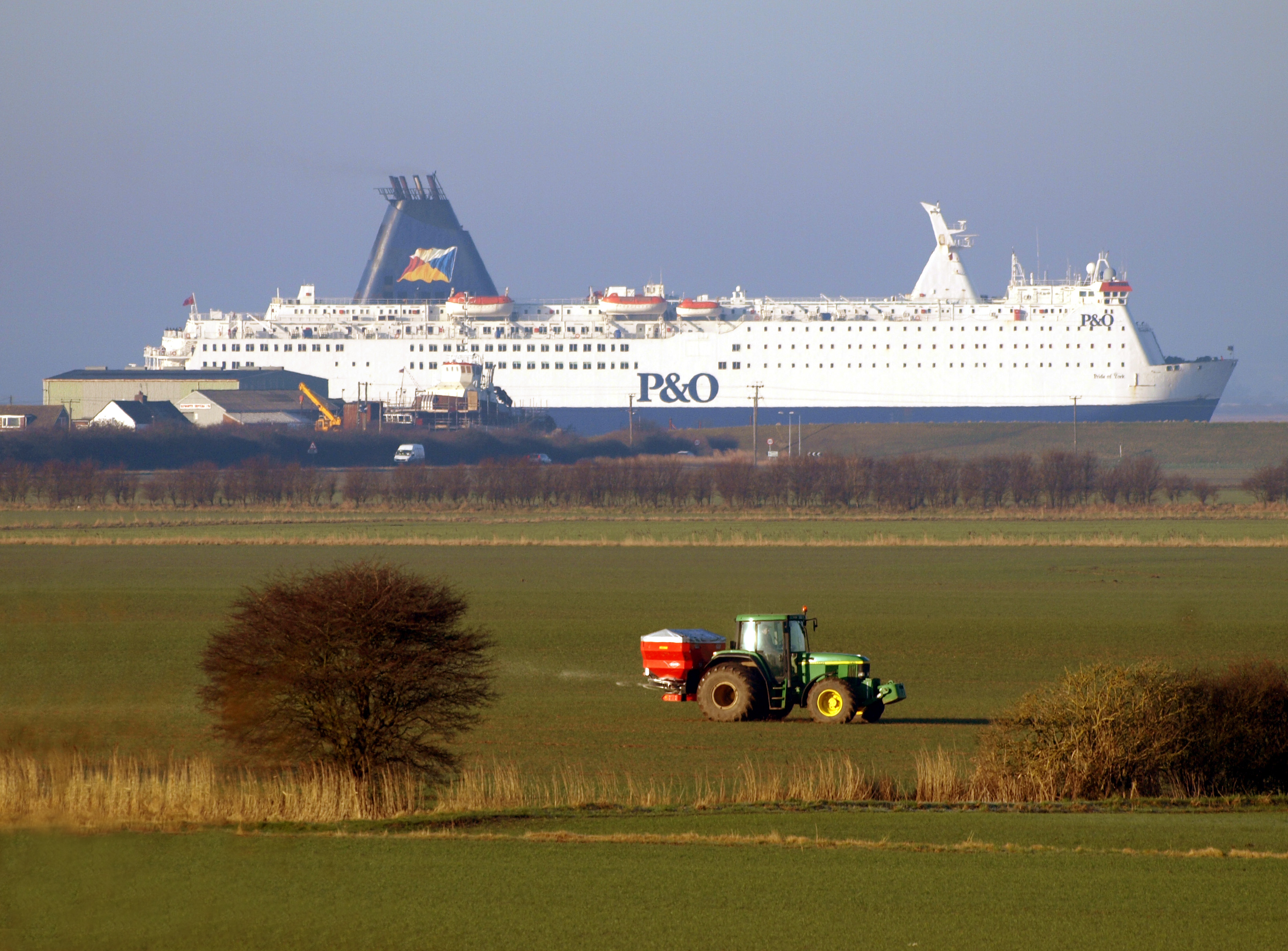
The Pride of York (MS Norsea) ferry, which operates from Hull, in March 2010; the service to Rotterdam began in August 1965 and the service to Gothenburg (Göteborg) started in March 1966

Hull has daily ferries (former North Sea Ferries) to Zeebrugge and Rotterdam (Europoort). Hull also has a large freight port and an active fishing port. Immingham carries much freight transport via DFDS Tor Line and the Stena Line. Goole is Britain's most inland port and is used mostly for importing commodities such as coal and timber.

The region also has a canal network. The Leeds and Liverpool Canal links West Yorkshire with the North West and the Aire and Calder Navigation links Leeds and the coal fields of West and North Yorkshire with the ports to the East of the region. There are also several smaller canals in the region, often built for quite specific purposes. Many stretches of the smaller canals in the region have been backfilled. The steepest locks in Britain are at Bingley – Bingley Five Rise Locks, built by John Longbotham, who designed the canal.

== Economy ==
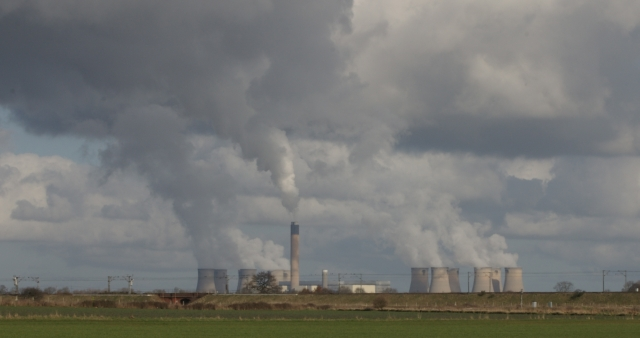
The 4GW Drax power station's 850 foot chimney, built in May 1969, is the tallest in the UK; the power station burns 10 million tonnes of coal a year, via 30 trains a day. It has the second-largest electricity output in western Europe, after Neurath Power Station in western Germany

Until 2011, Yorkshire Forward was the Regional Development Agency charged with improving the Yorkshire and Humber economy, where some 270,000 businesses contribute to an economy worth in excess of £80 billion. The region has the second lowest rate of GVA in England. However, Leeds has a much higher average GVA than most of South Yorkshire. Business Link Yorkshire until November 2011 was on the Capitol Business Park in Dodworth, west of the M1 near Barnsley near the bypass (A628). The region's Manufacturing Advisory Service was until March 2016 at Saint Martins House in Potternewton next to Chapel Allerton Hospital, on the former A61, with two other offices at the Advanced Manufacturing Park, Catcliffe off the A630 Sheffield Parkway, and also on St. Georges Road in the west of Hull; the functions are now represented by the organisation Made in Yorkshire. The UKTI office for the region was off the A653, directly south of Bridgewater Place in Holbeck, and its successor (in July 2016) DIT Yorkshire and the Humber is at the Digital Media Centre near Barnsley Interchange, run by Mark Robson.

NHS Yorkshire and the Humber, the regional strategic health authority, was at the roundabout at the bottom of Kirkstall Road in Leeds, with another office in the north of Sheffield. The charity-funded Yorkshire Air Ambulance, established in October 2000, is based at Nostell Priory south-east of Wakefield on the A638 (previously at Leeds Bradford Airport) and RAF Topcliffe (previously until 2012 at Bagby Airfield near Thirsk); the helicopter can land on the main hospitals' roofs. The state-funded Yorkshire Ambulance Service is based next to Coca-Cola on the Wakefield 41 Business Park, near the A650. National Blood Service for the area is off the A6102 in the north of Sheffield, at the west end of the Northern General Hospital.

As of February 2025, the average property price in Yorkshire and the Humber is £232,511, reflecting a 4.1% increase over the past twelve months. Rental prices have also risen by 5.6% during this period, with the average monthly rent reaching £1,001. Some areas have outperformed the regional average, including Harrogate, where prices have risen by 6.2%, and Leeds, which has seen a 6.9% increase.

Yorkshire in the past has been synonymous with coal mining. Many pits closed in the 1990s, with the last two that were open in the Pontefract area at Kellingley (closed on 18 December 2015) and Sharlston. In South Yorkshire, there was Maltby Main Colliery and Hatfield Colliery (closed in June 2015) at Stainforth. The NUM was very Yorkshire-dominated. Coal still plays a part in the economy – there are two large power stations along the Aire Valley, with Drax being the second largest in Europe with 3,945 MW of capacity, and Eggborough which is owned by the Czech Republic's Energetický a průmyslový holding (EPH) since 2014 and was owned by British Energy until 2010; Ferrybridge C closed on 23 March 2016. The distribution area once looked after by the regional electricity company Yorkshire Electricity is now looked after by Northern Powergrid (former YEDL), owned by Berkshire Hathaway (since 2001) of Omaha, Nebraska. The supply side of the region is now owned by npower (former National Power, now owned by RWE of Essen, Germany). Of the UK's oil, 29% is refined on the Humber.

=== East and North ===
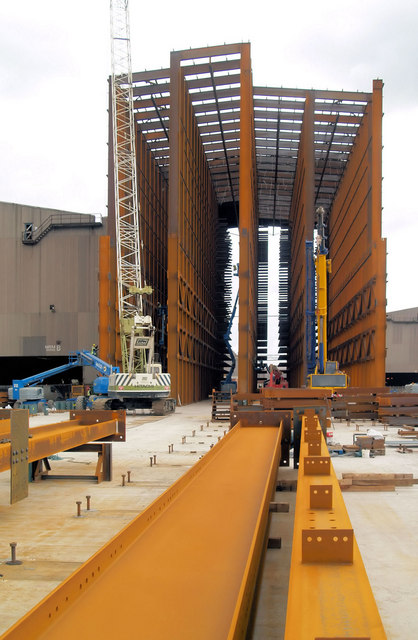
British Steel Limited steelworks at Scunthorpe

Scunthorpe is where steel is smelted by British Steel Limited (former Corus Group before September 2010 then Tata Steel Europe until June 2016) in the east of the town; it is the largest steelworks in the UK. Golden Wonder crisps are made in Frodingham, opposite the steel works (former site of Riley's Potato Crisps); the brand originated in Scotland. Esca Food Solutions (another plant was in Milton Keynes before October 2007) make all the beef patties for McDonald's in the UK and Ireland at their factory in Crosby in the north-west of the town, processing around 7000 cattle a week – about 12,000 kg an hour; 2.25m cattle are killed in the UK each year. IAC Group (Ecomold before 2008) have a car interiors plant on the Foxhills Industrial Estate in the north of Scunthorpe off the A1077; to the west, Can-Pack UK (parent company in Kraków) is on the Skippingdale Industrial Estate, and makes aluminium beverage cans; further north, Nisa (retailer) have their headquarters on the Normanby Enterprise Park, in Flixborough off the B1430.

Further south on the Foxhills Industrial Estate towards the A1077, Wren Kitchens have a large factory in a former B&Q warehouse, which closed in 2009; next-door to the north, 2 Sisters Food Group have a large chicken processing plant (Premier Fresh Foods before 2000), built in 1988 as one of the largest plants of its type in Europe, which processes around 1,900,000 chickens per week (customers include KFC). TSC Foods on the Queensway Industrial Estate at the A18/A1029 roundabout in south-east Scunthorpe supply many foodservice products (sauces) to most UK pub chains. Caparo Merchant Bar, next to the steel works in Scunthorpe, are the UK's largest producer of merchant bar; nearby is British Steel Wire Rod. Vossloh Cogifer UK (former Corus Cogifer before 2012), a joint venture of Vossloh Cogifer (of Reichshoffen) and the former Corus Rail, make railway points to the west of Scunthorpe; Voestalpine also make train tracks too at a huge foundry in Austria

Pipers Crisps are on a former airfield next to the A15 at Elsham; next door is IG Industries who produce polyethylene films (shrink wrap). There are two large oil refineries west of Immingham, owned by ConocoPhillips (Jet) and TotalEnergies. Kimberly-Clark made all of its Huggies nappies for Europe at Barton-upon-Humber until 2013; since 2016, the site has been the headquarters and factory of Wren Kitchens. Techrete on the B1207 in the north of Hibaldstow, next to the railway line, is the UK's leading maker of architectural precast cladding. County Turf, off the B1207 (Ermine Street) in Appleby made the turf for Wembley Stadium, who replaced Inturf of Wilberfoss. There is a large CEMEX cement plant at Winteringham off the A1077 at the meeting point of the New River Ancholme and the Humber (Ferriby Sluice).

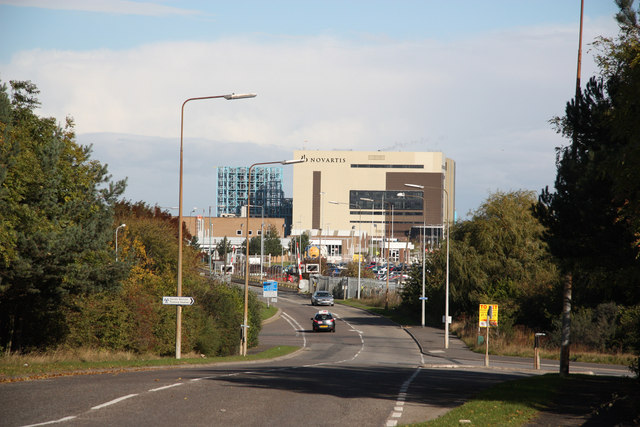
The 226-acre Novartis Grimsby in Great Coates, next to the Europarc in the west of Grimsby; it has been there since 1951, firstly as Ciba (Chemical Industry Basel) making sulfathiazole

Grimsby is home of England's fishing industry (although most fish is transported from the Peterhead area of Scotland via road), and has many frozen food factories such as Young's Seafood. The seafood industry is worth £1.8 billion to North East Lincolnshire; most of Britain's seafood comes from Grimsby. HM Revenue & Customs in the town centre administers the UK's deregistration of VAT for companies, and the VAT Annual Accounting Scheme. Auto-Trail makes motorhomes on the Europarc, Grimsby, owned by Paris-based Trigano. Wyndeham Gait is a main printer next to the A180/A16 roundabout.

Cardsave is a merchant account provider. Cofely Fabricom Engie (former GDF SUEZ), an engineering consultancy based on the A1173 in Immingham, work in the oil and gas industry, and nearby to the east is a large Knauf plaster board plant. Hydro Agri had an important large fertiliser plant (built by Fisons in 1951) on the side of the railway; now PB Kent and its subsidiary Humber Palmers (both owned by Origin Enterprises of Ireland) make fertiliser there. In Healing (former Little Coates) next to the Humber, Lenzing Fibers Grimsby make Lyocell (Tencel), where it was first made by Courtaulds in 1988, who owned the site until bought by AkzoNobel in 1998. Greenergy have a biodiesel plant at Immingham West Terminal.

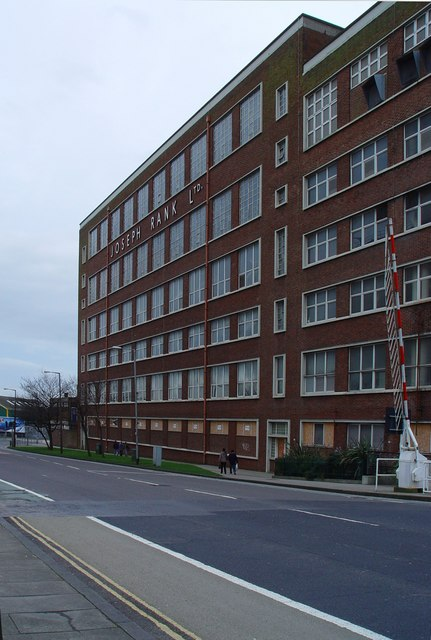
Joseph Rank Ltd in Hull in January 2008

AarhusKarlshamn UK (AAK, edible oils) is at Hull Ferry Terminal. The Valuation Office Agency for the north of England is near King George Dock. Smith & Nephew (wound management division) and Reckitt Benckiser medical and household products companies originated in Hull, and still have large factories there. When Reckitt & Colman merged with the Dutch Benckiser in 1999, much production was moved from Hull to Swindon. Heron Frozen Foods is based there near St Andrew's Quay, and Cranswick plc are a food-processing company based in the north of Hull, which makes up-market (Taste the Difference) gourmet sausages for Tesco and Sainsbury's, and The Black Farmer, in West Carr; Cranswick Country Foods have their main poultry processing site off the B1237 in the north of Stoneferry.

Croda Europe has a chemical factory on the north side of the A1165 in Newland next to River Hull; further south in Sculcoates, Crown Paints have a factory on the west side of the River Hull. Walker Group in Hull own Victoria Plumb bathrooms, and the brand MFI. Aunt Bessie's is a large food company in the west of Hull near the A63 and Hessle. Nearby Norbert Dentressangle claim to run the largest pea processing factory in the world at the junction of the A1166 and the Clive Sullivan Way (A63), which has supplied all of Birds Eye's peas since June 2008.

Ideal Standard, the plumbing company, now in north Hull next to the Hull–Scarborough line (Yorkshire Coast Line), was formed in Hull in 1936. Ideal Heating, owned by Stelrad and based nearby, make domestic boilers, and have diversified into air source heat pumps and solar thermal water heaters. Comet, who originated there, had some main offices on George Street. Gamebore Cartridge on the A1165 at Drypool, Hull and Hull Cartridge, on the Acorn Industrial Estate north of Ideal, both make shotgun cartridges. Logan Teleflex (former Fabricom Airport Systems, and owned by Daifuku) makes luggage sorting systems near the B1237/A1033 junction in north Hull. KCOM Group (former Kingston Communications) is a telecommunications company based next to Hull City Hall.

Seven Seas, owned by Merck Group, made cod liver oil and multivitamins (Haliborange) on the A1033 in Marfleet until 2015; next door is Willerby Holiday Homes, the UK's largest manufacturer of holiday homes; nearby, Paneltex is a group of engineering companies for vehicle bodies, on the Kingston International Park on the A1033, opposite Saltend; next door is Atlas Leisure Homes (in Preston). Humdinger (owned by Zetar) on the A1033 makes branded savoury snacks. Airbath (part of Reva Industries) is in north-east Hull. Fenner Dunlop Europe who claim to be the world's largest conveyor belt manufacturer, in Marfleet, have their own cricket pitch and their Hainsworth Research Centre.

BP Saltend (in Preston) is Europe's largest producer of acetic acid, and part of the worldwide BP Acetyls group; next door, Ineos Enterprises makes vinyl acetate monomer (VAM) and Vivergo (bioethanol) is nearby. Fenner is in Hessle. BAE Systems Military Air & Information (former Blackburn Aircraft, and under threat of imminent closure) at Brough is known as the Home of the Hawk, and recently made the Hawk 128, with a fully digital cockpit. Kohler Mira Ltd make showers on the Melton West Business Park, south of the A63. Guardian Industries makes float glass in Goole; Timloc, part of Alumasc Group, make ventilation for buildings. Croda International, the chemical company, is in East Cowick, near the M62/M18 Langham Interchange. Swift Group in Cottingham are the only UK manufacturer of caravans. Yara UK have a fertiliser blending plant (former Phosyn before 2006) on the A1079 on a former airfield in Barmby Moor. Bridlington is Europe's largest lobster port.

There are many Royal Air Force bases in North Yorkshire, close to the A1(M), Catterick Garrison is the largest army base in Europe near Richmond, and home of the Infantry Training Centre. The Defence School of Transport Leconfield is near Beverley. RAF Fylingdales is an important, though secret, part of NATO's Ballistic Missile Early Warning System; the Emergency Planning College at Easingwold provided courses to prepare for nuclear war. Dishforth Airfield was the first place in the UK to get the Apache helicopter in 2003 for the Army Air Corps, and has had helicopters since 1991, currently having three squadrons of Lynx helicopters. The helicopters train over the North York Moors. 4th Regiment Royal Artillery is at Alanbrooke Barracks (former RAF Topcliffe, and former HQ of 15th Infantry Brigade, which is now at Imphal Barracks). GCHQ (former Composite Signals Organisation) have a site in the west of Scarborough. RAF Leeming is the only RAF station in Northern England that flies jet aircraft; the Yorkshire Universities Air Squadron flies from RAF Linton-on-Ouse (previously it had flown from RAF Church Fenton until 2013).

Nestlé in the UK are based in York, alonside The Original Baker In Malton, with Mackintosh's operations in Halifax. Persimmon plc (the UK's second largest builder of houses, building around 14,000 houses in 2014) is at the A19/A64 Fulford Interchange. The Shepherd Building Group (who own Portakabin), and Portasilo, which makes bulk handling equipment such as silos, are in Huntington off the A1036 in the east of York; AlphaGraphics UK are next door (formerly in Seamer), and to Monks Cross retail park. London North Eastern Railway has its headquarters in York. Terry's chocolate was closed in September 2005 by its new owner Kraft Foods, and production moved to Poland. Costcutter is based on the A1079 in Dunnington. Best Western Hotels UK are based at Clifton Without. CPP Group (credit card insurance) are on Holgate Park on the A59 in the north-west of the city centre; Aviva have a large site on Rougier Street (B1227) for equity release, life insurance, and pensions.

Rolawn at the Laveracks Industrial Estate on the B1228 in Elvington is Europe's largest producer of lawn turf, with its Medallion brand being the UK market leader. DBS National Security Vetting is at Imphal Barracks in Fulford on the A19. Tangerine Confectionery is off the A59, in Acomb Ings in the west of York, which makes toffee and fudge; its old site on Coppergate is now Jorvik Viking Centre; the neighbouring British Sugar plant closed in 2007. Sherbet fountains have been made in York since 1925; the brand was bought by Tangerine from Cadbury in 2008. York Handmade Brick Company, who have supplied bricks for The Shard and London Bridge railway station are based in the village of Alne, north of York.

Streamline, the UK's main merchant account provider formerly owned by NatWest, is on the B6162 at Harlow Hill in the west of Harrogate; Principal Hotel Company UK (hotels), is at Oatlands in the south of the town, where Hein Gericke UK is on Hornbeam Park, next to Harrogate College. Dunlopillo, a world-leading manufacturer of latex foam mattresses was for many years off the A61 at Pannal, south of Harrogate, until 2003, and from 2008 has now been headquartered in Huntingdon (Cambs). The Canadian McCain Ltd has been in Scarborough since 1969; Legrand UK make cable management systems at Cayton south of Scarborough on the B1261 next to McCain, and along the road from the coach builder Plaxton. Boyes (retail) are in Eastfield. Dale Power Solutions, south of the B1261 on the Eastfield Industrial Estate, make electrical power supply equipment. Deep Sea Electronics make generator controllers on the Hunmanby Industrial Estate, off the A165, south of Filey. Whitby Seafoods Ltd is in Whitby; they are the biggest producer of scampi in the UK, and supply Wetherspoons. Westlers, based on the B1257 in Amotherby make tinned convenience food, and the MoD's military ration packs (also made by Vestey Foods of Coulsdon in London). Dalepak is based in Leeming Bar which is owned by ABP Food Group; Vale of Mowbray have made pork pies in Aiskew since 1928. Reed Boardall have the UK's second largest cold storage site on the west side of the A1 at Boroughbridge (the largest is now in Wisbech in Cambridgeshire).

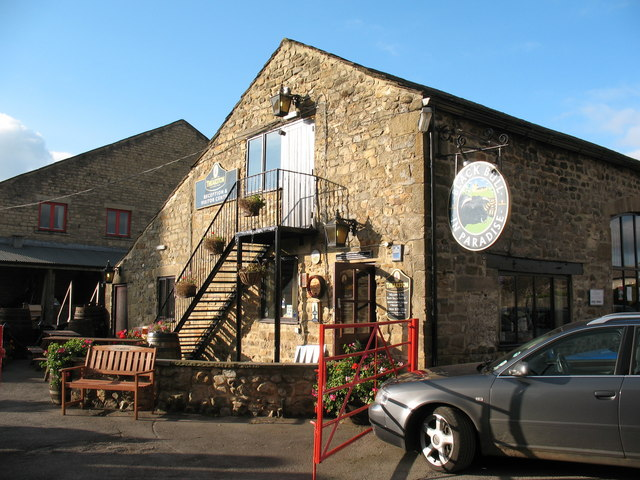
Theakston Visitor Centre in Masham

John Smith's Brewery is at Tadcaster, owned by Heineken UK, which started brewing Newcastle Brown Ale in May 2010, and Samuel Smith Old Brewery. At Masham, there is the Theakston Brewery and the Black Sheep Brewery. Just to the north in Aiskew, Masons Gin have a distillery. Skipton Building Society is in Skipton. Silver Cross, the iconic pram manufacturer named after Silver Cross Street in Leeds, is headquartered in Broughton at the junction of the A59 and A56 west of Skipton, although its Heritage prams are made in Bingley (most are made overseas). Next to Bentham railway station (close to the Lancashire boundary) Kidde Products UK make foam fire extinguishers. Quorn is made in Stokesley by Marlow Foods. The Rural Payments Agency have a main office at Northallerton. Econ Engineering on the A61 Ripon bypass near the B6265 roundabout are Britain's leading manufacturer of salt gritters. Severfield is at Topcliffe on the east side of the A168, on a former airfield; they built the Olympic International Broadcast Centre in London. At another former airfield at Tockwith, further south, Stage One built the Olympic Cauldron, the glowing Olympic Rings, and the aerial stage objects.

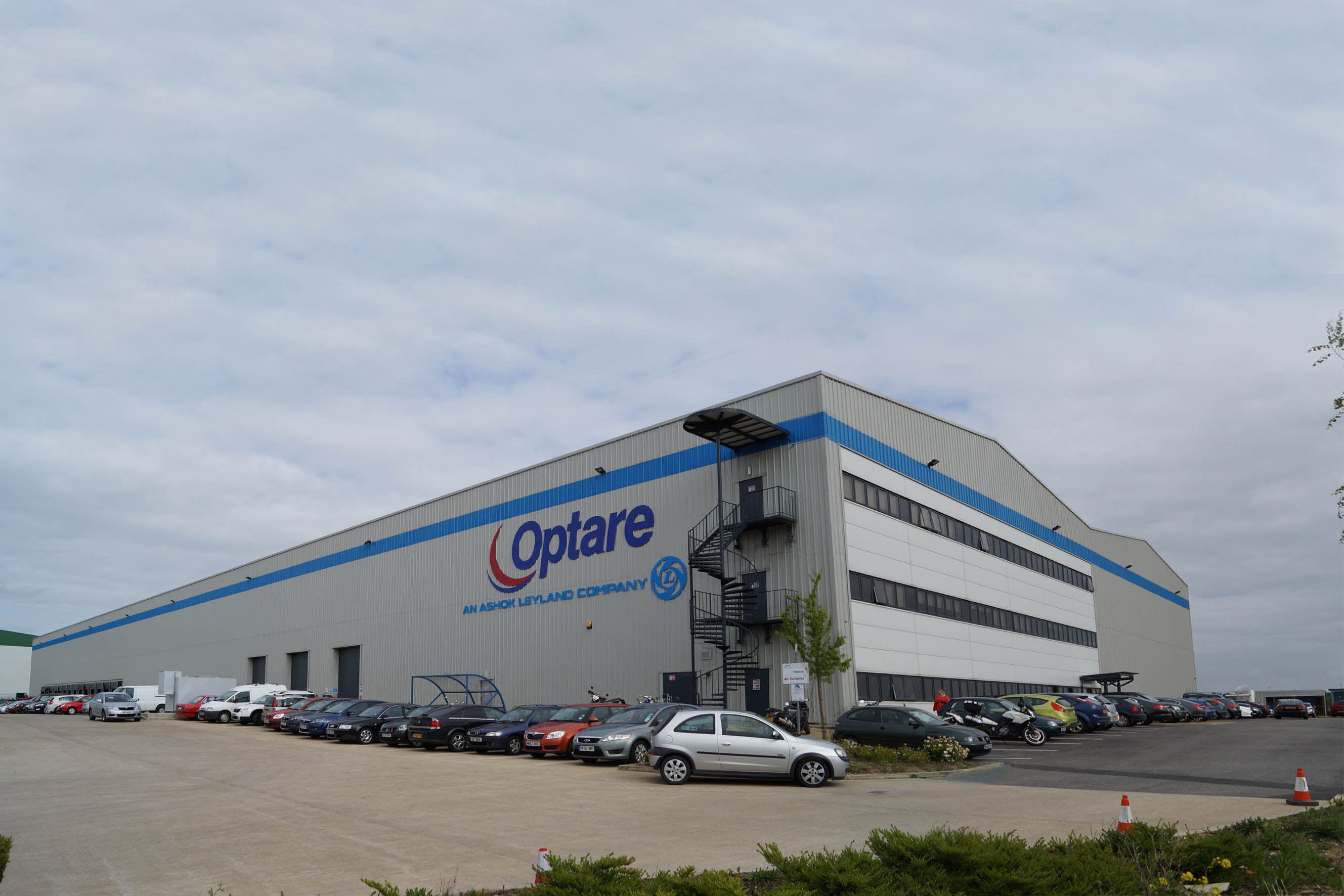
Optare bus factory in North Yorkshire, off the B1222

Austin Reed, who own Viyella, was on the A61 at the western end of Thirsk Racecourse until 2016. Slingsby Aviation make gliders and planes in Kirkbymoorside, on the A170. Perry Slingsby Systems (part of Forum Energy Technologies), next to Slingsby make remotely operated underwater vehicles (ROVs), who have helped to develop the NATO Submarine Rescue System. Karro Food Group based at Malton, are a pork processor, formerly part of Vion NV. South of Selby, Saint-Gobain Glass UK (Solaglas) has made float glass for low emissivity windows since 2000 next to the A19 at the A645 roundabout, directly south of the Eggborough power station. Optare make buses on a large industrial estate in Sherburn-in-Elmet (previously in Cross Gates in Leeds before May 2011), and have been part of Hinduja Group since 2012.

=== West and South ===
Leeds is now a centre of financial services companies, with Direct Line and First Direct based there, as well as Asda, Arla Foods UK (maker of Lurpak and Anchor butter) in Stourton near the A639 junction 44 of the M1 (formerly in Kirkstall near Yorkshire Television). The Green Flag roadside recovery firm has its main call centre (in Farsley). HSBC opened their first UK call centre in the city, taking advantage of its advanced communications network which also led to the founding of Freeserve in Leeds. The Department of Health has a large administration operation at Quarry House, a local landmark. The Child Maintenance and Enforcement Commission was at One Leeds City Office Park until 2012, off the A653 south of Bridgewater Place. The NHS Appointments Commission and former NHS Yorkshire and the Humber were next to the north side of the A65 at the A58(M) junction near the former Park Lane College, where further east along the A58 is the Callcredit credit reference agency, and on the opposite side of the inner ring-road from the Skills for Care sector skills council. The Waddingtons board game company was founded in Leeds, as was the Burton tailoring company (the Burton Group became the Arcadia Group) and Marks & Spencer. The Tetley's Brewery closed in 2011 and moved operations to Northampton (Carlsberg). Aramark UK is in West Park, Leeds, in the north of the city, off the ring road.

The British Library is sited at Thorpe Arch near Wetherby, home of Goldenfry. Dr. Oetker products are made at Colton near M1 junction 46 and Sherburn-in-Elmet; at Thorpe Park Business Park in the east of Leeds (Austhorpe) also is Northern Gas Networks and Republic (retailer). Ellie Louise, a clothes retailer, is at Sturton Grange north of Garforth on the A642, south of M1 junction 47 on the Helios 47 Industrial Estate, near Ginetta Cars. Unilever Leeds (former Gibbs Proprietaries from 1965, then Elida Gibbs from 1971, then Elida Fabergé) have their aerosol division at Whinmoor, in north-east Leeds, administered by Lever Fabergé. It claims to be the largest aerosol factory in the world, and has their research centre, and makes Impulse, Lynx, Dove and Sure. Agfa Graphics (Belgian) have their only UK factory next to Fabergé in Whinmoor, making computer to plate offset printers; 85% of the world's banknotes are printed with the parent company's technology. Nearby in Seacroft is Komori UK (printing presses).

Symington's make breakfast cereals on the Thornes Farm Business Park, near the A63 (M1 junction 45). Sound Leisure is the UK's leading manufacturer of juke boxes. WABCO Vehicle Control Systems UK (air brakes) is in Morley, and QHotels are on Bruntcliffe Road (A650) in Bruntcliffe. East of Morley off the A6110 is DePuy International (orthopaedics). Hermes Europe (former Parcelnet before 2009, which was Directline and Speedlink before 1999), based at Capitol Park on the A650 at Topcliffe, is the UK's largest home delivery company, and is part of Grattan's parent company. Hainsworth makes speciality textiles such as military uniforms and in 1975 produced the first Nomex flame-retardant flight suits for fast-jet pilots in the UK; their TITAN outfit is used by riot police and firefighters, with ceremonial fabrics made from worsted barathea, and uniform caps for the Household Division, and uniforms for others such as London Underground. Clariant UK, the chemical company, was in Yeadon, with a factory in Horsforth; Brenntag UK is based at the A65/A658 junction at Rawdon Park in Yeadon (former Albion Chemicals before 2006) next to the fire station.

EMIS Health are off the A658 in central Yeadon, and are a main supplier of GP computer systems. Craftsman Tools on the A659 in Otley make toolholding systems and fixtures. Sinclairs make the Silvine brand of stationery at Otley. Allied Glass based in south Leeds at the A61/A639 junction, and also has a main plant at Knottingley east of town on the A645, makes glass bottles for whisky. Toggi outdoor clothing (equestrian) is at Confederation Park at the M621 junction 2 with the A643, and with Champion who make riding hats and body protectors; 600 Group, based near junction 2 of the M621, are the world's biggest manufacturer of manual and CNC lathes; it makes Colchester-Harrison lathes, and Pratt Burnerd International lathe-chucks with a lathe factory at Heckmondwike. Sulzer Pumps UK have a large manufacturing facility on the A6110 near the A643 roundabout. Pland Stainless make large sinks for laboratories and hospitals. Leeds is the second largest manufacturing city in the UK, after London.

Morrisons is based in Bradford; it has 132,000 staff and opened its first supermarket in 1961 in a converted cinema; it turned over £17.6 billion in 2015, and is the region's second largest company. Also in Bradford are Club 18-30, Seabrook Potato Crisps, Safestyle UK, Vanquis Banking Group, Yorkshire Building Society, Stylo, the Grattan (owned by Otto GmbH since 2000) catalogue retailer, and Yorkshire Water. Santander UK (former Abbey) has its savings division there. The Halifax bank (former Building Society) is based in Halifax, the Yorkshire Bank and Leeds Building Society in Leeds, and with UK Asset Resolution (former Bradford & Bingley) and Landmark Mortgages in Crossflatts. The area between Leeds, Bradford and Wakefield is known as the Rhubarb Triangle.

Empire Stores of Bradford was Britain's first mail order firm in 1890, bought by Redcats UK (French) and closed in 2009; it is now the site of Redcats UK in the north of the town centre. BASF Performance Products (Ciba Specialty Chemicals until 2008, then Allied Colloids before 1997) is in Low Moor; it makes many chemicals including thickening agents. Bowers Metrology Group, on the B6381 near the junction with A6177 at Bradford Moor, are a leading measuring instruments company, and part of Spear & Jackson. Equifax is off the A650 in central Bradford, opposite the Leisure Exchange; next door NatWest Group have a call centre. Federal-Mogul, off the A650 in east Bradford, makes automotive parts (gudgeon pins and pistons). Princes Soft Drinks have their main factory south of the A650 at Tong Street; Next have a large warehouse nearby.

BorgWarner Turbo Systems make automotive turbochargers (including variable-geometry turbochargers) on the Euroway Industrial Estate off the M606, and produces around 750,000 a year; Jacuzzi UK is nearby. Knightsbridge Furniture is on the B6165 in Lister Hills. Nufarm UK (A H Marks before 2008), make chemicals for phenoxy herbicides, between Wyke and Oakenshaw. Hield (luxury clothing) is in Trident parish, south of the city centre. Pace plc (owned since 2016 by Arris International) in Saltaire is the global market leader in set-top boxes; Pace bought part of Acorn, and based its set top boxes on the RISC OS, which it owned. Denso Marston make car radiators in Shipley; HM Revenue & Customs has its main national payments office between the River Aire and the Leeds Liverpool canal at Shipley, opposite Salt's Mill, in a hexagonal building. Brook Taverner is Europe's largest corporate clothing supplier in Ingrow, off the A629. Cinetic Landis UK, at Cross Hills on the B6265, make CNC-controlled grinding machines.

Reflecting Roadstuds Ltd, where cat's eyes were invented by Percy Shaw, are in Boothtown, in the north of Halifax. Rhodia Novecare UK are at Holywell Green, south of Halifax, and make surfactants for cosmetics; to the north sia Fibral make non-woven abrasives at Greetland off the B6114 (which leads to the Scammonden Bridge) with the company's UK HQ in Brighouse. Gower Furniture (owned by Nobia) is north-east of Halifax in Holmfield in Bradshaw. McVitie's Cake Company (Jamaica Ginger and Lyle's Golden Syrup cakes, and HobNob flapjacks) is in west Halifax. Timeform (horse racecards) are near the A58/A629 roundabout in the north of the town centre and the A58 bridge over Hebble Brook. Crosslee plc, south of Hipperholme on the A644 towards Brighouse, is Europe's largest independent tumble dryer manufacturer, under the White Knight brand. Calrec Audio, an electronics firm that makes mixing desks, are on the A6033 at Nutclough, Hebden Bridge. Cressi-Sub UK (scuba gear) are at Atlas Mill, Brighouse; Kent Introl (control valves) are in the east of Brighouse off the A644. Bedford Shelving are to the west. Marshalls plc (paving stones) are next to the River Calder in Elland and Arran Isle (hardware), near Suma Foods. Terberg DTS UK, supply its own distribution tractors and Schopf aircraft tow tractors from Lowfields Business Park, next to the River Calder off the A629 in Elland; nearby Weir Power & Industrial make Hopkinson and Batley brands of valves.

Fox's Biscuits (part of Northern Foods) and Cattles are in Batley; HSL Manufacturing (High Seat Ltd) are on Grange Road Industrial Estate (B6128) in the east of Batley, north of Hanging Heaton. Rohm and Haas UK (former Morton International, making chemicals) is on the B6117 in Dewsbury Moor, on the south edge of Heckmondwike. Birkby's Plastics make automotive components in Liversedge, and was the first company in the UK to mould plastic in the First World War. Rieter Automotive make car furnishings on the A638 in Heckmondwike. TMD Friction make brake pads (Mintex part of BBA) off the A638 at Chain Bar, Cleckheaton; Tangerine Confectionery (Lion Confectionery) is on the A643. Status International UK (lightbulbs) is in the centre of Cleckheaton. Mars Complementary Petcare is off the A62 on the Oakwell Way Industrial Estate at Birstall, next to Birstall Shopping Park; nearby is Pitchero, a sports website firm. Poundstretcher is in Deighton east of Huddersfield.

David Brown Ltd. is in Lockwood in Huddersfield; this company owned Aston Martin from 1947 to 1972 and the company is now part of Textron. In Huddersfield are Cummins Turbo Technologies (former Holset) who make turbochargers, VTL Group make automotive components, Fired Up Group who own Armco Security and Corby of Windsor (trouser press), Brook Crompton (electric motors) and Graham Group (plumbing retail). To the east of Fired Up is Britannia Rescue (owned by LV) at the A616/B6432 junction. Broadbent, make industrial centrifuges in central Huddersfield. Many fabric companies are in Huddersfield and the surrounding areas; Taylor & Lodge, owned by Bulmer & Lumb of Bradford, wove cloth for the 2011 Royal Wedding; Dugdale Bros & Co are in the centre. Novaglaze produced the glass for the London Eye. Trojan Plastics is the UK's largest bath manufacturer in Milnsbridge in west Huddersfield next to the River Colne. Thornton & Ross healthcare is on the A62 next to the River Colne in Linthwaite. Dathan Tool & Gauge (cutting tools) are in Meltham. John Cotton at the A62/A644 junction in Mirfield are Europe's largest producer of duvets. Camira Fabrics (fabrics for public transport) is based at Hopton Mills, south of Mirfield, with a manufacturing site off the B6108 in the east of Meltham, and makes the upholstery for London buses; further north next to River Calder is a site of Dr. Reddy's Laboratories in the south of Mirfield. Overlooked by the Emley Moor tower at the Grange Moor Roundabout off the A637 and A642 (towards Wakefield) at Grange Moor in Kirkburton is Bonmarché, previously owned by Peacocks until 2012.

Hickson & Welch (owned by Arch Chemicals) were in Castleford and closed in 2005. Netto UK (previously owned by Asda) was in South Elmsall until 2011. Nestle made Toffee Crisp and After Eight in Castleford until 2012 then made in Halifax, and Haribo makes liquorice and Pontefract cakes in Pontefract. Burberry had a main clothing factory in Castleford until the end of 2015, which is planned to move to Leeds. Cott Beverages are between the A645 and the railway in the east of Pontefract (former Benjamin Shaw & Sons before 2006); Tangerine Confectionery (former Cadbury-owned Monkhill Confectionery) make Butterkist (the UK's best-selling) popcorn north of Cott Beverages, near Pontefract Monkhill railway station, on the site which claims to be the birthplace of liquorice. Ardagh Glass UK is in the south of Knottingley, with sites at Monk Bretton and Wheatley (Doncaster). Stölzle Flaconnage (former Bagley's before 1994) makes glass containers, between the A645 and the Aire and Calder Navigation, and further along the A645, Tradebe recycle solvents. Total Lubricants UK is in Knottingley (Ferrybridge Hill) on the B6136. Plasmor (concrete) is in the south-east of Knottingley, with a large site at Great Heck next to a former airfield where H+H (Danish) make aircrete; both sites imported pulverised fuel ash (PFA) from the former Eggborough power station; in east Knottingley, off the A645, Croda Hydrocarbons (bitumen) closed in 2008.

Teva Pharmaceutical Industries UK is next to the M62 at Castleford, near Glasshoughton railway station. LPA Group off the A655 in Hopetown, Normanton makes LED lighting for trains; Poundworld was founded on a Wakefield market in 1974, and the family-owned company has 240 shops. To the west, Napier Brown (part of Real Good Food) makes Whitworths' sugar in Hopetown. On the other side of the M62 (junction 31) in Whitwood, Pioneer Technology UK closed their large plasma TV factory in March 2009. Coca-Cola UK claim to have the largest soft drinks factory in the world at its 41-acre site, with 71,000 sq metres of buildings, at Outwood, which was built in 1989, and produces 6,000 cans (over 100 cans a second, on three canning lines) and 3,300 bottles a minute (seven PET bottling lines, the fastest 2 litre bottling plant in the world), producing 100 million cases of soft drinks a year; the bottle caps are made out of HDPE. To keep up with supply, Rexam have a can factory next door. Nearby is the headquarters of Card Factory, with over 800 shops is Britain's biggest card shop chain and started in 1997; opposite is the Yorkshire Purchasing Organisation, which buys stock for most of the region's metropolitan boroughs and North Yorkshire, on south-west side of Wakefield 41. On the other side of the roundabout is Mitre Sports International. Morrisons have their Rathbones Bakeries on Wakefield 41.

Group Rhodes off the A638 in east Wakefield, make machine cells. On the Flanshaw Industrial Estate in west Wakefield is Technal (aluminium facades) and Wicona, part of Norsk Hydro. Bombardier built trains at Horbury until 2006 where they made CrossCountry's Class 221 Super Voyager and Class 220 Voyager (and were also assembled at the BN plant in Bruges, Belgium and Crespin in France, the former ANF Industrie). Northern Foods are now based at Trinity Business Park off the A636 south of Wakefield town centre. Wakefield Shirt Group is next to the River Calder. Double TWO shirts are based off the A638 in central Wakefield. Nooter/Eriksen UK is off the A636 next to Denby Dale railway station, and produce heat recovery steam generator (HRSGs)

Sheffield is known for its steel industry, which has declined in recent years. Outokumpu (former British Steel plc Stainless) near the Tinsley Viaduct make stainless steel, just north of the former airport, with access via the A631. Polestar is on the A631 in former Brinsworth, now in Sheffield (Tinsley).On the opposite side of the A631 is Betafence UK, part of the world's main fencing manufacturer, and its second biggest plant; near the start of the A631 is Tuffnells Parcel Express (owned by Connect Group since 2014). Nearby, Nederman UK make fume extraction equipment. Durham Duplex and High Speed and Carbide make razor blades and industrial knives on the B6082 in Wood Hill. Nearby Davy Markham (owned by IVRCL) on the A6102 at Darnall, fabricate steel and it has one of largest engineering workshops in western Europe. In the same area is William Cook Cast Products.

Egginton make cutlery in Netherthorpe, in the St Vincent's Quarter east of the Shalesmoor A61 roundabout, which owns Ibberson, George Wostenholm, William Rodgers (who make the Fairbairn–Sykes fighting knife), and Joseph Rodgers, the world's oldest brand of cutlery known for their pen-knives and military knives. Magtec, on the B6083 in Brightside next to the River Don, makes diesel-electric hybrid drive systems that can be retro-fitted to vehicles. Technicut is the UK's market leader in rotary cutting tools on the A6178 in Brightside. Arconic Forgings is at Carbrook off the A6102. Gripple make connectors for wire fences. British Silverware is off the A6109, in the industrial area. SCX Group in Wincobank built the retractable roof for the No. 1 Court (Wimbledon). Polestar, at Tinsley off the A631 next to the M1, claim to have the most advanced gravure printing plant in Europe. Tinsley Bridge off the A631 makes suspension springs and torsion bars. SIG plc (Europe's largest insulation distributor) and Stanley Tools UK are at the former city airport, with a manufacturing plant off the A631 on the Hellaby Industrial Estate next to the M18, and had a former site on the B6075 in Sheffield. Siemens VAI UK is on Sheffield Business Park near the former airport, with EVO Group, who own the Banner stationery company, and Ansys (Fluent and CFX computational fluid dynamics software) has one of two main offices. Go Outdoors, owned by JD Sports since 2016, are in the south of Sheffield, near Bramall Lane off the A61; Hi Gear Products, their brand is on the Boston Street Industrial Estate.

Cadbury UK (formerly Bassett's) make liquorice allsorts in the north of Sheffield on the A61 next-door to Owlerton Stadium; it is Cadbury's Gum & Liquorice division, and also makes Belvita and Oreo for UK market. Swann Morton is a world-leading manufacturer of scalpel blades and medical equipment at Owlerton opposite Bassetts on the A61. Plusnet (owned by BT), learndirect (owned by Ufi Ltd), Online Centres Network, and Jobcentre Plus are in the city centre. Virgin Media have a main contact centre (former Telewest) directly south of Don Valley Stadium, and next to the tram line. Spear & Jackson, the garden tool company, are in the north of Sheffield. B. Braun Medical is at High Green, next to the A616 roundabout in Chapeltown, and Ronseal (owned by Sherwin-Williams) is nearby further south on northern edge of Chapeltown. MachineWorks in Sheffield is the leading developer of CNC simulation on the B6069 near Sheffield Botanical Gardens.

Rosebys were in Rotherham, before 2008, and KP make their nuts in Eastwood, to the north of the town. MTL Group, a steel fabrication company, is based off the A631 in Brinsworth who claim to have the largest press brake in the world (made by Ursviken). Swinden House is home of Liberty Speciality Steels's main Swinden Technology Centre, its main R&D centre in the UK, opposite Rotherham General Hospital on the A618. Brinsworth Strip Mills, run by Liberty Speciality Steels (former Corus Steel Narrow Strip), is opposite the Magna museum, south of the A6178, and makes narrow strip steel. The Primary Mill makes steel billets and blooms – continuous casting with an electric arc furnace with a melting shop, and is also known as Aldwarke Works. Thrybergh Mill is east of the river off the A630, making steel bar, in a rolling mill. The Brightbar Mill is off the A6123, on the west side of the railway next to Rawmarsh, making coiled bar, in a rolling mill. These three sites around are known as Rotherham Works. Beatson Clark (owned by Newship Group) makes glass containers off the A6123 north of Rotherham Central railway station.

Dormer Tools UK (owned by Sandvik) is on Waverley Business Park (Advanced Manufacturing Park) in Catcliffe, off the B6066 next to Morrisons. LuK UK (owned by the Schaeffler Group) make clutches at Wales, south of Aston near the M1 junction 31 with the A57. Jeld-Wen UK (former Boulton & Paul) make doors on Swallownest Industrial Estate on the B6200 in Aston cum Aughton. Laycast were nearby until November 2006, based off the B6200 at Aston cum Aughton, at which steel flywheels, vibration dampers and compacted graphite iron clutch plates were cast at its foundry. Kiveton Park Steel is on the B6059 next to Kiveton Park railway station, mostly in North and South Anston (east of Wales).

Macalloy in Dinnington is a world-leader in threaded tension bar. Fresh-Pak Chilled Foods, off the A633 at Waterside Park, Wombwell, make most of the egg mayonnaise (250 tonnes a week) found in British sandwiches and for sandwich fillers. Morphy Richards and Roberts Radio are based between Swinton and Mexborough. Maplin Electronics is based on the former site of Manvers Main Colliery in Wath-upon-Dearne, off the A6023, with the call centre of EE (former Orange) broadband next door. The UK Commission for Employment and Skills (Sector Skills Councils) is nearby, next to Dearne Valley College, which also looks after Investors in People. Stelrad in Swinton Bridge is the UK's largest producer of domestic radiators, producing 2.5 million a year, and Europe's leading radiator company, based off the A6022. MGB Plastics, on the A6123 in north Rotherham on Barbot Hall Industrial Estate, are the UK's largest manufacturer of wheelie bins, making around 1 million per year.

North-east of Barnsley is Ardagh Glass at Monk Bretton. Slightly further north is Mr Kipling at Carlton; the site was Lyons Cakes (making their Battenberg cakes, Viennese Whirls and Swiss rolls) before April 1995, then RHM's Manor Bakeries until 2007, and makes their exceedingly good fruit pies; one million chocolate yule logs are made there and it is the largest mince pie factory in the world. Jack Fulton (Frozen Value Ltd) is next to the railway, off the A637 at Darton. Wharncliffe Publishing are in Barnsley, and to the east on the A628 in Oakwell, Potters Europe (former Ballotini) make glass microspheres for road reflectors. Galpharm International (bought by Perrigo in January 2008) and Koyo Bearings are at Dodworth near Barnsley. BRC on the Claycliffe Industrial Estate, off the A637 in the north of Barnsley, makes rebar (steel reinforcement). Naylor Industries, off the B6096 between Wombwell and Darfield make earthenware pipes for drainage. Kostal UK make steering column switches and electrical connectors off the A635 at Highgate in Goldthorpe. On the A6195 Grimethorpe Bypass at Little Houghton is the NDC of ASOS.com, in the Dearne Valley, near the former site of Houghton Main Colliery. Lotus Professional (owned since 2012 by SCA) is off the A6102 north of Oughtibridge, north-west of Sheffield, in Wortley.

DFS is at Adwick le Street near the A1/A638 junction. Crompton Lighting have their main factory in Wheatley Park on the A630 in north-east Doncaster. Unipart have a headquarters next to Wabtec, who make railway air brakes, off the A6182 near Potteric Carr at the J3 Business Park, near VolkerRail; nearby are two Amazon fulfilment centres, with another at the Doncaster iPort in Rossington. Relate (former Marriage Guidance Council) is based off the A6182 – and on same site VolkerRail Doncaster is next to DB Cargo UK (former EWS), Schenck Process UK, and Thales have a data centre next door. Webasto have their UK headquarters next to Lakeside Village, Doncaster on the A6182, and make sunroofs and air-conditioning systems. McCormick Tractors had a tractor plant in Doncaster until 2007. Bridon International, a world-leading manufacturer of wire ropes (part of Melrose Industries), are based at Balby Carr, off St Catherines Interchange junction 3 of the M18, and Montracon (vehicle trailers) are headquartered there, with a manufacturing site at Market Weighton; nearby are Darfen Durafencing have been trading for over 100 years, and are the market leader in permanent fencing. Pegler Yorkshire (owned by Aalberts) are near the A630 in Balby Carr, further along from Bridon, with MSI-Quality Forgings opposite with Global-MSI who manufacture petrol station forecourts. Polypipe (uPVC pipes) is in Edlington. CME Sanitary Systems in Warmsworth (a former division of Polypipe, now owned by Wirquin of France) makes the UK's best selling plastic toilet seats off the Warmsworth Interchange of the A1(M). Fellowes UK (stationery) is based on West Moor Park, off West Moor Interchange junction 4 of the M18 (A630) in Armthorpe. Wirquin UK (plumbing) is off the B6376 in Warmsworth.

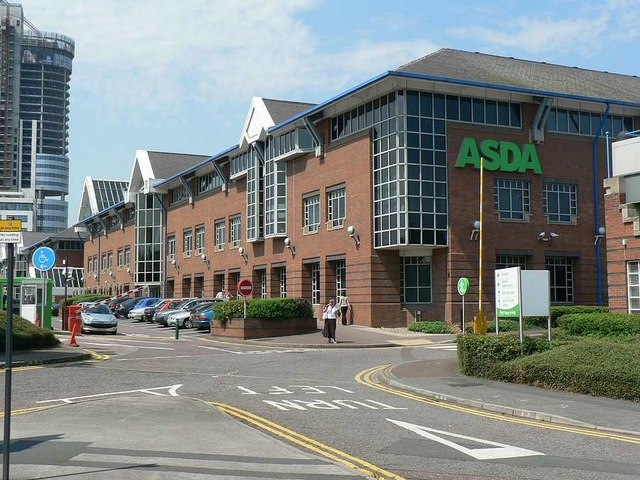
Asda's Headquarters, Asda House in Leeds; Asda was the UK's second largest supermarket until 2014, and is now third; Asda turned over £23.3 billion in 2015, and is the region's largest company

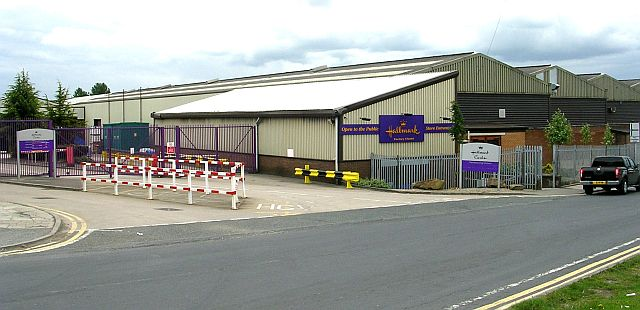
Hallmark Cards UK factory off the A650 (Tong Street), the view on Dawson Lane

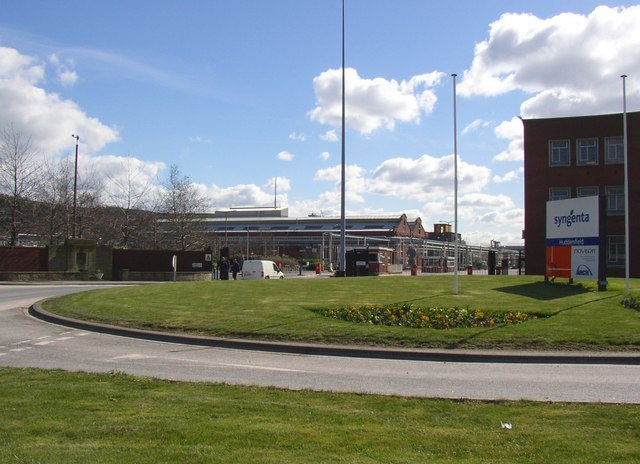
Syngenta (former ICI Organics, then Zeneca Agrochemicals until 1993) works on the A62 in Huddersfield; it makes herbicides and cyhalothrin insecticide

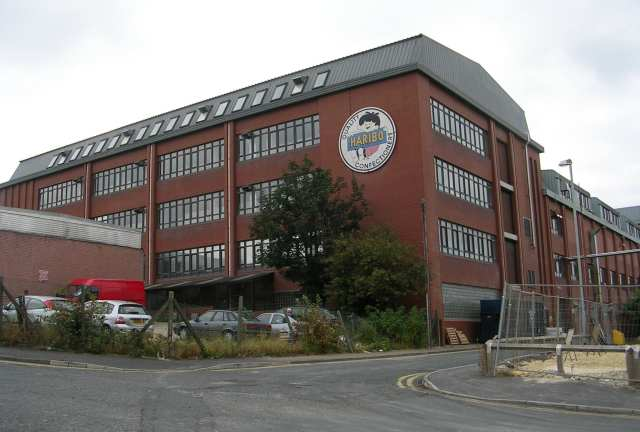
Haribo factory in Pontefract on the A639 in the centre of the town near Tanshelf station

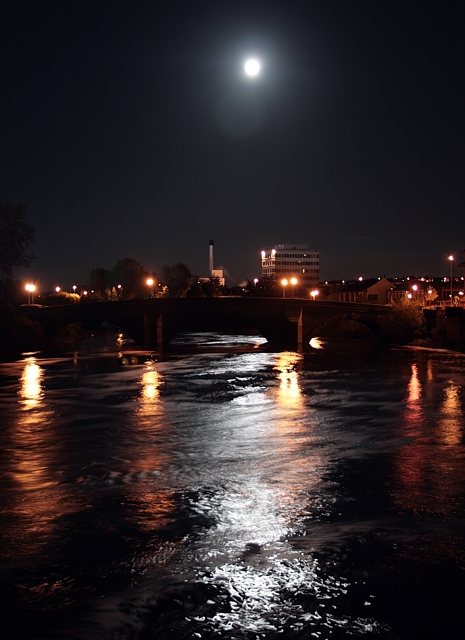
Former Castleford Nestlé factory in 2008

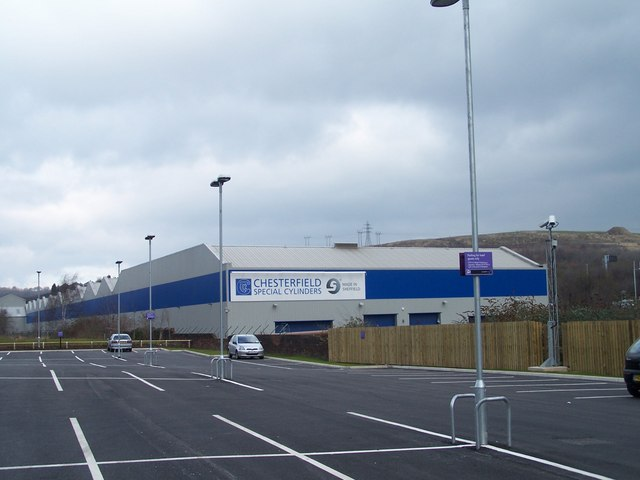
Chesterfield Special Cylinders, directly north of Meadowhall on the B6082, on the former site of the historic Yorkshire Engine Company

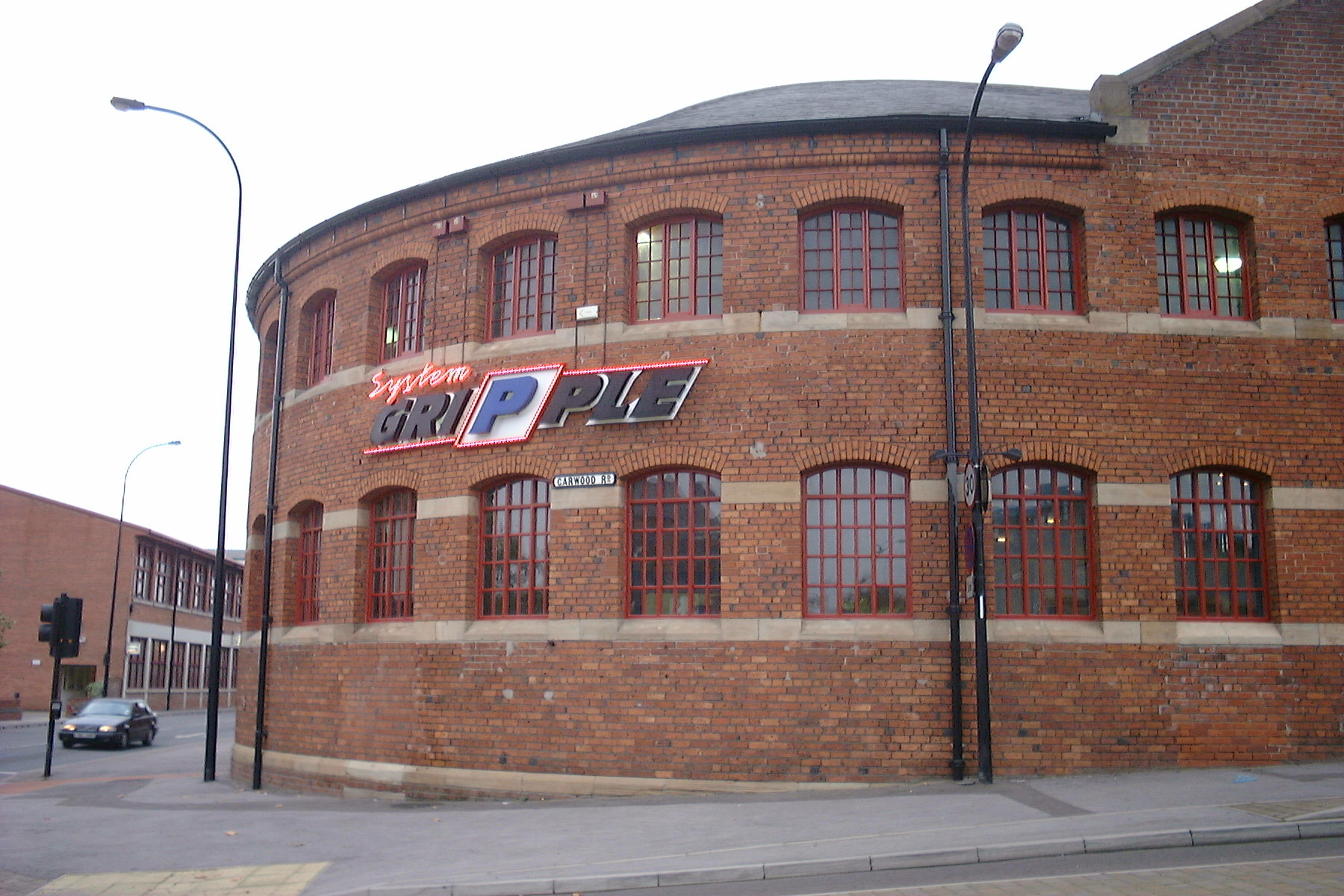
Gripple factory on the A6109 in Burngreave

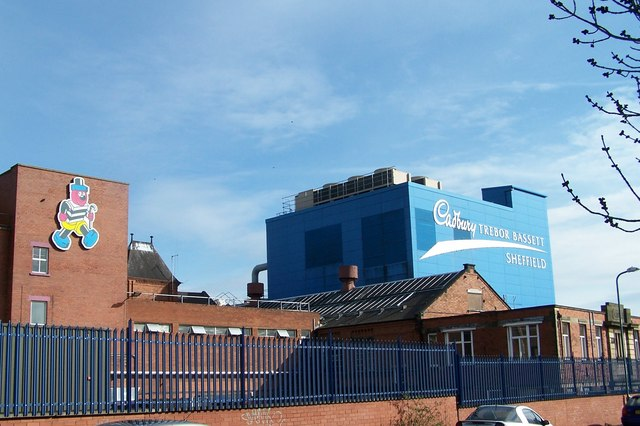
Cadbury Trebor Bassett at the former Bassett's factory in Owlerton

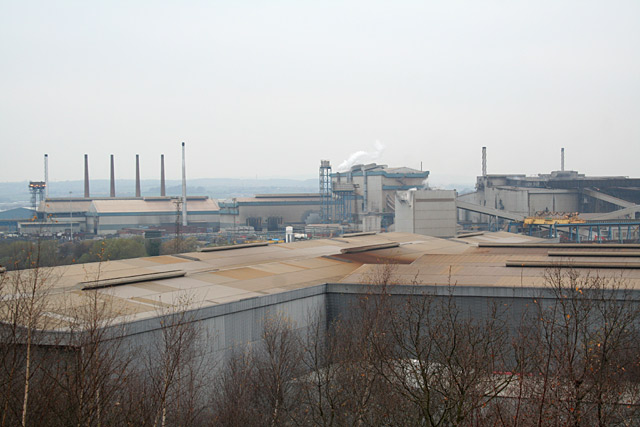
Liberty Speciality Steels Primary Mill continuous casting site in Aldwarke (Rotherham) in December 2007

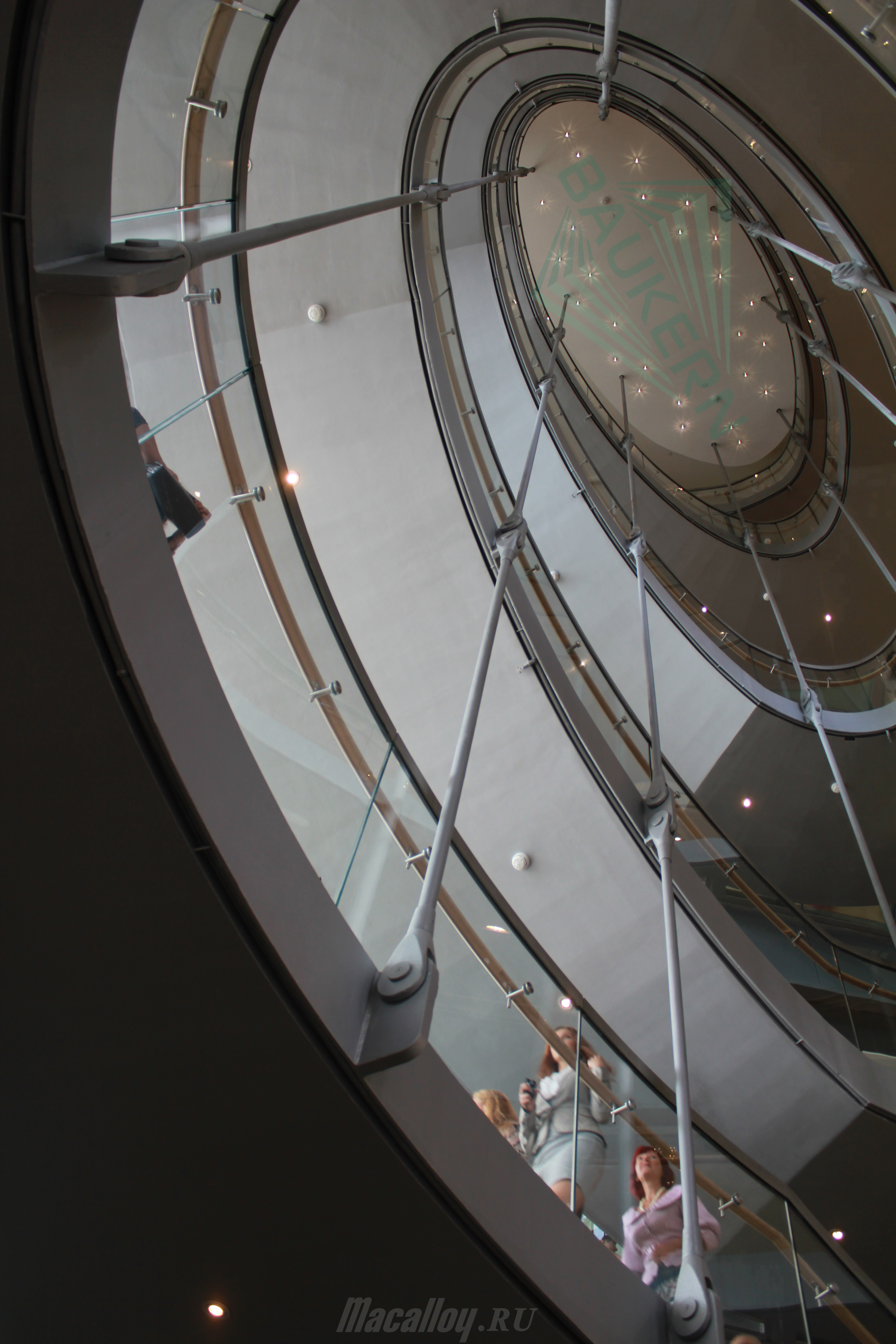
Macalloy threaded tension bar at Mariinsky Theatre in Russia

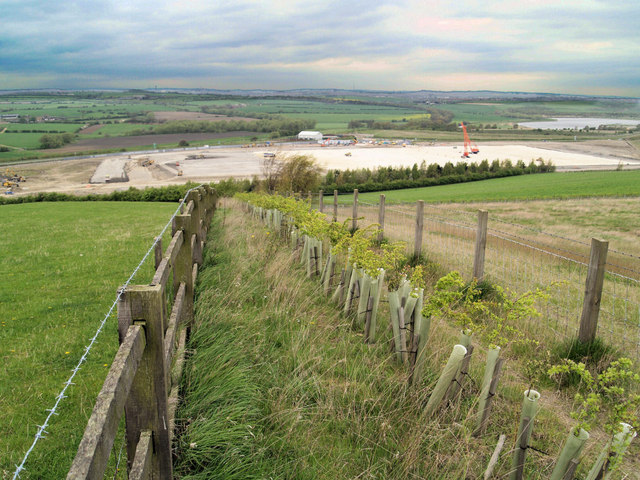
ASOS distribution centre (former Prologis before 2010) being built in 2006 at Little Houghton

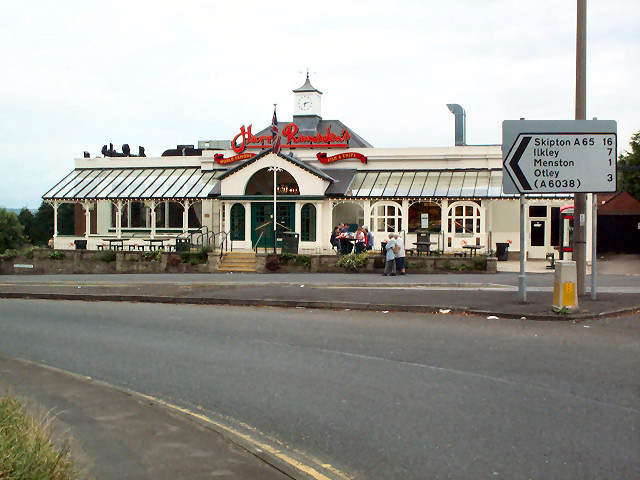
Harry Ramsden's in Guiseley

== Education ==
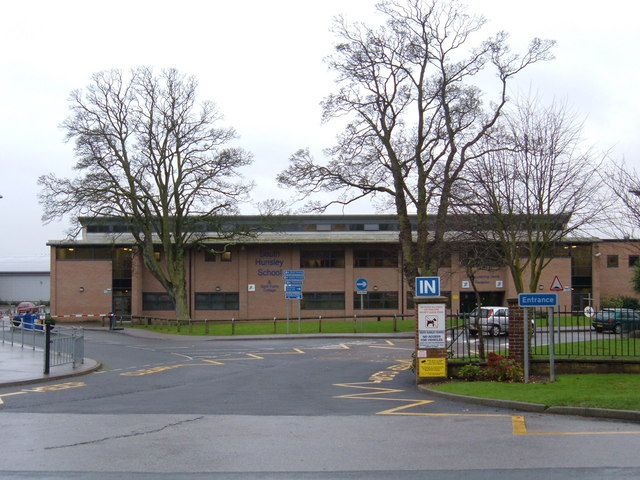
South Hunsley School

There are 15 local education authorities in the Yorkshire and Humber region. The schools in each authority are listed in the following –

- List of schools in Barnsley
- List of schools in Bradford
- List of schools in Calderdale
- List of schools in Doncaster
- List of schools in the East Riding of Yorkshire
- List of schools in Kingston upon Hull
- List of schools in Kirklees
- List of schools in Leeds
- List of schools in North East Lincolnshire
- List of schools in North Lincolnshire
- List of schools in North Yorkshire
- List of schools in Rotherham
- List of schools in Sheffield
- List of schools in Wakefield
- List of schools in York

=== Secondary education ===
Schools are mostly comprehensive, with some grammar schools in North Yorkshire, Calderdale and Kirklees.

There are around 235,000 at the region's secondary schools, the 4th lowest for English regions. The region has the highest overall truancy rate in England for both urban and rural areas. Inside the region for districts, Leeds has the highest rate with 6.9% persistent truants at secondary school, then Hull is second with 6.3%. Calderdale has the lowest truancy rate for unitary authorities, almost half that of Leeds, followed by North Lincolnshire. For districts Craven has the lowest rate.

The schools in Hull have often performed among the worst (on average) in England at GCSE after Knowsley in Merseyside. To Hull's credit, three schools in its LEA get above-average GCSE results whereas Knowsley usually has none (it managed two in 2010). Also at GCSE, schools in Barnsley and Bradford have low-achieving results with Barnsley the worst of these, and the lowest in the region in 2010. All three of these areas coincidentally have an above-average teenage pregnancy problem. In past years, Doncaster would be included in this group, but has managed to perform much better. For the metropolitan areas, Calderdale and Wakefield consistently perform the best, with both above the England average. Rotherham usually has the best results in South Yorkshire, but in 2010 it was Doncaster. York and North Yorkshire consistently perform the best at GCSE in the region, and with the East Riding of Yorkshire have results above the UK average.

Schoolchildren in Kingston upon Hull are most likely not to pass any GCSEs – over 6% with Bradford having a similar proportion, closely followed by Sheffield and North East Lincolnshire. The East Riding of Yorkshire and North Lincolnshire have the fewest not passing any GCSEs, followed by York.

For OFSTED inspections across England, the region has the highest proportion of schools (2.7%) with bad behaviour and the lowest proportion (16.3%) of schools with good behaviour. South West England has the best behaving schoolchildren. Inside the region, Hull has the highest proportion (16.7%) of schools with bad behaviour – the worst in England (Wandsworth and Bristol come joint second) – and York schools have the highest proportion (30%) of schools with outstanding behaviour.

At A-level North Lincolnshire, Kirklees, Hull, York and North Yorkshire perform quite well with Kirklees consistently being the best by a large margin and one of the highest in England, all having results above the England average. Wakefield and Calderdale were also close to the England average. The excellent Kirklees result is due to Greenhead College in Huddersfield, and North Lincolnshire's results are due to the John Leggott College, also a sixth form college. The districts of South Yorkshire perform the least in the area at A-level with Rotherham having the best results in this area, slightly below-average, and the other three districts achieve similar results, much lower than those in the former districts of Humberside. Leeds and Bradford now get the lowest results in West Yorkshire.

For both A-level and GCSE, Barnsley and Bradford are very low performing, with Barnsley usually getting the lowest A-level results in the region, but in 2010 North East Lincolnshire came bottom with unusually low results. Hull and northern Lincolnshire have a wide socio-economic diversity – many under-achieving pupils at 16 but with high performers at A-level. Hull, although much worse at GCSE, outperforms the East Riding of Yorkshire at A-level.

School children in North Yorkshire (with York and Kirklees) are the most likely to go to university – they also get the best A level results, and those in the East Riding of Yorkshire are likely to go to university, but get lower overall A level results.

=== Colleges ===
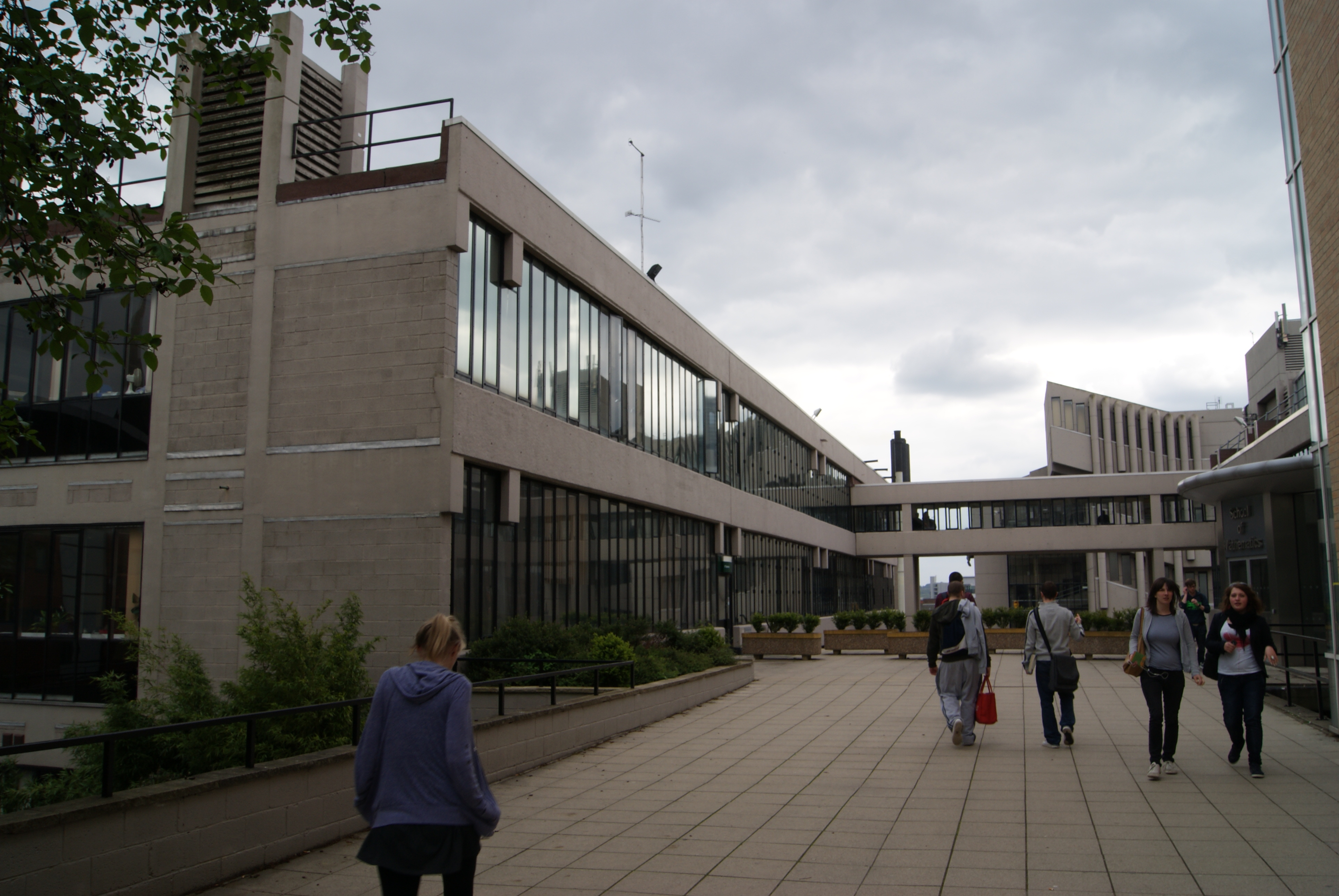
The University of Leeds – looking towards the Roger Stevens Building

There are twenty-seven FE colleges. The main five colleges are Bradford College, East Riding College, Doncaster College, Grimsby Institute, and Hull College.

=== Universities ===
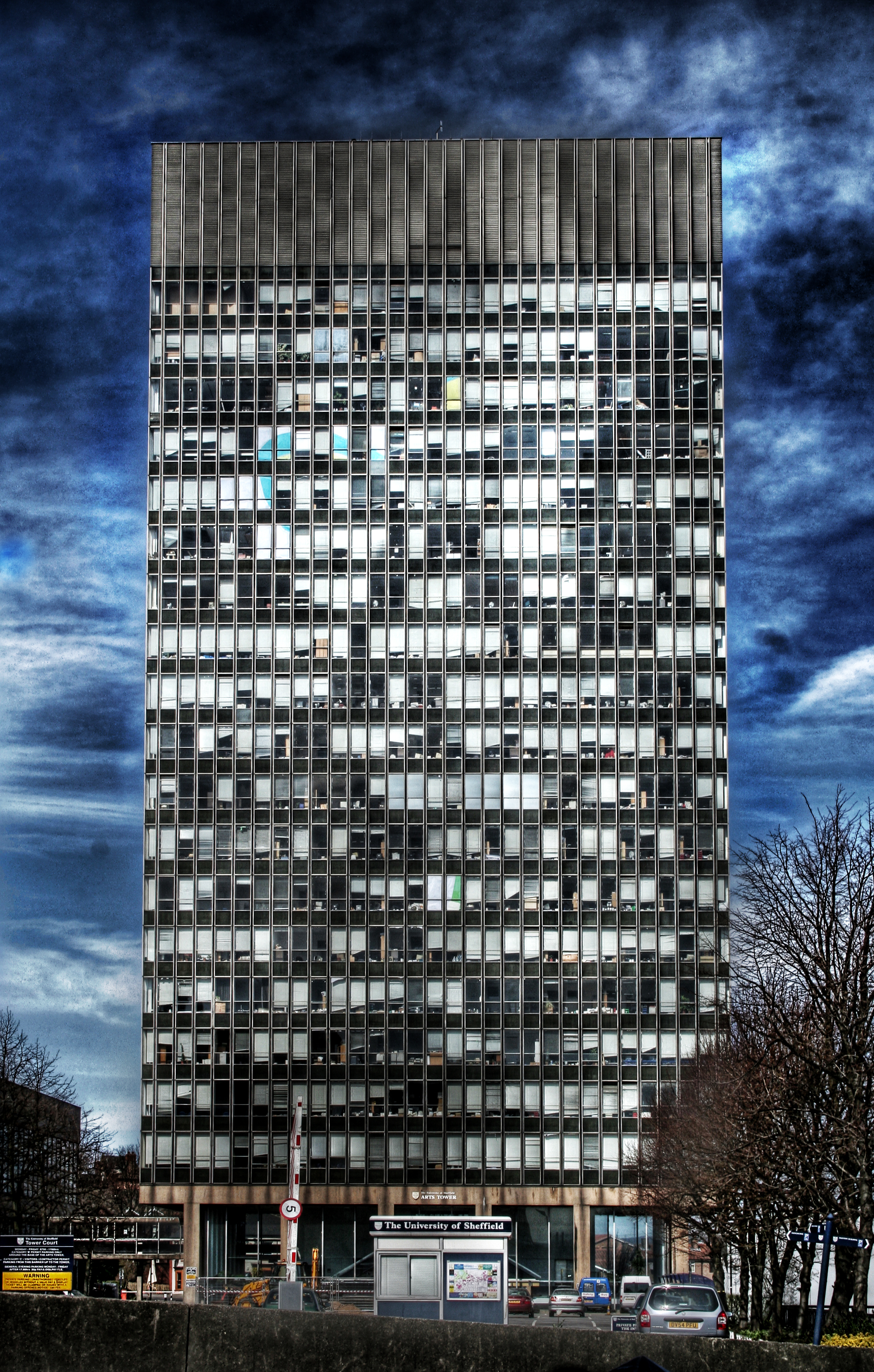
The University of Sheffield's Arts Tower (1966) is the tallest university building in the UK at 78 metres (255 ft), although Imperial College's decorative Queen's Tower is 87 metres (287 ft) and the University of Birmingham's clock tower is around 100 metres (330 ft)

There are ten universities and three higher education colleges in Yorkshire and the Humber, along with (in 2007) 27 Further Education colleges teaching some Higher Education courses.

The Krebs Cycle was discovered at the University of Sheffield in 1937. Liquid crystal displays were developed by the University of Hull in 1972, in conjunction with the Royal Radar Establishment in Worcestershire. Low fat spreads were developed at the University of Leeds (in conjunction with Unilever) in the 1980s, and in the 1930s William Astbury's x-ray diffraction experiments at the university started the road to the discovery of the double helix structure.

Sheffield Hallam University is the largest in the region with 37,000 students, but does not have the most funding. The University of Leeds is not too far behind. The University of York, a large collegiate university, gets much less funding than Leeds and Sheffield, but has quite a high research grant for its size, about half that of Leeds or Sheffield. The other universities do not have large research grants. Leeds and Sheffield have around twice as much total income than any other university. York and Bradford are the two smallest universities.

== Local media ==
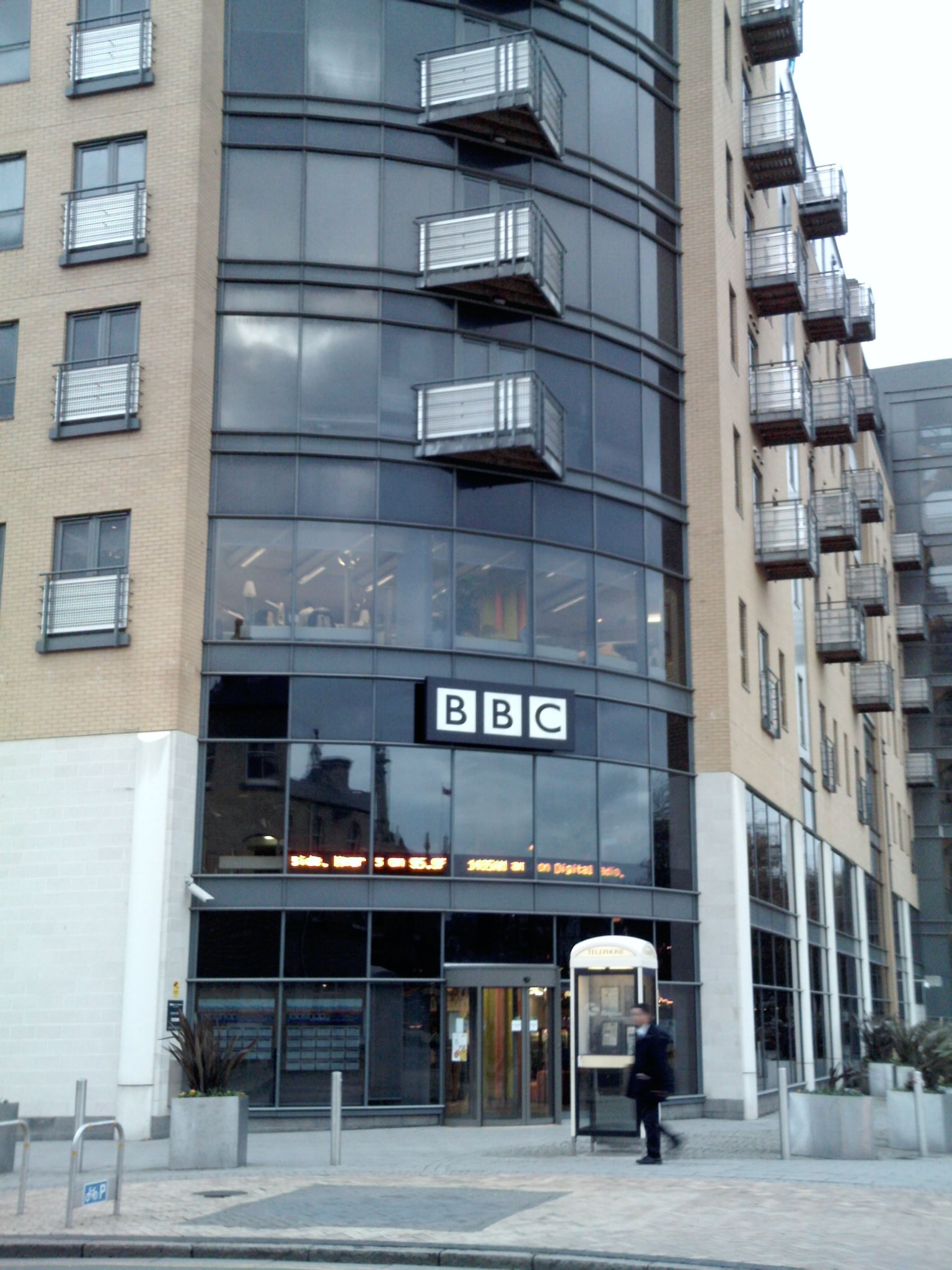
BBC in Queen's Gardens, Hull

=== Television ===
The region receives various regional television programmes:

- BBC Look North in Leeds that covers West, South and North Yorkshire.
- BBC Look North in Hull which covers the East Riding of Yorkshire, North and North East Lincolnshire.
- BBC Look North in Newcastle that covers parts of North Yorkshire including Whitby, Northallerton and Richmond.
- BBC North West Tonight in Salford covering western Craven in North Yorkshire such as Settle.
- ITV Yorkshire is on Kirkstall Road to the west of Leeds city centre, which broadcasts Calendar that covers the whole region.
- ITV Granada and ITV Tyne Tees also cover parts of the region.

Digital switchover took place in August 2011 for most of the region, with Emley Moor (the main TV transmitter for West, South and North Yorkshire) converting to digital in mid-September. Emley Moor is the tallest free-standing structure in the UK, and the 25th tallest in the world, and was designed by Ove Arup. The original tower famously collapsed in March 1969.

=== Radio ===
High Hunsley transmitter covers most of the region and overlap into other regions. Local commercial stations include Hits Radio West Yorkshire (Bradford), Greatest Hits Radio Yorkshire, Hits Radio South Yorkshire (Sheffield), Heart Yorkshire (Tingley), Capital Yorkshire and 107.8 Beverley FM.

BBC Local Radio services in the region include stations for Humberside, Leeds, Sheffield, York and Tees which serves Whitby.

National radio is broadcast from Belmont in the south-east, Bilsdale for North Yorkshire, and Holme Moss for South and West Yorkshire. Moorside Edge east of Scammonden Water near the M62 is a main 5 Live transmitter on 909 MW.

=== News and other print ===
Polestar Petty in central Leeds, with web offset, for many years printed TVTimes, Radio Times, and many colour supplements, including the Daily Mail weekend magazine, but closed in December 2014.

Local newspapers are the Bradford Telegraph and Argus, Evening Courier, Grimsby Telegraph, Huddersfield Examiner, Hull Daily Mail, The Scarborough News, Scunthorpe Telegraph, Sheffield Star, The Press (York), Wakefield Express, Yorkshire Evening Post and Yorkshire Post.

RR Donnelley UK Directory of Flaxby Moor, printed the Yellow Pages, until the site closed at the end of 2015. Polestar Chantry, off the A650 on the Wakefield 41 estate, prints Marie Claire, Good Housekeeping, Woman's Weekly, Real Life, BBC Good Food, BBC Gardeners' World, Prima, Woman & Home, Red, and Country Life. Polestar Sheffield prints the Telegraph magazine, and Hello!.
