= Europerf =

European Perforators Association
- Abbreviation: Europerf
- Formation: 1962
- Type: Trade association
- Legal status: Non-profit company
- Purpose: To represent the European metal perforating industry
- Headquarters: Diamant Building
- Location: Boulevard Auguste Reyers 80, B-1030 Brussels
- Region served: Europe
- Members: 17 members
- President: Patrick Glöckner
- Main organ: Europerf General Assembly and Board
- Website: europerf
- Remarks: secretary general is Olivier JANIN

The European Perforators Association, commonly known as Europerf, is the European association for the metal perforating industry.

== History ==
Europerf was established in 1962. It is a not-for-profit association.

== Structure ==
It represents 17 members in 11 EU member states. Perforated metal is used in many industries including food processing, building, vehicles and the chemical industry.

Europerf is located in Brussels, Belgium, in the same building as Pneurop, Comité Européen de l'Industrie de la Robinetterie, European Federation of Materials Handling or Orgalime.

Its annual meeting, organised by the Europerf secretariat, is held every year in May/June. The 2012 edition took place in Lisbon, Portugal, when Europerf elected a new president, Hans-Ulrich Koch, and vice president, Fred Graepel. The former president was Richard Bunker.

== Perforated metal use ==
Perforated metal is used in construction (e.g. facade), in industrial and food processing industry (e.g. grain drying, seed grading), in the automobile industry or household appliances (e.g. dishwasher filters).

Perforated metal sheets found on buildings are mostly if not only made of stainless steel. In addition to its light weight, solar shading effects, light deflection, natural ventilation or noise reduction, it benefits from the intrinsic good points of stainless steel like resistance to corrosion or low LCA.

== Noise reduction ==
Europerf promotes the benefits of perforated metal sheets. For example, perforated metal cladding reduces sound levels.

== International co-operation ==
Europerf has links with similar associations worldwide like the Industrial Perforators Association (IPA) in the United States.
