= British Gear Association =

The British Gear Association (BGA) is the trade body (association) that represents the manufacture of gear equipment and mechanical power transmission in the United Kingdom.

== History ==
The BGA was formed in 1986 to replace the previous British Gear Manufacturers' Association, headquartered in central London; the BGMA worked with the Association of Hydraulic Equipment Manufacturers (which became the British Fluid Power Association) and the British Compressed Air Society. In the late 1980s, due to the level of research undertaken, West Germany was producing seven times the amount of transmission gearing than that of the UK.

The organisation was incorporated as a company in 1993.

== Structure ==
The organisation is currently headquartered at Newcastle University. In 1993, the company moved to Staffordshire from Birmingham. Much research has been done in power transmission at the university's National Gear Metrology Laboratory (NGML).

The organisation is part of EUROTRANS, also known as the European Committee of Associations of Manufacturers of Gears and Transmission Parts, the European trade association for gear and transmission manufacturers, and works with Orgalim. Equivalent European organisations are VDMA in Germany, and Artema in France.

== Function ==
The organisation represents companies that make transmission equipment, such as differentials for the automotive industry. It organises industry seminars and conferences; its annual conference is held in mid-November.

== See also ==
- American Gear Manufacturers Association
