= Europump =

European Pump Manufacturers Association
- Abbreviation: Europump
- Formation: 1960
- Type: Trade association
- Legal status: Non-profit company
- Purpose: The European pump manufacturing industry
- Headquarters: BluePoint Brussels
- Location: Boulevard Auguste Reyers 80, B-1030 Brussels
- Region served: Europe
- Members: 18 national trade associations
- President: Dr Soenke BRODERSEN
- Main organ: Europump General Assembly and Council (Board)
- Affiliations: Orgalime associate member
- Website: europump
- Remarks: secretary general is Guy VAN DOORSLAER

The European Pump Manufacturers Association, mostly known as Europump, is the European association for pump manufacturers.

== History ==
Europump, the European Association of Pump Manufacturers, was established in 1960.

== Structure ==
It represents 18 National Associations in 15 EU Member States, Turkey, Russia & Switzerland. Europump members represent more than 450 companies with a collective production worth more than €10 billion and employing 100,000 people in Europe. The ever-improving performance of liquid pumps increases the productivity of end user sectors and contributes to competitiveness and growth. It is located in the same building as Pneurop, Comité Européen de l'Industrie de la Robinetterie or Orgalime.

These industries cover products such as water pumps, circulators, waste water pumps, pumps for the chemical industry or agriculture.

The constituent organisations include:

- (Austria) FMMI Fachverband MASCHINEN & METALLWAREN Industrie
- (Belgium) Agoria
- (Czech Republic) Czech Pump Manufacturers' Association - CPMA
- (Denmark) Association of Danish Pump Manufacturers
- (Germany) VDMA - Fachverband Pumpen + Systeme
- (Finland) The Federation of Finnish Technology Industries
- (France) Profluid - Association française des pompes et agitateurs, des compresseurs et de la robinetterie
- (Greece) Union of Greek Metal Industries
- (Italy) ASSOPOMPE
- (Netherlands) Holland Pomp Groep
- (Poland) PL STOWARZYSZENIE PRODUCENTÓW POMP
- (Romania) RO APPR
- (Russia) RU Russian Pump Manufacturers' Association - RPMA
- (Spain) ES Asociacion Espanola de Fabricantes de Bombas para Fluidos
- (Sweden) SWEPUMP The Swedish Pump Supplier’s Association
- (Switzerland) The Swiss Mechanical and Electrical Engineering Industries
- (Turkey) POMSAD - Türk Pompa ve Vana Sanayicileri Derneği (Turkish Pump & Valve Manufacturers' Association)
- (United Kingdom) The British Pump Manufacturers' Association (BPMA)

== Function ==
It holds its annual meeting in April/May. The 2012 edition took place in Stresa, Italy. It is organised by ASSOPOMPE, the Italian association.

== Pumps ==
In addition to pumps, Europump is also dealing with circulators

== Ecodesign ==
Pumps are subject and will be subject to EU ecodesign regulations As from 1 January 2013, the circulator Regulation will come into force. Europump organised a conference on Ecodesign on 6 October 2011 to discuss with stakeholders (including the European Commission) about ecodesign and pumps. Europump has developed a three pronged approach : Product Approach, Extended Product Approach, Systems Approach Efficiency of pumps is a major area of work at Europump

The next challenges for Europump is to deal with the four next Ecodesign lots ( lot 28 to 31)

Regulation No 547/2012 of 25 June 2012 implementing Directive 2009/125/EC of the European Parliament and of the Council with regard to ecodesign requirements for water pumps stipulates the minimum efficiency requirements for water pumps as set out under the ecodesign Directive for energy related products. This Regulation mainly concerns manufacturers of water pumps placing these products on the European market. However customers may also be affected. Europump has created a guideline to clarify questions which may arise with the entry into force of the water pumps Regulation EU 547/2012. There are two ecodesign requirements: the minimum efficiency requirements represented by an index called ‘minimum efficiency index’ or MEI as well as information requirements for rotodynamic water pumps such as the efficiency graphs. From 1 January 2013, water pumps shall have a minimum efficiency index of MEI ≥ 0.1 and from 1 January 2015, water pumps shall have an even stricter minimum efficiency index of MEI ≥ 0.4; from 1 January 2013, the information on water pumps shall comply with the requirements.
