= Profluid =

Profluid is the French association of manufacturers of pumps and mixers, compressors and valves.

In 2011, the valve sector has represented a turnover of more than 2.7 billion euros; for the pump sector, the turnover was 2.3 billion euros; finally the turnover of compressor sector was 1.6 billion euros (info INSEE 2011). All these sectors are exporters.

The professional activities represented by 'Profluid' have 170 companies and employed 28 000 persons in 2011 . Main mission of the trade association is to represent its members in discussions with the administration (French and/or European). PROFLUID also has a networking role : between members and with the end-user organizations. Besides, the association is heavily involved in the development of concrete actions for reducing the environmental impact and carbon footprint of the products for its members. They participated in the development of an ecodesign methodology for mechanical products, which was published in France and is being adapted at European level. Regulatory matters such has the Ecodesign Directive, REACH Regulation or the Construction Products Regulation are also regular sources of action.

Internationally, members and representatives of 'Profluid' sit and contribute:

- in several standardization committees within the ISO,
- and European sectoral committees such as Europump, Pneurop and Comité Européen de l'Industrie de la Robinetterie.

For reference website Profluid

== See also ==
Europe Orgalime
Belgium Agoria
Germany VDMA - Compressors, Compressed Air and Vacuum Technology
Italy ANIMA
England British Compressed Air Society Limited (BCAS)
Federation of manufacturers of compressors and vacuum pumps in Europe Pneurop

ISO International Organization for Standardization ISO
