= Bench (furniture) =

Type of long seat

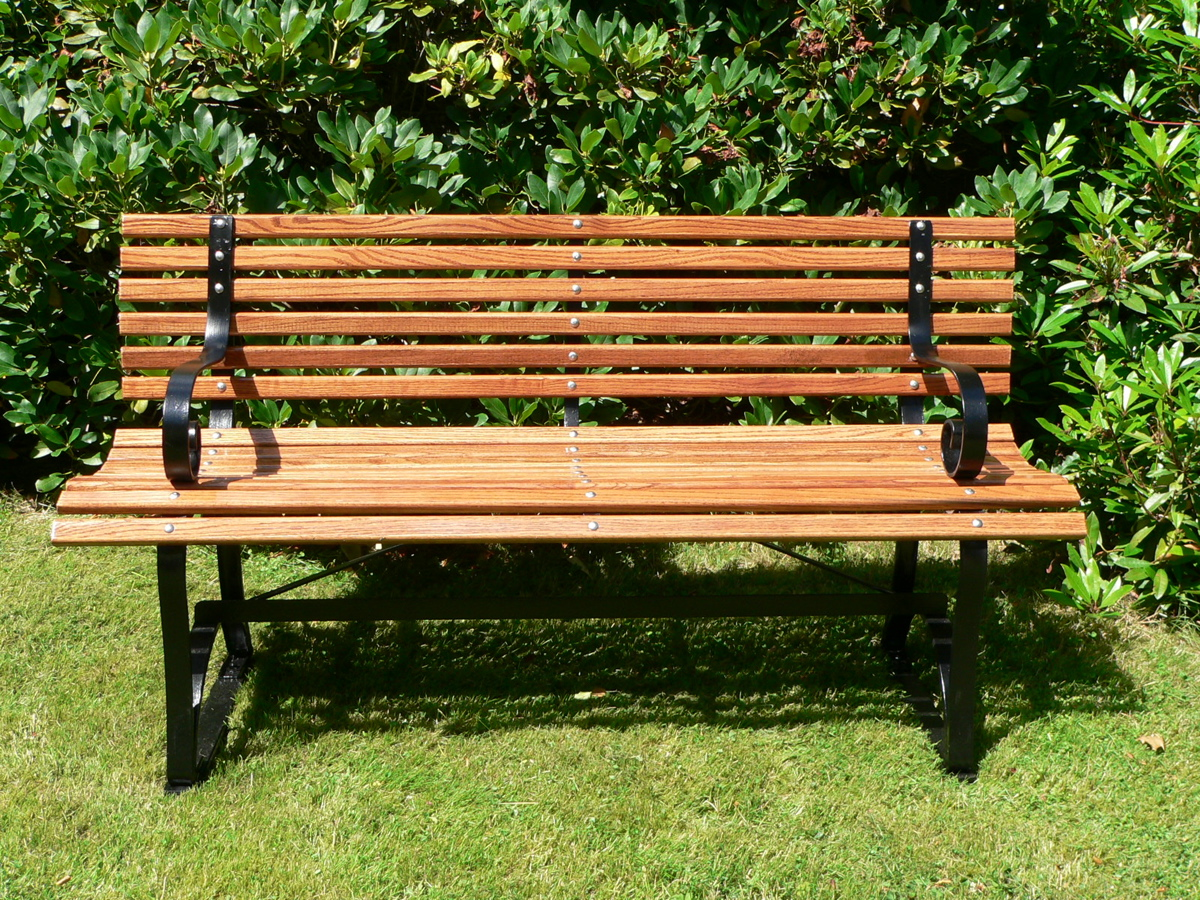
Classic garden bench

A bench is a long seat on which several people may sit at the same time. Benches are typically made of wood, but may also be made of metal, stone, or synthetic materials. Many benches have back rests, while others do not and can be accessed from either side. Arm rests are another common feature. In many American public areas, benches may be donated by persons or associations, as indicated by an affixed plaque, a common form of memorial to a deceased person (see memorial bench). Memorial benches can also be found in other countries. Benches may be placed outdoors or indoors, but are more often found outdoors.

== Etymology ==
The term bench originates from the Proto-Germanic word bankon, a cognate with the word bank. It was borrowed into Old English as benc, originally meaning a long seat typically without a back. In Middle English, the word took on its modern form of bench.

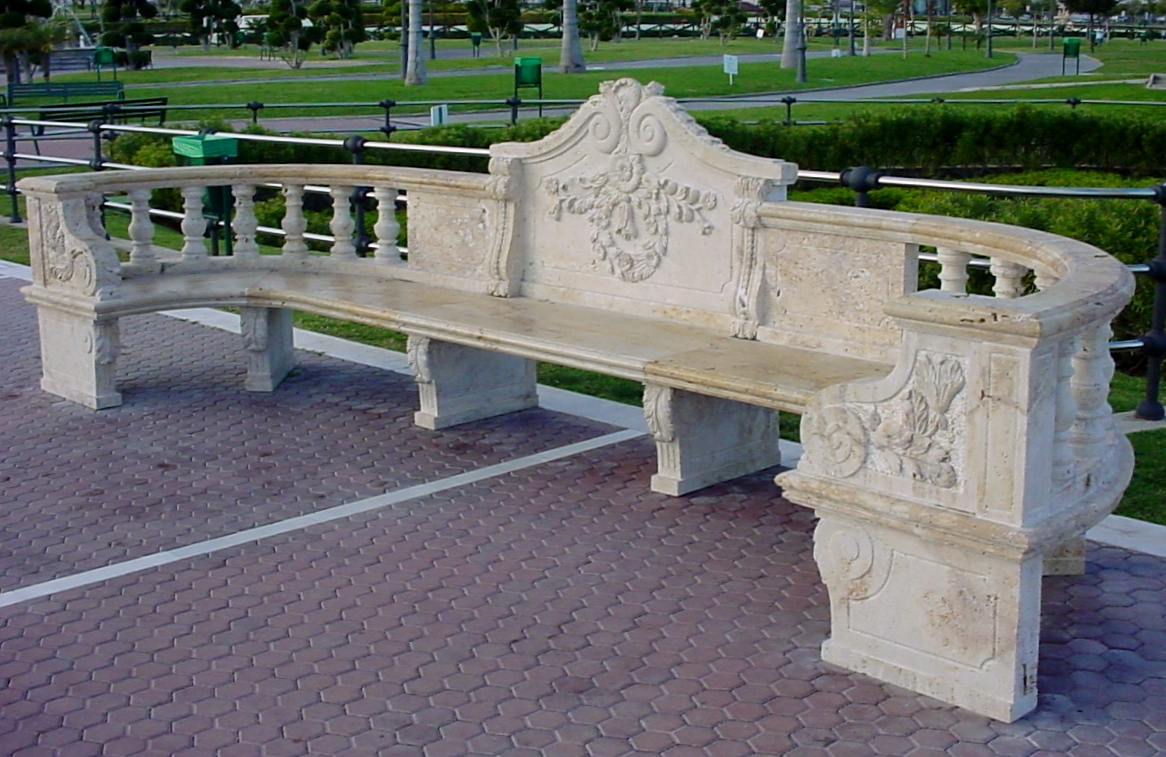
Stone bench in Parque de Bateria in Torremolinos, Spain

== Types ==
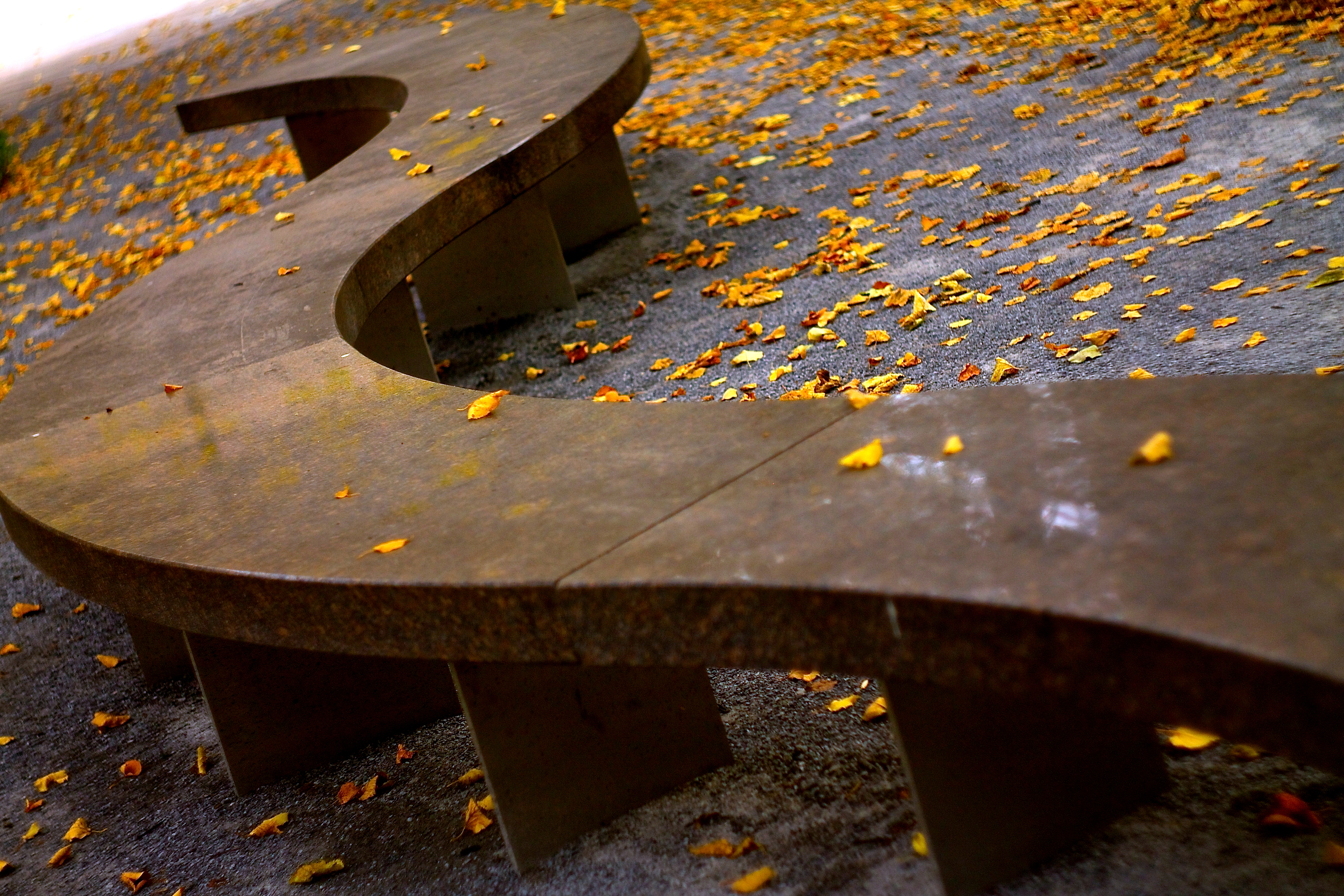
A long, curved and backless bench

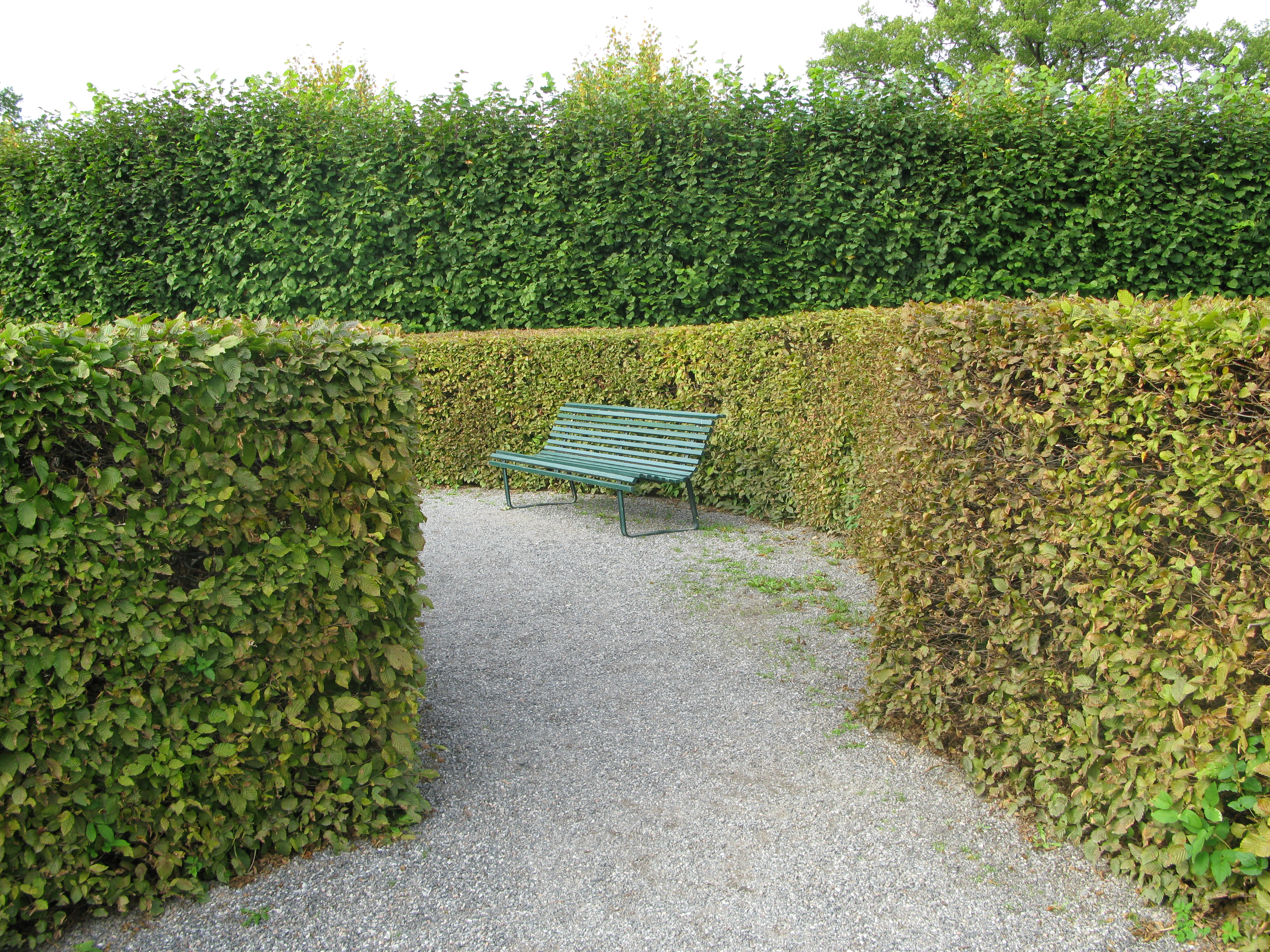
A park bench in the Drottningholm Palace park

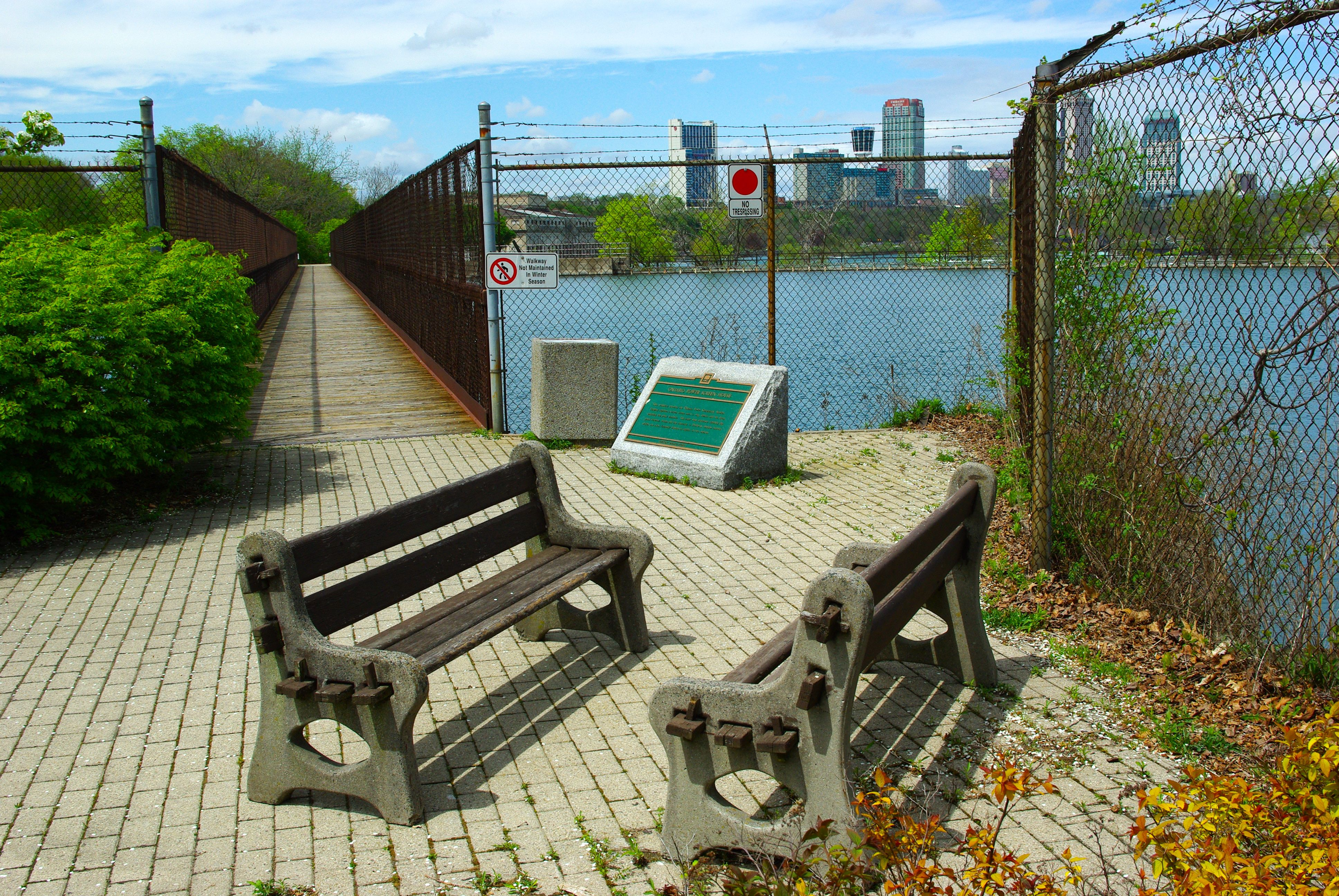
Benches facing each other in Niagara Falls, Ontario

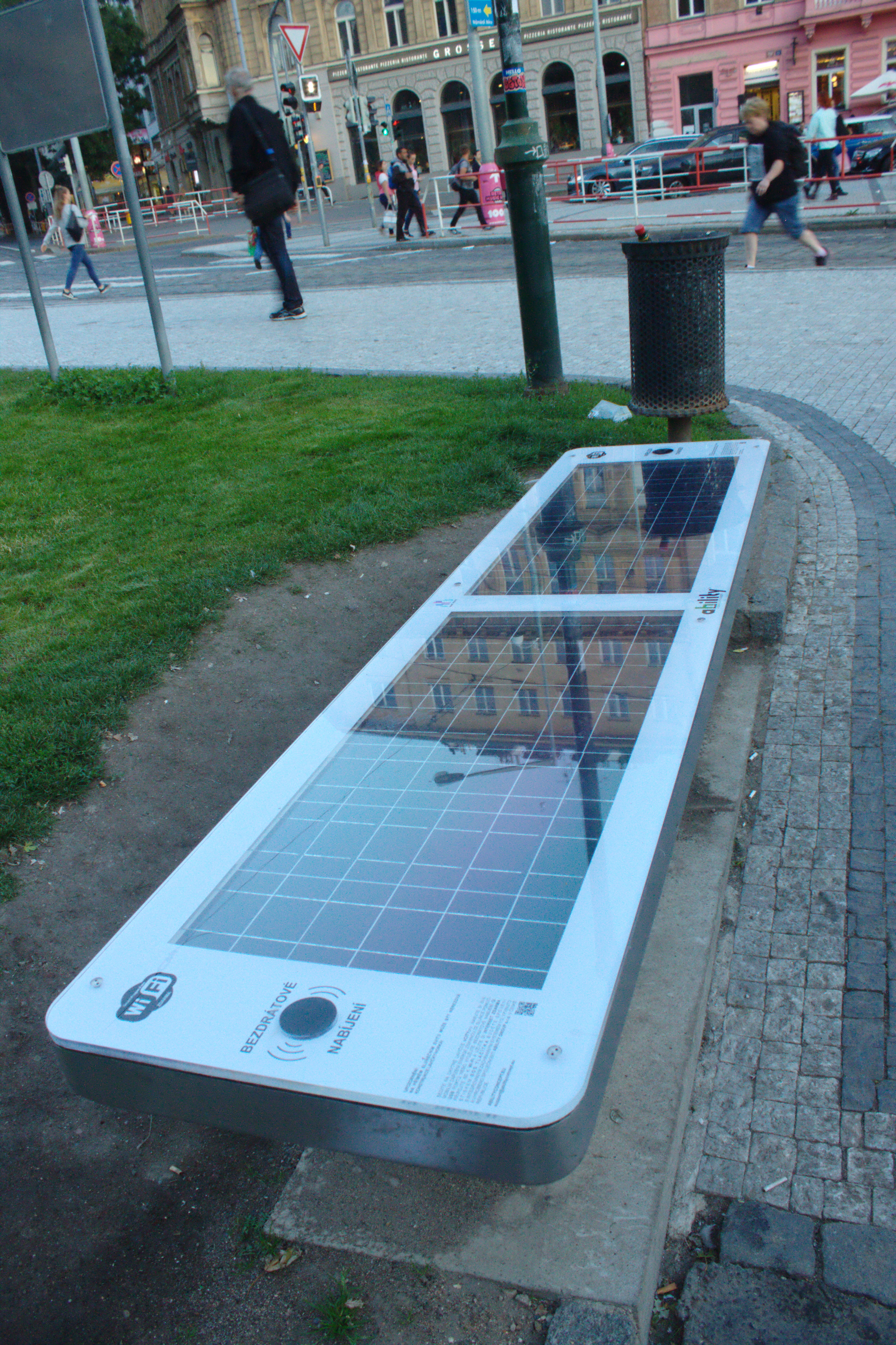
Solar smart bench with Wi-Fi

Often, benches are simply named for the place they are used, regardless of whether this implies a specific design.

- Park benches are set as seating places within public parks, and vary in the number of people they can seat.
- Garden benches are similar to public park benches, but are longer and offer more sitting places.
- Picnic tables, or catering buffet tables, have benches as well as a table. These tables may have table legs which are collapsible, in order to expedite transport and storage.
- Scenic benches are situated to provide a more comfortable means of enjoying the contemplation of a beautiful landscape, a busy street scene, or less commonly a specific event.
- Perch benches are usually situated in high traffic areas to enable people to take a quick break.
- A storage bench is a combination of sitting space and a storage box, often used for keeping gardening supplies or grill equipment.
- A form is a backless bench that was used for seating in dining rooms, school rooms and law courts — can be leather or upholstered fabric with or without a back rest.
- Wooden benches in early railway passenger cars

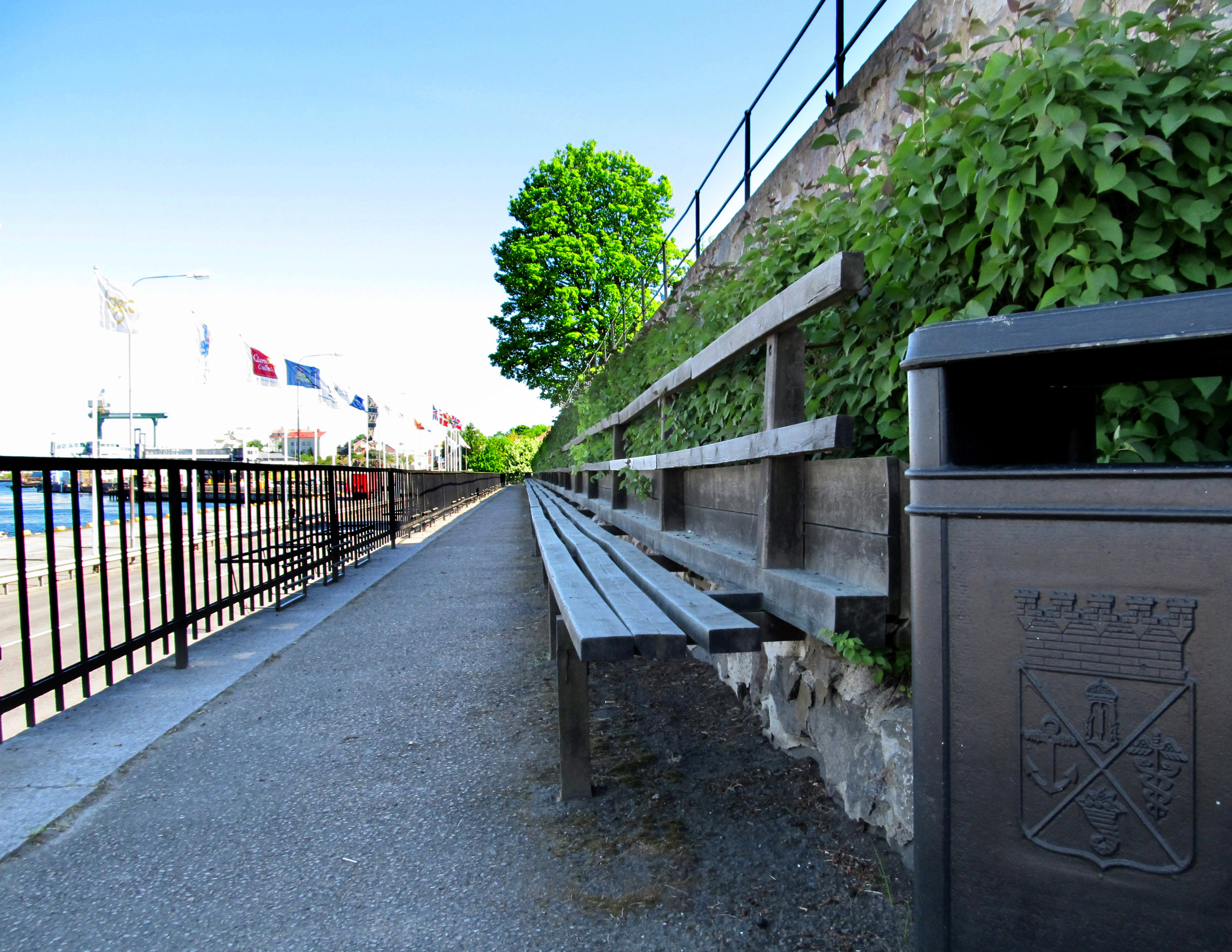
Långa Soffan, a 240-foot (73 m) park bench in Oskarshamn, Sweden

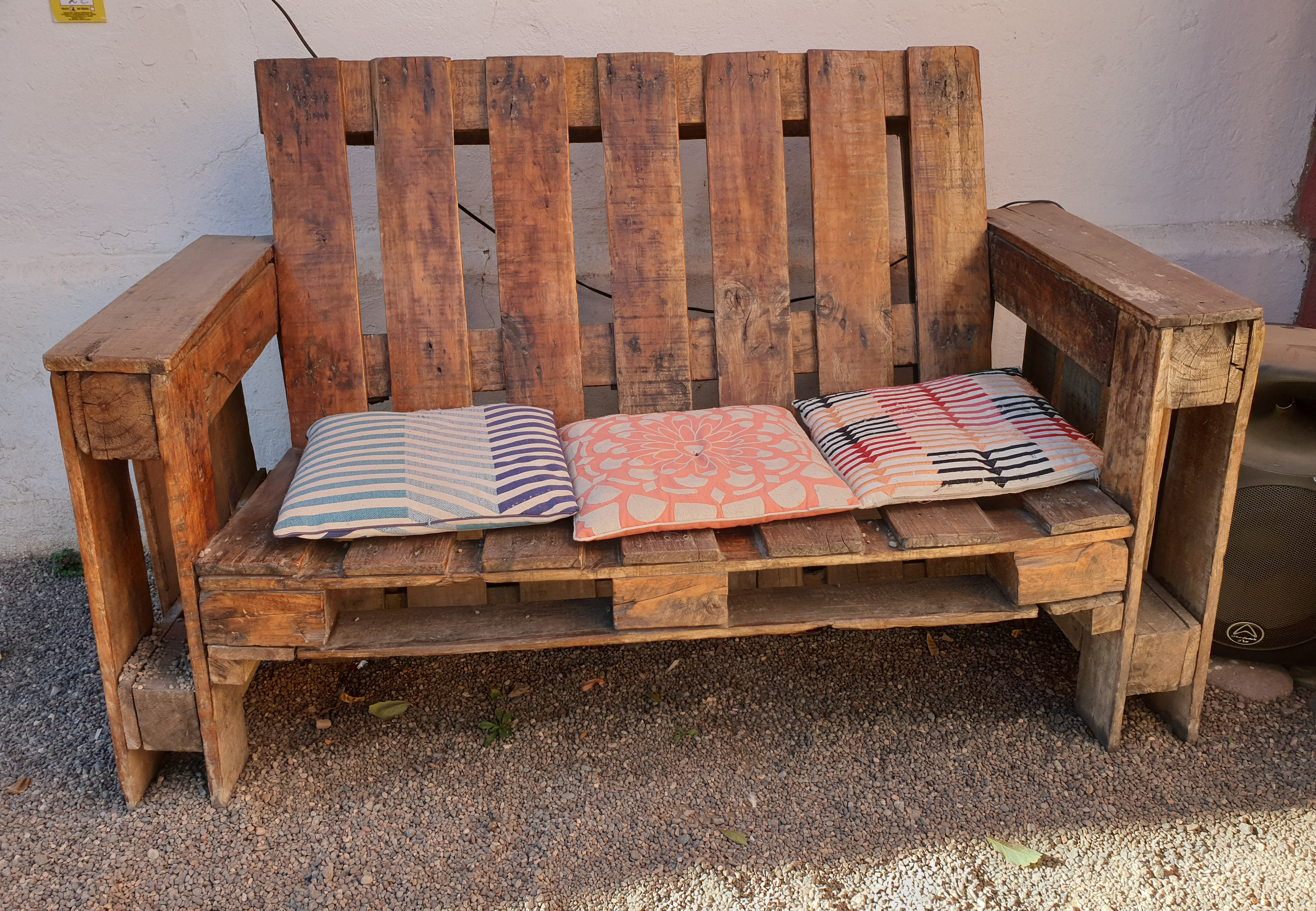
A bench made from pallets

Various types of benches are specifically designed for and/or named after specific uses, such as:

- Leaning benches, or "leaners", have been installed by some cities for people to rest against in public areas where there is no room for regular benches.
- Church benches and pews inside places of worship, which are sometimes equipped with an additional kneeling bench. Church benches and pews can come in various styles including traditional, modern and curved to match and complement the architectural styles and spaces of places of worship.
- a bench seat is a traditional seat installed in automobiles, featuring a continuous pad running the full width of the cabin.
- a utility bench is used for fitness exercises, such as the bench press which is named after its use of a bench
- a communion bench is not used as a seat
- a piano bench usually offers one person seating, but there are also two-person variants allowing for pair-playing
- swing seats are independently movable, suspended benches, used for play or as a relaxing porch swing.
- Glider Benches are similar to Swing Seats but are not suspended; instead they have a mechanism under the seating area that allows the bench to rock back and forward
- a courting bench (or kissing bench, or tête-à-tête): a two-seater with the seats pointing in opposite directions, thus almost facing each other.
- a buddy bench (or friendship bench) in a school playground is where a child can go when they want someone to talk to.
- the bench in a courtroom, behind which the judge is seated.

== Construction materials ==
Benches come in a variety of different materials, but there are some venue standards that account for use, durability, and maintenance patterns.

- Adobe: (banco) type benches are made of packed earth often combined with a binder, such as straw. They are found throughout the world in countries that use earth or mud construction techniques, in both outdoor and indoor settings.
- Aluminum: Aluminum benches are often found in outdoor, sideline settings at recreational venues like sports fields or courts and as a complement to bleacher systems. The material affords for a lightweight, corrosive-free bench, so it is a portable and economical option for indoor or outdoor settings.
- Cast iron: early outdoor benches were made of cast iron, Among the earliest in America were produced by the iron foundry Janes, Beebe & Co in the mid-19th century.
- Concrete: Concrete benches are very heavy and are a more permanent furnishing. They are often installed in facilities that are not expected to change or transition often, if at all, such as military bases, state parks and official buildings. Concrete is very durable, so it is appropriate for any climate. Concrete can be composed of many different materials to afford benches different accents, depending on what it is composed of.
- Fiberglass: Fiberglass is a versatile material so fiberglass benches can come in a variety of designs and finishes or colors. The material is great for indoor or outdoor use because it will not corrode or rust, is very low maintenance, and can be manufactured to complement any facility. Common places where fiberglass benches are installed include food courts, restaurants, and office buildings.
- Powder-coated steel: Powder coated steel benches are often found lining entryways for different venues, like retail centers, medical facilities and country clubs. While powder-coat is a common finish on many commercial site furnishings, it is often featured on strap metal benches because of its anti-corrosive qualities and ability to strongly bond to heavy duty steel constructions. Powder-coated benches also come in a variety of colors and designs, from classic strap metal benches to extremely intricate designs.
- Recycled plastic: Recycled plastic benches are low maintenance, available in a variety of colors and styles, and are appropriate for any environment, including typically-corrosive salty, ocean side facilities. Recycled plastic components can vary based on the manufacturer, but it is commonplace that a high percentage is post-consumer material and will contribute to LEED certification. For these reasons, they are commonly found at a wide range of venues, including convention centers, office buildings, universities, retail centers, schools and stadiums.
- Thermoplastic: Thermoplastic is an environmentally friendly coating for metal benches. Thermoplastic benches are very commonplace, located in facilities ranging from schools, parks, recreational spaces and office buildings. The material itself is graffiti resistant and easily repairable, as opposed to other metal coatings and, with a thorough coat, will help a metal bench withstand a variety of climates. There are endless color options and six different common pattern styles: expanded metal, perforated metal, strap style, welded wire, diamond pattern and rod style. Expanded metal is often seen in casual park settings, featuring a lattice-like look while strap style can be commonly featured trail side or embellishing a sidewalk.
- Wood: Wood benches are a very high maintenance option because they need to be regularly treated with an insect repellent or coated with polyurethane or similar coating to maximize the life of the material. They are typically found along walking trails and state parks, while high-quality wood products like teak, redwood and mahogany are commonly found in residential furniture lines, resorts and restaurant settings. Other common lumber furnishing materials include oak and southern yellow pine.

== See also ==
- Bench Around the Lake, an artwork by Jeppe Hein at the Indianapolis Museum of Art
- Buddy bench
- Camden bench
- Furniture
- Pew
- Prie-dieu
