= Beckert =

Beckert is a surname. Notable people with the surname include:

- Franz Beckert (1907–1973), German gymnast who competed in the 1936 Summer Olympics
- Glenn Beckert (1940–2020), American baseball player
- Jens Beckert (born 1967), German sociologist
- Lothar Beckert (1931–2017), German long-distance runner
- Patrick Beckert (born 1990), German Olympic speed skater
- Stephanie Beckert (born 1988), German speed skater
- Sven Beckert, American historians and Laird Bell Professor of American History at Harvard University
- Tom Beckert, American sound engineer

See also

- Groz-Beckert, is part of the Groz-Beckert Group based in Albstadt-Ebingen in Baden-Wuerttemberg, Germany
