= Travesti =

Travesti may refer to:

- Travesti (gender identity), a transgender identity in South America
- Travesti (theatre), a performance while wearing clothes of the opposite sex
- "Travesti", a section of Arca's 2020 single "@@@@@"

== See also ==
- Travesty (disambiguation)
- Transfem (disambiguation)
- Transvestism
