= BCAS =

BCAS can refer to:

- British Compressed Air Society
- Bureau of Civil Aviation Security (India)
- British Columbia Ambulance Service
