= BGA =

BGA may refer to:

== Organizations ==
- Battle Ground Academy, a private school in Franklin, Tennessee, US
- Behavior Genetics Association
- Better Government Association, investigative journalism organisation, based in Chicago
- Boldklubberne Glostrup Albertslund, a Danish football club
- British Gear Association
- British Gliding Association
- British Go Association
- British Geophysical Association
- British-German Association
- Bumitama Gunajaya Agro, an Indonesian palm oil company
- Bundesverband Großhandel, Außenhandel, Dienstleistungen (The Federation of German Wholesale, Foreign Trade and Services)

== Transport ==
- Brundall Gardens railway station, Norfolk, England, by National Rail station code
- Palonegro International Airport, Colombia, by IATA code

== Other uses ==
- Ball grid array, a type of surface-mount packaging used for integrated circuits
- Cyanobacteria (blue-green algae)
- Break glass alarm, a type of manually activated fire alarm; see Fire alarm pull station
- Bach-Gesellschaft Ausgabe, the first complete edition of Johann Sebastian Bach's compositions
- Boys Generally Asian (BgA), a parody K-Pop group
