= Wirquin (company) =

French plastics company

Wirquin is a French plastics company of plumbing fittings; it is a leader in European countries.

The company employs around 1,400 people and operates five factories and ten subsidiaries worldwide.

== History ==
The company was formed in 1977 as Wirquin Plastiques S.A. in Carquefou, in the Pays de la Loire region of western France.

In 2011 it bought CME Sanitary Systems in Doncaster in South Yorkshire, becoming Wirquin Limited.

This is a manufacturing site, with around two hundred employees, with around 180 in manufacturing.

== See also ==
- Comité Européen de l'Industrie de la Robinetterie
