= European Materials Handling Federation =

- Abbreviation: FEM
- Formation: 1960
- Type: Trade association
- Legal status: Non-profit company
- Purpose: Association of materials handling, lifting and storage equipment
- Headquarters: Diamant Building
- Location: Boulevard Auguste Reyers 80, B-1030 Brussels
- Region served: Europe
- Members: 15 national trade associations
- Main organ: FEM General Assembly and Executive Committee(Board)
- Website: www.fem-eur.com

The European Materials Handling Federation (French: Fédération Européenne de la Manutention, FEM), is the association representing material handling, lifting and storage equipment manufacturers in Europe.

== History ==
FEM was established in 1953 with two main purposes: (1) facilitating cooperation among materials handling manufacturers in Europe through their respective national committees and (2) creating state-of-the-art technical recommendations from the sector on the use of its equipment.

1993 marked an important change in FEM core activity with the establishment of the Internal Market (European Union) and the gradual increase in relevant regulatory requirements (firstly in the area of safety) originating from the EU. Consequently, in 2000 FEM Secretariat was moved to Brussels to be closer to the decision-making centre.

== Structure ==
It represents 15 National Associations in 13 EU Member States, plus Russia, Turkey and Iran. FEM members represent more than 1,000 companies that employ 160,000 people directly in Europe. The industry has an annual turnover of €62bn (2016). FEM office is located in the same building as Pneurop, Comité Européen de l'Industrie de la Robinetterie or Orgalime, of which it is Associate Member. FEM is one of the sector associations Orgalime offers services to.

FEM is organised in Product Groups that reflect the various industries under the materials handling heading: conveyors for bulk handling, crane and lifting equipment, elevating equipment, intralogistics systems, industrial trucks, mobile elevating work platforms, and racking and shelving.

The constituent organisations include:

- (Belgium) Agoria
- (Germany) VDMA -
- (Finland) The Federation of Finnish Technology Industries
- (France) CISMA
- (Italy) AISEM
- (Netherlands) DMH - Dutch Material Handling
- (Spain) FEM-AEM
- (Sweden) TEKNIKFÖRETAGEN
- (Russia) NRSEA
- (Turkey) ISDER
- (United Kingdom) BMHF

Since 2018, FEM President is Jos De Vuyst from the company STOW.

== Function ==
It holds a Congress every two years in the autumn. The last edition took place in Antwerp (2018). It was organised by AGORIA, the Belgian association. FEM is listed in the European Transparency Register.;

FEM is organised in working bodies (Executive Committee, Technical & Regulatory Committee, topical working groups) that meet on a regular basis and several times a year.

== Activities ==
A historical and still substantial part of FEM work lies in the production and update of technical recommendations on the use and maintenance of the various categories of materials handling equipment. FEM thus manages several dozens of recommendations.

The other main activity consists in defending and promoting the interests of European materials handling manufacturers towards EU decision-makers in the context of relevant EU legislation. FEM is thus monitoring regulatory developments in several areas such as exhaust emissions of non-road mobile machinery, machinery, noise of equipment used outdoor, energy efficiency, resource efficiency, market surveillance...

FEM also organises events (e.g. participation in CeMAT exhibition) and provides statistics on its industry to its members.

In 2014 FEM confounded the World Materials Handling Alliance with American (MHI), Chinese (CMES, BMHRI) and Japanese (JIMH) colleagues. The Alliance exchanges information on trends, standards and regulations in the world materials handling industry. It meets once a year in conjunction with a major trade exhibition.

== Products ==
Materials handling manufacturers produce mechanical equipment related to the movement, storage, control and protection of materials, goods and products throughout the process of manufacturing, distribution, consumption and disposal. Materials handling can be considered as an 'enabling' industry insofar as it fosters the efficiency of the various steps throughout the life cycle of products. Materials handling products are found in almost every manufacturing or distribution company. Materials handling has become more and more automated and integrated into complex systems.

Materials handling equipment covers a wide variety of products including cranes, dock levellers, forklift trucks, adjustable shelving and pallet racking, aerial work platform, vertical conveyors, etc.

== Market surveillance ==
Market surveillance consists in effective control, by responsible authorities, of products' compliance with applicable regulatory requirements. Insufficient market surveillance in the EU has been identified as a major risk for the industry. Indeed, whereas a lot of regulations and directives apply to materials handling products, some competitors do not comply with the rules thus creating an unfair market and affecting the environment, workers' health and products'safety. FEM is therefore cooperating with other machinery industries (e.g. CECE) to raise and address the issue at EU political level. FEM also created an Industry Support Platform together with the other trade associations to assist market surveillance authorities and market operators thanks to centralised technical guidance on conformity with various regulatory requirements. A

== Sources ==
http://www.cemat-network.com/en/partner-of-cemat-network/fem-european-federation-of-materials-handling.html https://web.archive.org/web/20110101221619/http://www.vdma.org/wps/portal/Home/en/Branchen/M/FOERD/Foerd_A07_20091202_FEM_documents_available_here_Foerdertechnik_en?WCM_GLOBAL_CONTEXT=%2Fwps%2Fwcm%2Fconnect%2Fvdma%2FHome%2Fen%2FBranchen%2FM%2FFOERD%2FFoerd_A07_20091202_FEM_documents_available_here_Foerdertechnik_en
