= FEM =

FEM or Fem may refer to:

== Arts and entertainment ==
- Fem (magazine), a feminist magazine
- FEM (TV channel), a Norwegian television channel
- Fem, a special-interest news magazine published by University of California, Los Angeles Student Media
- "Fem" (song), by Davido, 2020

== Organisations ==
- Fédération Européenne de la Manutention, French name for the European Materials Handling Federation
- Zimbabwe Airlink (ICAO code), a defunct airline

== Science and technology ==
- Field emission microscopy, an analytical technique to investigate molecular surface structures
- Finite element machine, a parallel computer project by NASA
- Finite element method, a numerical technique for partial differential equations
  - FEM Element, a commercial finite element method solver for electromagnetic structures from EEsof

== People ==
- Fem Belling (born 1978), Australian jazz vocalist and violinist
- Fem van Empel (born 2002), Dutch racing cyclist
- Ferdinand Marcos (1917-1989), sometimes abbreviated as FEM (Ferdinand E. Marcos)

== Other ==
- Femininity, having female characteristics
- Fem. ('feminine') as an abbreviation used in the context of grammatical gender

== See also ==
- Fem unga, a Swedish anthology published in 1929 and the name of the literary group formed by the writers
- Femme (disambiguation)
- Femke, a Dutch given name and diminutive of Fem
- De Fem, a Swedish spiritualistic group
- FESEM (field emission scanning electron microscopy)
