= Transfem (disambiguation) =

Transfem is the abbreviation of transfeminine, a transgender identity.

Transfem may also refer to:

- Transfeminism, a branch of feminism
- Transfemicide, a form of femicide targeted at trans women and travestis
- Transfeminine hormone therapy

== See also ==
- Trans (disambiguation)
- Fem (disambiguation)
