= Perforated metal =

Metal punched using CNC or laser technology

Perforated metal, also known as perforated sheet, perforated plate, or perforated screen, is sheet metal that has been manually or mechanically stamped or punched using CNC technology or in some cases laser cutting to create different holes sizes, shapes and patterns. Materials used to manufacture perforated metal sheets include stainless steel, cold rolled steel, galvanized steel, brass, aluminum, tinplate, copper, Monel, Inconel, titanium, plastic, and more.

The process of perforating metal sheets has been practiced for over 150 years. In the late 19th century, metal screens were used as an efficient means of separating coal. The first perforators were laborers who would manually punch individual holes into the metal sheet. This proved to be an inefficient and inconsistent method which led to the development of new techniques, such as perforating the metal with a series of needles arranged in a way that would create the desired hole pattern.

Modern day perforation methods involve the use of technology and machines. Common equipment used for the perforation of metal include rotary pinned perforation rollers, die and punch presses, and laser perforations.

Perforated metal is manufactured in two different ways. All-across presses and turret presses. All-across perforation is faster and more cost efficient but has the design limitation where the pattern is the same from row to row. Turret press manufacturing on the other hand can put any sized hole, in any location on the piece of metal. These presses typically also allow for dimpling where rubber tools strike the metal instead of punching the hole.

== Applications ==
Perforated metal has been utilized across a variety of industries including, but not limited to:

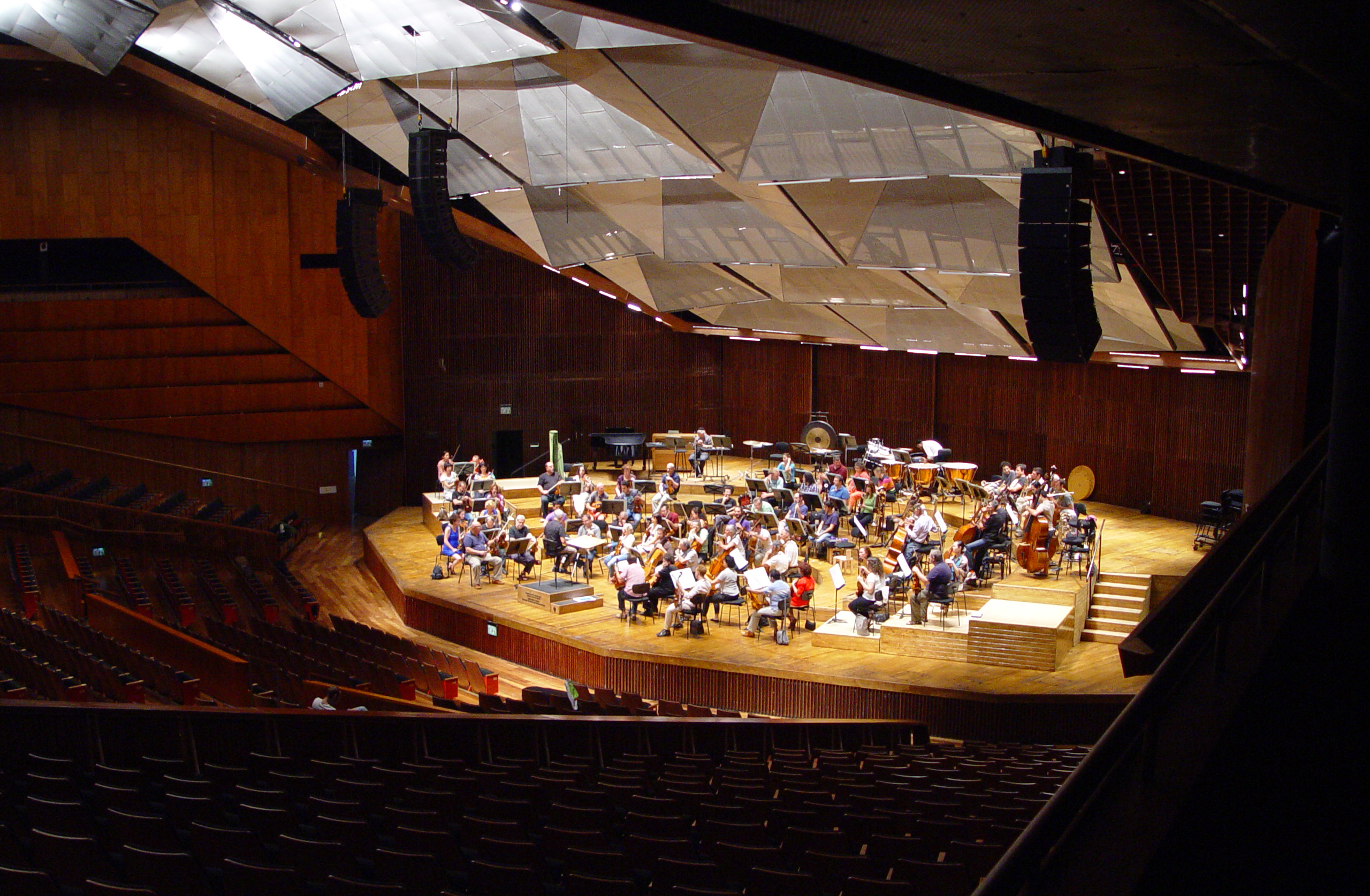
Ceiling of Culture Palace (Tel Aviv) concert hall is covered with perforated metal panels

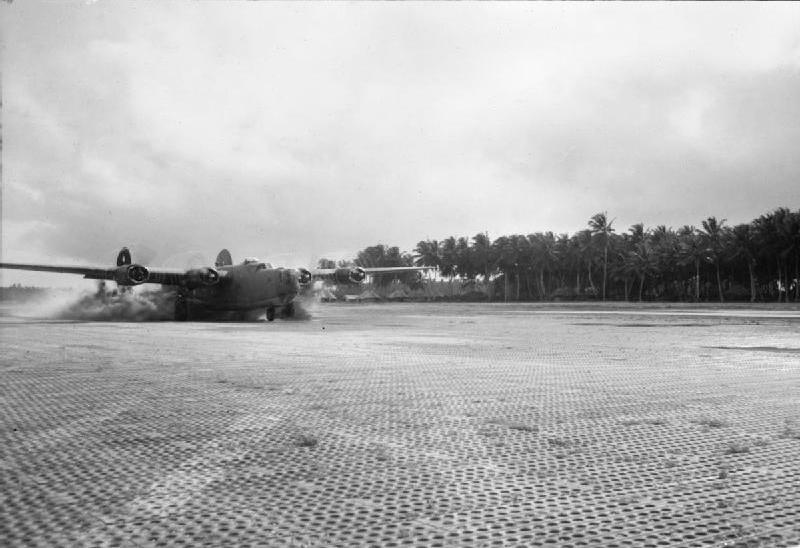
Perforated steel Marston Matting airfield

- Architectural - infill panels, sunshade, cladding, column covers, metal signage, site amenities, fencing screens, etc.
- Food & beverage - beehive construction, grain dryers, wine vats, fish farming, silo ventilation, sorting machines, fruit and vegetable juice presses, cheese molds, baking trays, coffee screens, etc.
- Chemical & energy - filters, centrifuges, drying machine baskets, battery separator plates, water screens, gas purifiers, liquid gas burning tubes, mine cages, coal washing, etc.
- Material development - glass reinforcement, cement slurry screens, dyeing machines, textile printers and felt mills, cinder screens, blast furnace screens, etc.
- Automotive - air filters, oil filters, silencer tubes, radiator grilles, running boards, flooring, motorcycle silencers, ventilation grids, tractor engine ventilation, sand ladders and mats, etc.
- Construction - ceiling noise protection, acoustic panels, stair treads, pipe guards, ventilation grilles, sun protection slats, facades, sign boards, temporary airfield surface, etc.

== Benefits ==
The acoustic performance of perforated metal helps people or workers to limit health effects from noise. Studies have shown that perforated metals help reduce sound levels.

Studies have shown that having buildings use perforated metal sheets in front of their façade can bring in one study 29% energy savings (HVAC + Lighting estimated consumption in 1 year) and in the second one 45% energy savings (heating, ventilation, air conditioning). Depending on the location of the building (intensity of the external sun), solar irradiation can be decrease by 77.9%.

== Architectural Benefits of Perforated Metal ==
Perforated metal is used in architectural metals because it allows architects to create light weight, durable surface that can have a range of textures and opacity. Panels are often break formed to enhance rigidity and build depth and allow for unique design features Perforated met

Image Generation in Perforated Metal

== See also ==
- Europerf, the European trade association for the metal perforation industry
