= Communion bench =

Feature of a church

A Communion bench is an adaptation of the chancel rail. Standing in front of this barrier, in a space called the chancel, or pectoral, the faithful were wont in early times to receive Holy Communion, the men taking the Consecrated Bread into their hands and the women receiving it on a white cloth, called the dominical, while deacons administered the Precious Blood which each took through a reed of gold or silver.

== History ==
Around the 12th century when the custom arose of receiving under one kind only, the priests placed the small Hosts on the tongues of the communicants at the chancel-rail. Later on, about the fifteenth century the practice was introduced of receiving Holy Communion kneeling, and so the altar-rail gradually came to assume a form better suited to that use, and like what it is at present (Bourassé, Dict. D'Arch. Paris, 1851). When large crowd approach the altar on special occasions so that the ordinary accommodation for receiving was not adequate, a row of prie-Dieu or benches provided with Communion cloths or cards, with a lighted candle at the end of each row, may be arranged around the chancel. (Cong. of Rites, Decr. 3086, Nov. ed.). After the Second Vatican Council, it became common again to receive the communion standing.

== See also ==
- Mourner's bench
