= HAWE Hydraulik =

German manufacturer of hydraulic systems

HAWE Hydraulik SE
- HAWE Hydraulik logo

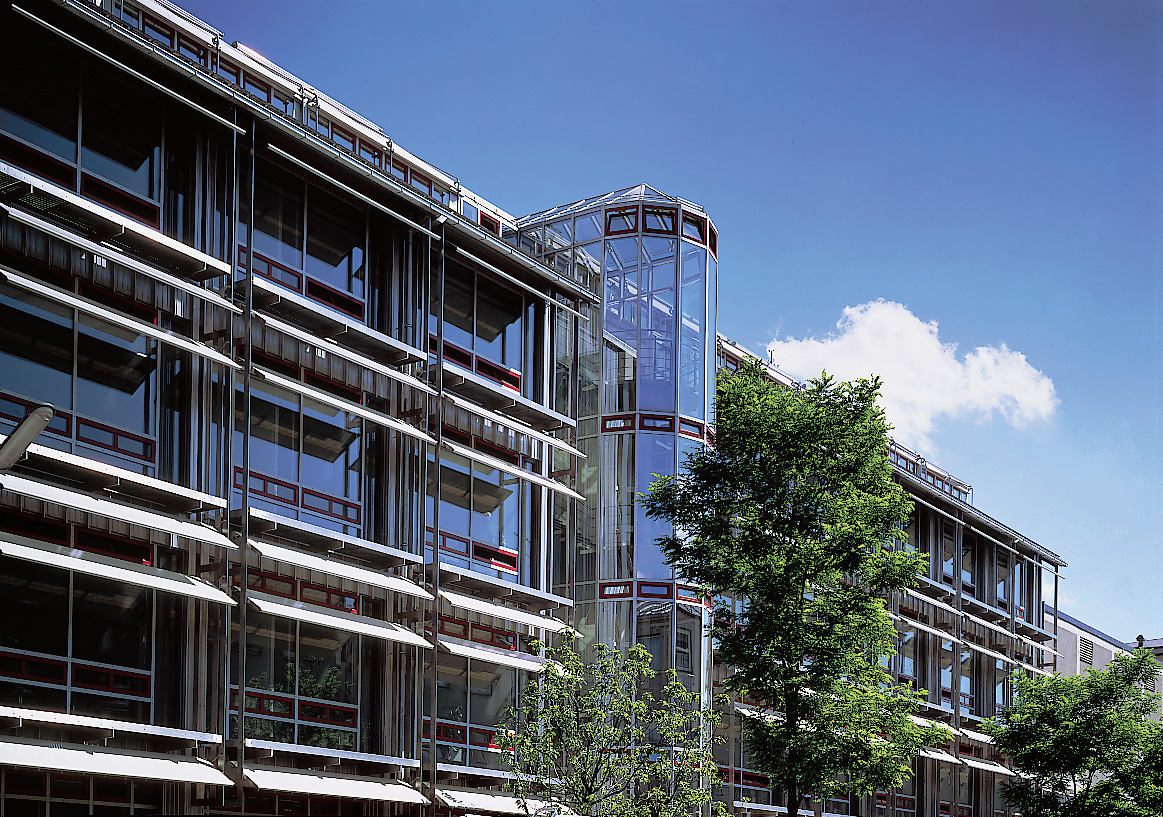
- HAWE Hydraulik SE Headquarters, Munich (2009)
- Founded: 1949 in Munich, Germany
- Founder: Karl Heilmeier, Wilhelm Weinlein
- Headquarters: Munich, Germany
- Area served: Worldwide
- Subsidiaries: Companies in Europe, North America and Asia
- Website: www.hawe.com

HAWE Hydraulik SE is a German worldwide manufacturer and supplier company of hydraulic components and systems.

== History ==
The company was founded as "Heilmeier & Weinlein" in Munich in 1949. The company was renamed as "Heilmeier & Weinlein Fabrik für Oelhydraulik" in 1960 and as "HAWE Hydraulik SE" in 2008.

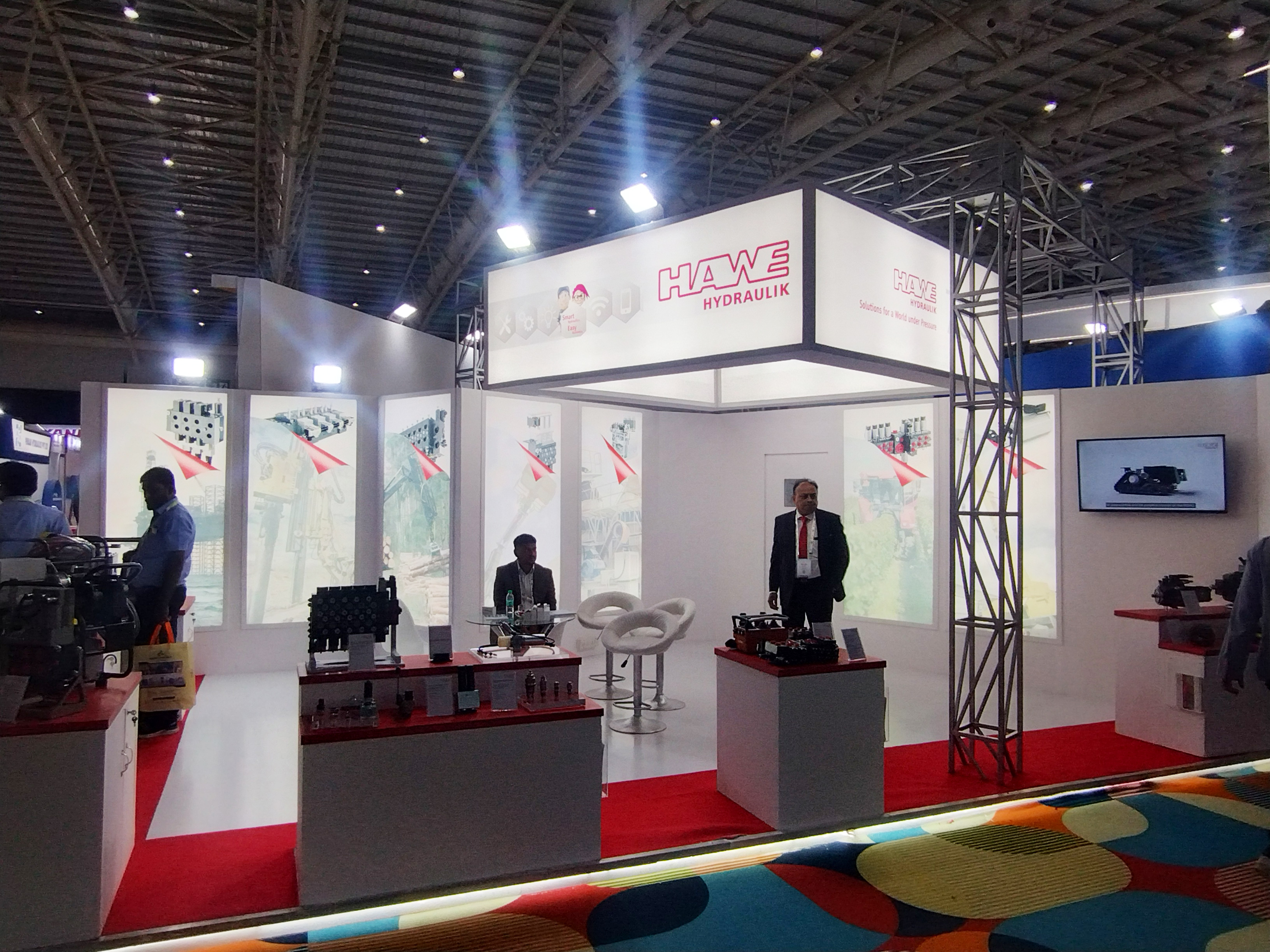
HAWE Hydraulik at EXCON 2025, BIEC

== Media gallery ==
HAWE Hydraulik products
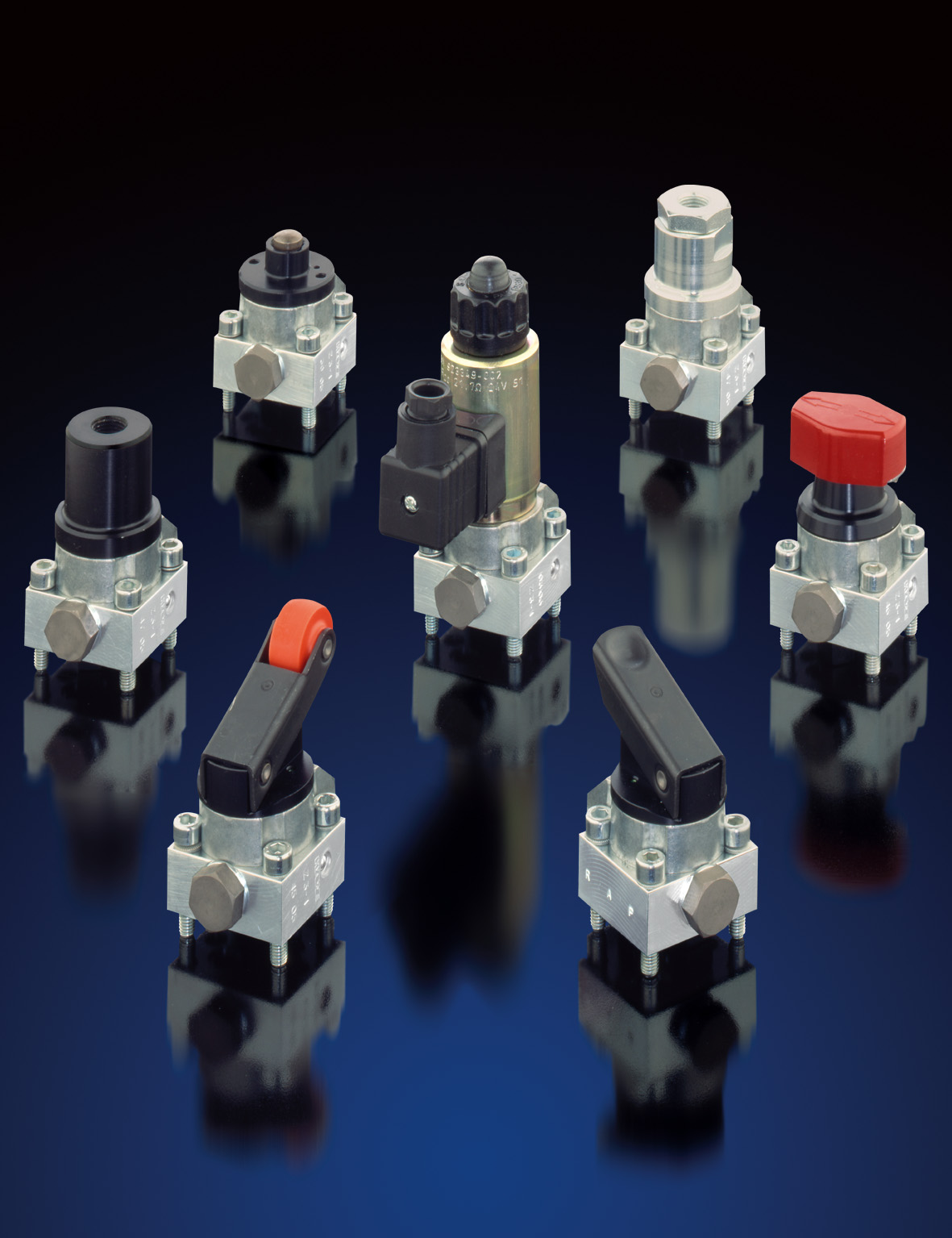

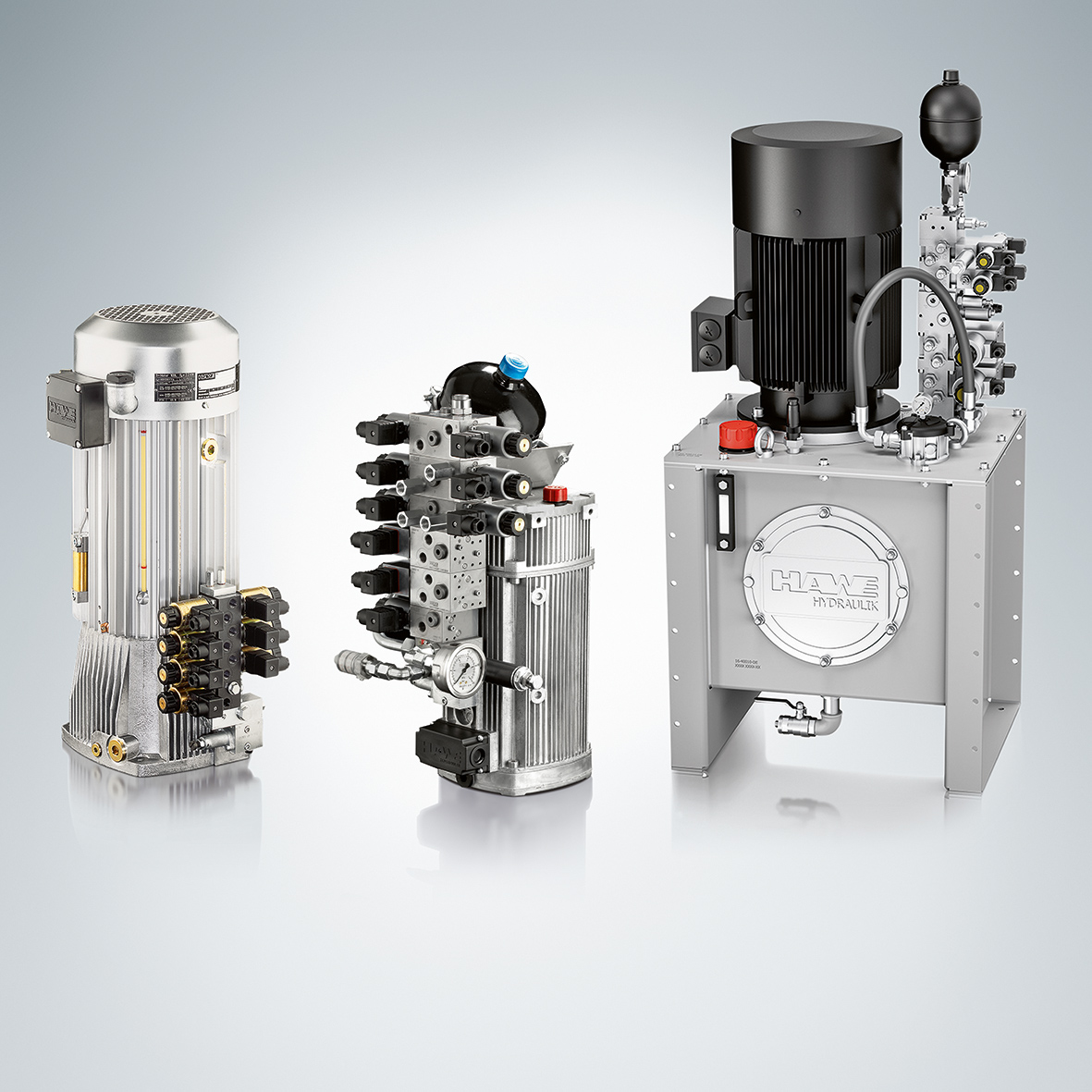

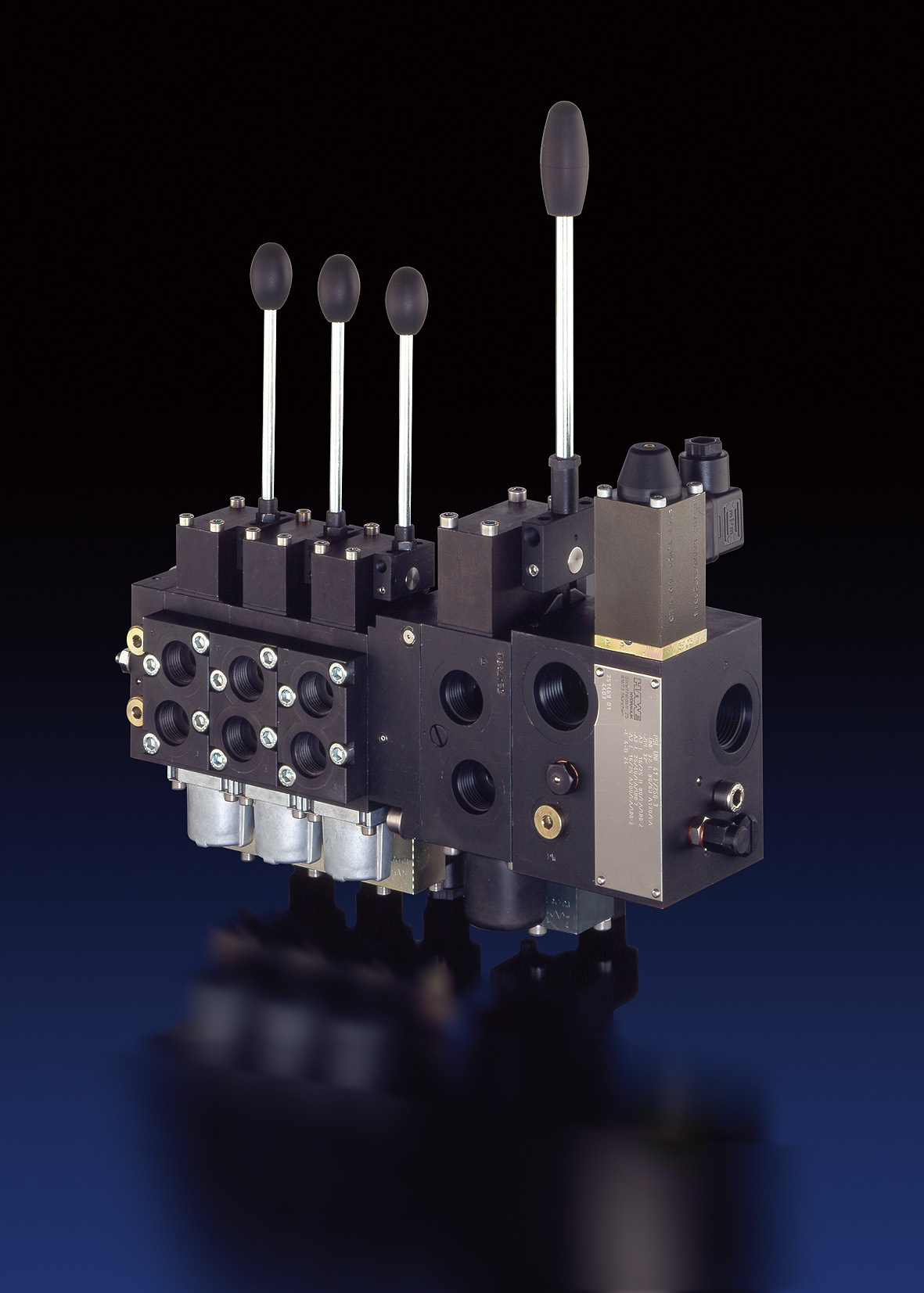
HAWE Hydraulik old logos
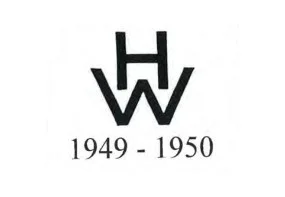

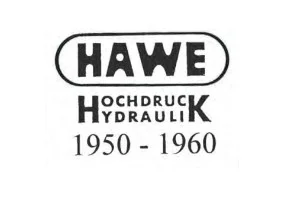

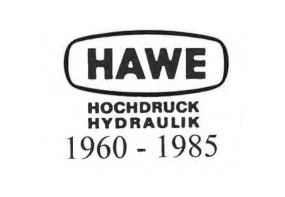

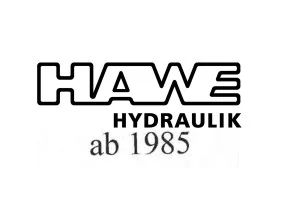
