= Groz-Beckert =

German manufacturing company

Groz-Beckert KG
- Type: Limited partnership
- Founded: 1852
- Headquarters: Albstadt, Baden-Wuerttemberg, Germany
- Key people: Eric Schöller (CEO), Markus Settegast, Kathrin Pross and Jan Jetter
- Revenue: 799 mil. EUR (Group)
- Number of employees: 8,823 (2025)
- Website: www.groz-beckert-group.com

Groz-Beckert headquartered in Albstadt in Baden-Württemberg, Germany, specializes in the development, manufacture and distribution of process-critical textile precision tools, industrial cutting solutions, textile reinforcements for the construction industry and composites. Founded in 1852, the company is still family-owned. In 2025, Groz-Beckert generated turnover of 799 million euros with around 8,800 employees worldwide. The company is active in more than 150 countries with agencies, production and sales subsidiaries. Groz-Beckert is the largest employer of the Zollernalbkreis.

== History ==
In 1852 Theodor Groz opened a store for toys and fashion accessories with an attached needle workshop in Ebingen, today part of Albstadt. In the same year he produced needles for warp knitting and hosiery production for the first time. In 1871 Ernst Beckert founded the identically named company "Ernst Beckert" in Eibenberg, near Chemnitz, for the production of needles. In 1884 Ernst Beckert relocated his needle factory to Chemnitz. Already by 1888 Theodor Groz & Söhne had founded their own health insurance fund for their employees – the precursor of today's BKK Groz-Beckert.

In 1937 the two companies merged, laying the foundation of the present group of companies. At that time, Walther Groz was the Head of the executive board of the company. Today, besides the headquarters there are further production sites all over the world (Germany, Belgium, Czech Republic, Portugal, India, China, Vietnam, USA). Also sales affiliates can be found around the globe (Germany, Czech Republic, Italy, France, Spain, Great Britain, Turkey, Mexico, USA, India, China, Vietnam, South Korea, Indonesia, Japan, Singapore, Bangladesh).

In fall 2013, Groz-Beckert founded solidian GmbH, which has since formed the Engineered Textiles business unit within the group. Solidian specializes in non-metallic reinforcements for sustainable construction. In 2014, solidian acquired Kelteks d.o.o., based in Karlovac, Croatia. Kelteks develops and produces technical textiles for the composites industry.

As a specialist for industrial cutting solutions, TKM GmbH has been expanding the group with its Cutting Tools business unit since October 2022.

From 1996 to 2018 the company was chaired by Dr. Thomas Lindner (* 1951), a descendant of one of the founders. From 2019 to 2026, he was Chairman of the Groz-Beckert Supervisory Board and, until 2026, a personally liable partner of Groz-Beckert. He was also President of the VDMA from 2010 to 2013.

Today, the Groz-Beckert Executive Board consists of four members: Eric Schöller (CEO), Markus Settegast, Kathrin Pross, and Jan Jetter. Since 2026, Prof. Dr. Staudigl has been Chairman of the Supervisory Board. Also since 2026, Dr. Peter Hamberger has been a personally liable partner and Deputy Chairman of the Supervisory Board.

== Products ==
The Groz-Beckert group comprises three business units. As companies, they operate independently and combine more than 120,000 product types.

Groz-Beckert is the world's leading supplier of industrial machine needles, precision parts and fine tools, as well as systems and services for the production and joining of textile fabrics. Its products and services support the fields of knitting, weaving, nonwovens, tufting, sewing and spinnning.

Also the brands "Eisbär by Groz-Beckert", Schmeing", "Knotex", and "Grob by Groz-Beckert" belong to the group. Today the following products are sold under the name of "Groz-Beckert":

- Knitting machine parts (knitting needles, system parts, cylinders, dials)
- Weaving machine parts (healds, heald frames, warp stop motions, drop wires, machines for weaving preparation)
- Parts for nonwoven production (products for the nonwovens-industry, felting and structuring needles, jet strips for hydroentanglement)
- Gauge parts tufting (tufting needles, loopers and tufting knives, reed finger modules)
- Products for carding process (card wires and clothings for the short staple and long staple spinning industry and for the nonwovens industry, mounting service, roller repair, commissioning service)
- Sewing machine parts (sewing machine needles, shoe machine needles, needles for domestic sewing machines, INH Quality Management)
- Further products (customized precision components (CPC), plastic products (SMG))

At the same time, the Groz-Beckert Group is tapping into the growth area of developing and manufacturing non-metallic reinforcement solutions and reinforcement systems for new construction and renovation with solidian. Reinforcement solutions made from high-performance technical fibers for composite materials are also offered under the Kelteks brand.

The industrial knife specialist TKM complements the group's product portfolio with industrial cutting solutions that are used in a variety of industries. The broad product range serves the paper, wood, metal, plastics, rubber, and recycling industries, as well as machine building.

== Research and development ==
In 2010 the company inaugurated its Technology and Development Center (TEZ) at its headquarters in Albstadt. Laboratories, a training center, development offices and seminar rooms as well as machinery for all important textile production processes are placed on an area of around 25,000 square meters.

== Social commitment ==
In September 2013 Groz-Beckert inaugurated its Health and Education Center (GEBIZ) at its headquarters in Albstadt. It is an expression of Groz-Beckert's commitment to its employees and their families, as well as to the region. GEBIZ comprises the following facilities: the private day care center and private elementary school, the TAF training and fitness center, the BKK Groz-Beckert company health insurance fund, and a public physiotherapy practice (Vitalzentrum Malesfelsen). In total, Groz-Beckert invested around 17.5 mil. Euro into this project.

== Weblinks ==
- Groz-Beckert Webseite
