= Buddy bench =

Playground seating

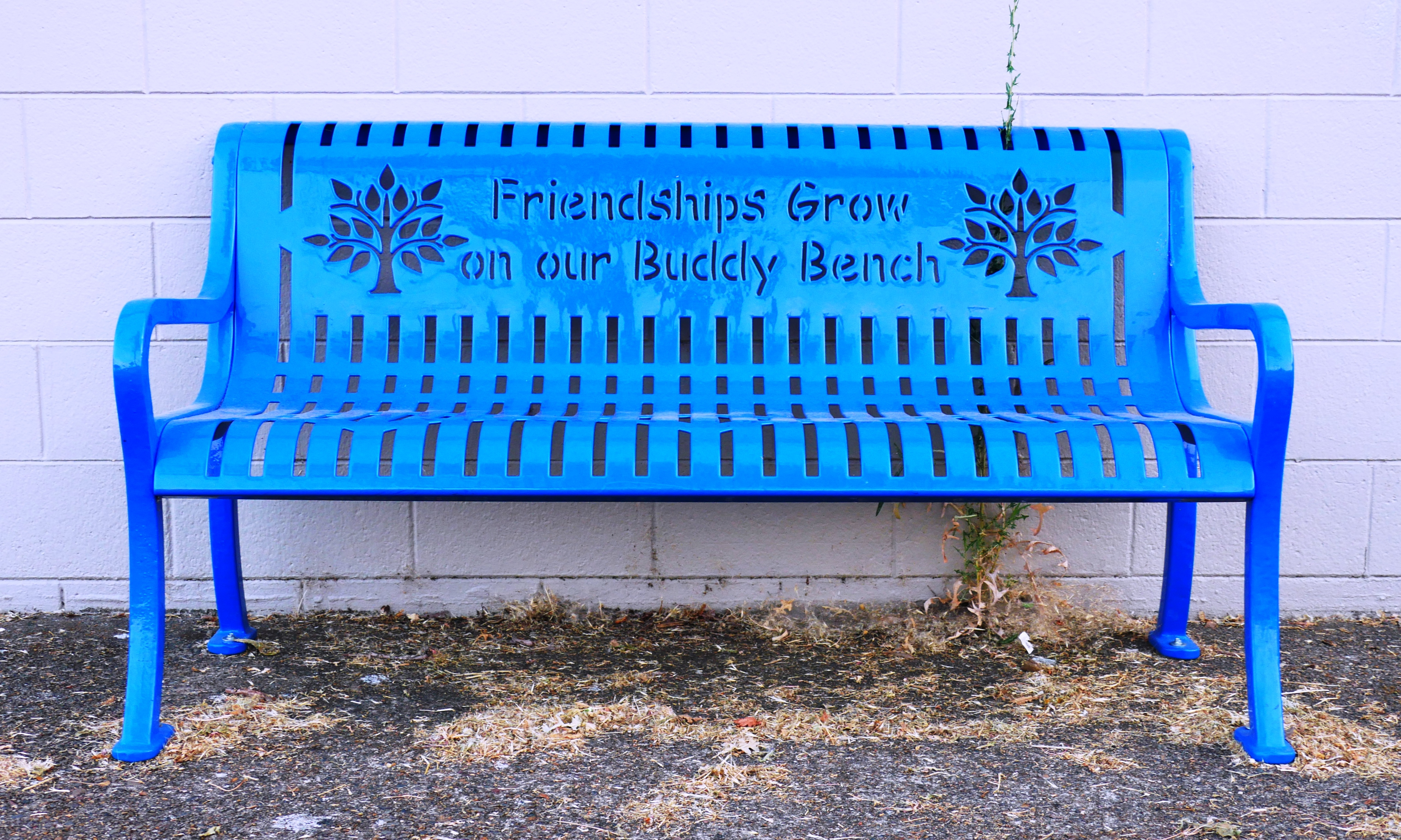
A buddy bench at McCornack Elementary School in Eugene, Oregon, USA

A buddy bench or friendship bench is a seat in a school playground where a child can go when they want someone to talk to. Buddy benches may be distinctively different from other seating in the school and may be specially designed by an artist or with the help of the children themselves. They are sometimes rainbow-colored. Such benches are situated in open and well-traveled areas of the school so that any child using the bench will be noticed quickly.

A child feeling the need for a friend to talk to can sit on the buddy bench. Other children and staff will recognize this as a sign that help, support or comfort is needed and will come to talk with the child.

The buddy bench is a means by which a child can seek support without the need to rationalize their feelings or to seek out a particular member of staff or special friend. Because the bench is in the day-to-day environment of the school it can be used at any time and for any reason—from seemingly trivial matters to more serious concerns—and encourages children to ask for help when they are troubled.

== See also ==
- Safe space
