= Pneurop =

- Formation: 1960
- Type: Trade association
- Legal status: Non-profit company
- Purpose: Compressed air products and vacuum pumps in Europe
- Headquarters: 80 Bd Reyers, 1030 Brussels, Belgium
- Region served: Europe
- Members: European compressed air companies
- President: Luc de Beul
- Website: Pneurop
- Remarks: General Secretary is Stéphanie UNY

PNEUROP is the European Association of manufacturers of compressors, vacuum pumps, pneumatic tools and allied equipment, represented by their national associations.

== History ==
The compressed air trade associations of France, Germany and the UK took the first steps to form a trade organization in 1958 and 1959. In 1960, more countries joined and it became PNEUROP, with founding members from Austria, Belgium, Denmark, France, Germany, Great Britain, Italy, Luxembourg, Sweden and Switzerland.

PNEUROP celebrated its formal 50th anniversary on 6 November 2008 by organizing a conference in Brussels with its programme and presentations by the different committees.

== Function ==
PNEUROP speaks on behalf of its members in European and international forums concerning the harmonisation of technical, normative and legislative developments in the field of compressors, vacuum pumps, pneumatic tools and allied equipment.

The association has been instrumental in developing recommendations for the compressor field since 1959, and cooperates with and contributes to several ISO committees including TC 112 (Vacuum Technology) and TC 118 (Compressor).

PNEUROP is committed to develop energy efficiency and environmental protection among its member organizations and members, as explained in an official statement. Pneurop supports the overall sustainable energy policy objectives of the European Union and its member companies actively promote energy efficiency as part of their daily business activity.

Pneurop is registered under the European Union 'Transparency Register' - ID number: 67236492080-88

== "Air Everywhere" ==
The PNEUROP General Assembly officially approved the launch of a project entitled "Pneurop Green Challenge 2020". Through this project, manufacturers, represented by their national associations, wish to draw attention to the importance of their equipment which is vital in reaching Europe's 2020 goals in terms of energy savings, development of renewable energy and a reduction in CO_{2} emissions. Compressors and vacuum pumps are used not only in projects for storage of CO_{2} but also in the manufacture of photovoltaic cells and in the transport and storage of hydrogen. These examples are part of the vast list of products and applications which professionals would like to make better known to the general public.

This determination to develop and promote these technologies of the future is the consequence of the industry's long-held commitment to reduce the environmental impact of the different production phases, to develop an ecologically sound approach to product design, and to encourage recycling of products.

Sustainability projects and low carbon initiatives need compressed air, gas and vacuum equipment. This is formalized under a signature and a logo "Air Everywhere".

== Ecodesign ==
Pneurop is an active stakeholder of the Ecodesign Preparatory Study on Electric motor systems/compressors (Ener Lot 31).

== Structure ==
PNEUROP's office is located in BluePoint in Brussels. The work is achieved through product network :

- Compressors
- Tools
- Vacuum technology
- Pressure equipment
- Air treatment
- Process compressors

PNEUROP is an international brand/trade name that was registered in 2007 with its logo.

=== Member organizations ===
- (Europe) Orgalime
- (Austria) FMMI
- (Belgium) Agoria
- Technology Industries of Finland
- (France) Profluid
- (Germany) VDMA - Compressors, Compressed Air and Vacuum Technology
- (Italy) ANIMA
- (Sweden) Teknikforetagen
- (Switzerland) Swissmem
- (Turkey) Association of Machine Manufacturers MÝB
- (United Kingdom) British Compressed Air Society Limited - BCAS
- ISO International Organization for Standardization ISO
