= Plumbing & Drainage Institute =

Association of American plumbing manufacturers

The Plumbing & Drainage Institute (PDI) is an association of American manufacturers of engineered plumbing drainage specialty products. Such products include floor drains, roof drains, sanitary floor drains, cleanouts, water hammer arresters, swimming pool drains, backwater valves, grease interceptors, fixture supports, and other drainage specialties. It is located in North Andover, Massachusetts.

== Purpose ==
The institute's objective is to promote the advancement of Engineered Plumbing Products through research and standardization of product requirements; to prepare, edit, and publish standards relating to plumbing products; and to provide certified testing, rating, and installation procedures for grease interceptors and water hammer arresters, in Standards PDI-G101 and PDI-WH201, respectively.

== Activities ==
PDI maintains testing equipment in independent testing laboratories for the purpose of testing Water Hammer Arresters for compliance with Standard PDI-WH201 and Grease Interceptors for compliance with Standard PDI-G101. Certified Products carry the Seal of the Plumbing & Drainage Institute as evidence that the product has met the specified requirements of the institute's standards. PDI assists with the development of National Standards through the ASME Committee of the American Society of Mechanical Engineers. This assistance is provided by members of the PDI Engineering Committee and by other PDI affiliates. PDI has been active on Panels 6, 14, 21, and 26, of the A-112 Committee for a number of years and its executive director sits on the A-112 Main Committee. This is the consensus group for ANSI (American National Standards Institute).

== See also ==
- National Sanitary Foundation
