= Comité Européen de l'Industrie de la Robinetterie =

European trade association

- Abbreviation: CEIR
- Formation: 1959
- Type: Trade association
- Legal status: Non-profit company
- Purpose: The Taps and valves industry in Europe
- Headquarters: Diamant Building
- Location: Boulevard Auguste Reyers 80, B-1030 Brussels
- Region served: Europe
- Members: 14 national trade associations
- President: Klaus Schneider
- Main organ: CEIR General Assembly
- Affiliations: Orgalime associate member
- Website: www.ceir.eu
- Remarks: secretary general is Stéphanie Uny

The Comité Européen de l'Industrie de la Robinetterie, mostly known as the CEIR or the European Association for the Taps and Valves Industry, is the European trade association for the taps and valves industry.

== History ==
It was formed in 1959. The taps and valves industry is currently worth €19 billion.

== Structure ==
Within the 13 member national trade associations it has 340 member companies - 95 for sanitary valves, 60 for building valves (gas, water and fire-fighting valves), and 185 in industrial valves (including valve actuators). It is located in the same building as Pneurop.

The European Association for the Valves and Taps industry is truly democratic, no national association can veto decisions. Like a true democracy and in a way that mirrors the European Union dynamic, the decisions at Board level are taken in consensus.

These industries cover products such as industrial valves, butterfly valves, valve actuators, relief valves, pressure-reducing valves, central heating thermostatic valves, taps and cocks.

The constituent organisations include:

- (Finland) The Federation of Finnish Technology Industries
- (France) Profluid - Association française des pompes et agitateurs, des compresseurs et de la robinetterie
- (Italy) AVR - Associazione italiana construttori valvole e rubinetteria
- AIMMAP - Associãcao dos Industrias Metalúrgicos, Metalomecãnicos e Afins de Portugal
- (Russia) Научно-Промышленная Ассоциация Арматуростроителей (NPAA) - Scientific & Industrial Valve Manufacturers Association
- (Spain) AGRIVAL - Asociación Nacional de Fabricantes de Griferia y Valvuleria
- (Sweden) Svensk Armaturindustri
- (Switzerland) URS - Verband Schweizerischer Armaturenfabriken (Union de Fabriques Suisses de Robinetterie)
- (Turkey) POMSAD - Türk Pompa ve Vana Sanayicileri Derneği (Turkish Pump & Valve Manufacturers' Association)
- (Ukraine) Ukrainian Association for Valves Industry
- (United Kingdom) The Bathroom Manufacturers Association

Besides the General Assembly and the Board, 3 Committees exist :

- Marketing & Communication Committee
- Sanitary Technical Committee
- Building & Industrial Valves Technical Committee

== Function ==
It holds its annual meeting in April or May. The 2012 meeting was held in May near Paris, in Chantilly. It was organised by Profluid, the French association The 2013 annual meeting will take place in Belgium in Ghent. The event will take place on 24 and 25 May. It is organised in a new way so that the 24 conference is open to any persons having an interest in taps and valves and not only members. This conference will be under the heading of innovation, high level speakers from the Ghent Vlerick business school, from Solvay, from Cefic, the trade association for the chemical industry and from FECS will address the audience.

== Dynamics ==
The European Association for the Taps and Valves industry has been very active since 2011. It changed its image with a new website, a newsletter, a corporate image and new designed slides. The association also changed its organisational structure to make it effective and best armed to deliver results.

== Technical works ==
CEIR's Sanitary Technical Committee is constituted of experts from main taps and showerheads manufacturers in Europe. Its main tasks are regulatory follow-up at European level, standardization follow-up and pre-normative works. It also represents taps and showerheads manufacturers' views and interests as CEIR is a registered stakeholder at the European Commission. CEIR is involved in the following topics:

- Construction products regulation
- Materials in contact with drinking water
- REACH regulation
- Water saving initiative and in particular the development of the European ecolabel for taps and showerheads

CEIR's Building & Industrial Valves Technical Committee deals with a great variety of topics. Applicable regulations are numerous and include:

- ATEX directive
- Construction products regulation
- Pressure Equipment Directive

Building and industrial valves are used in a complex normative framework, that the Technical Committee is in charge to follow, that includes CEN TC69 and ISO TC153 for industrial valves, CEN TC236 for gas valves and CEN TC164 for building valves.

== Water label ==
CEIR is heavily involved in the European water label. This voluntary labelling scheme was launched during the European Commission Green Week 2012. It enables consumers to make an informed choice when they buy taps, showerheads or control flow devices. Consumers can very easily and very quickly understand the water flow and thus consumption of the device.

CEIR will promote its Water Label during the ISH 2013 trade fair.

== See also ==
- Plumbing & Drainage Institute - USA
