= Machinery and Equipment Manufacturers Association =

Association of German and European Mechanical Engineering Companies

VDMA e.V.
- Verband Deutscher Maschinen- und Anlagenbau
- VDMA logo

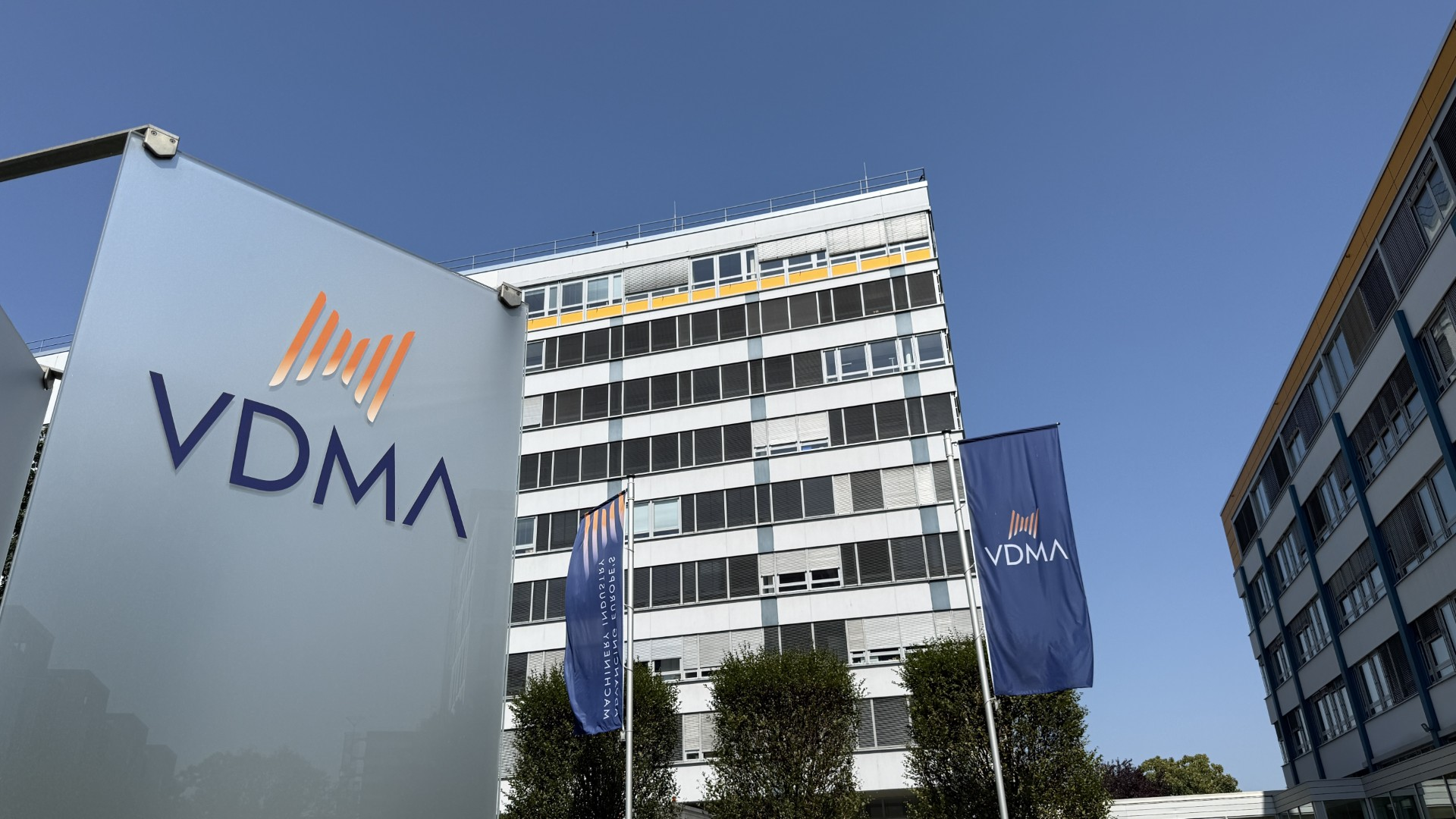
- Headquarters of the VDMA e.V. (2025)
- Abbreviation: VDMA
- Formation: 1892
- Purpose: Professional Society
- Region served: Germany
- Members: 3,600 (2025)
- President: Bertram Kawlath
- Website: www.vdma.eu

The VDMA e.V. (Machinery and Equipment Manufacturers Association), founded in 1892, is a German association of 3,600 German and European mechanical and plant engineering companies. The organized companies employ around 3 million people in the European Union (EU), and nearly 1 million in Germany alone.

== Core topics ==
The association divides its work and information offerings into 11 subject areas:

- Education & Modern Working: The association examines the transformation of workplace concepts, digitalized workplaces, and changing employee expectations in the mechanical engineering sector, with a focus on how companies and educational institutions can prepare for workforce changes
- Digitalization & Industry 4.0: This topic encompasses the digital transformation in mechanical engineering through internet of things, big data, artificial intelligence, and machine learning technologies.
- Research, Innovation & Technology: This area focuses on identifying technological developments and trends through analyses and joint research activities to support business opportunities in mechanical and plant engineering.
- Management & Business Strategies: This topic area provides support for member companies adapting to digital market changes through information on business issues, management trends, and strategic planning.
- Markets & Economy: This topic addresses market development, export regulations, and international business travel in the context of global value chains.
- Mobility: This area focuses on new drive technologies, alternative fuels, and transportation solutions, emphasizing opportunities for mechanical engineering in developing adapted business models and technologies for drive system transformation
- Sustainability & Energy: The association guides the mechanical engineering industry's role as supplier and user of climate-friendly energy technologies and sustainable energy systems, covering aspects from circular economy to climate-neutral production.
- Law: This practice area provides legal guidance for mechanical engineering companies on business transaction parameters.
- Tax: This topic offers guidance on diverse tax matters including German and international tax law, transfer pricing, and research tax incentives.
- Technical Regulations & Standards: This area facilitates economic cooperation and product marketing through technical regulations and standardization at national and international levels.
- Economic & Social Policy: This topic encompasses the VDMA's economic policy positions based on competition, individual responsibility, and open markets, calling for regulatory-based policies that create frameworks for investment and innovation. In addition, two standards committees are organized within the VDMA, as well as four subsidiaries

== Organization ==
VDMA is a registered association based in Frankfurt, Germany, and comprises six regional subsidiaries. In addition, there are three subdivisions outside Germany (Benelux, Italy, Austria). Outside Europe, the VDMS operates seven foreign offices. The VDMA also comprises 35 specialist associations. Member companies within these associations focus on specific industries, technologies, and topics. Two standards committees are located under the umbrella of the association, which also has four subsidiaries (legal form: GmbH).

The strategic positioning and operative leadership of VDMA are the responsibility of the Executive Directorate. The Association is headed by a Board of Chairmen comprising three elected company representatives. The President is elected every three years and cannot be re-elected. A Restricted Board and a Main Board with company representatives from mechanical and plant engineering act as advisory committees for the Board of Chairmen.

VDMA Board of Chairmen:

- Bertram Kawlath, President of VDMA, Schubert & Salzer Group, Ingolstadt
- Alexander Jakschik, Vice-President of VDMA, ULT AG, Löbau
- Verena Thies, Vice-President of VDMA, Thies GmbH & Co. KG, Coesfeld

VDMA Executive Directorate:

- Thilo Brodtmann, executive director of VDMA
- Hartmut Rauen, deputy executive director of VDMA

== History ==
=== 1892 - 1918 ===
The Verein deutscher Maschinenbau-Anstalten (VDMA) was founded in Cologne in 1892 with the objective of protecting the economic interests of all German mechanical engineering companies. It has its origin in the Verein Rheinisch-Westfälischer Maschinenbauanstalten, which was founded two years earlier and aimed to improve delivery and price conditions for mining and plant machinery in particular. Its first office was in Düsseldorf. At the beginning of 1914, the year in which World War I began, 246 companies were members of the VDMA. During the war, this number rose and stood at 814 at the end of 2018. During the war years also several trade associations joined VDMA, one of them being the Verein Deutscher Werkzeugmaschinenfabriken (German Machine Tool Builders’ Association, VDW), which joined in 1916. In fall 2018, the association's long-planned move from Cologne to Berlin was completed

=== 1918 - 1933 ===
The VDMA coped relatively well with the post-war years until 1923, despite challenging inflation and hyperinflation. Many more companies joined the association because they recognized how important it was to represent common interests During the Weimar Republic, more than 100 mechanical engineering trade associations were members of the VDMA. In order to pool their interests and coordinate internally, there were around a dozen trade association groups

=== 1933 - 1945 ===
In 1934, a year after the Nazis seized power, the new government adopted the “Gesetz zur Vorbereitung des organischen Aufbaus der deutschen Wirtschaft” (Law detailing the organic construction of the German economy). As part of this process, all business associations were united under one central management system and answerable to the Reich's Minister of Economic Affairs. VDMA became part of the newly founded the Wirtschaftsgruppe Maschinenbau (mechanical engineering economic group), membership of which was also compulsory for all companies that had not previously been part of an association. This group was led by Karl Lange, the executive director of VDMA The so called Anschluss (of Austria), the establishment of the Protectorate of Bohemia and Moravia, and the military conquest of Germany's neighboring countries from September 1939 onwards led to the integration of the mechanical engineering industries in these areas and countries into Germany's armament efforts, in which the Wirtschaftsgruppe Maschinenbau and Karl Lange played an important role In November 1943, an air raid destroyed the Wirtschaftsgruppe Maschinenbau buildings in Berlin, after which this industry group relocated to other cities.

=== 1945 - 1990 ===
In 1946, associations in the mechanical engineering sector were permitted to be founded in the British and American occupation zones (Bavaria, Greater Hesse and Württemberg-Baden) The Arbeitsgemeinschaft der Verbände der Deutscher Maschinenbau-Anstalten (working group of the associations of German mechanical engineering institutes, AVDMA) was the first supra-regional association to be founded, in 1947 In September 1949, the Machinery and Equipment Manufacturers Association (VDMA) was re-established in Königstein im Taunus The association's headquarters were located in Frankfurt.

Shortly after that – in 1950 – VDMA established a liaison office in the German capital, Bonn. A year later, the Gesellschaft zur Förderung des Maschinen- und Anlagenbaus mbH (society for the promotion of mechanical and plant engineering, GzF) and the Maschinenbau Verlag GmbH (later VDMA Verlag) were founded. The aim was to strengthen the association's public relations and communications work In 1954, VDMA took part in founding the Europe Liaison Group of the European Mechanical, Electrical, Electronic and Metalworking Industries (Orgalime)

In 1966, VDMA's headquarters moved to Niederrad, a district of Frankfurt A number of sub-organizations were founded over the following years: Forschungskuratorium Maschinenbau e.V. (research association for the mechanical engineering industry, FKM) in 1968, Dokumentation Maschinenbau e.V. (DOMA) and the Deutsche Maschinenbau-Institut (German mechanical engineering institute, DMI) now Maschinenbau-Institut GmbH (MBI) in 1972, the Fachinformationszentrum Technik (technology information center) in 1979

In 1980, the Association changed its German name from Verein Deutscher Maschinenbau-Anstalten to Verband Deutscher Maschinen- und Anlagenbau. The abbreviation, VDMA, remained the same During the next few years, political contacts were established and intensified on a national and international scale. For example, VDMA established a liaison office in Tokyo in 1984 because Japanese machine manufacturers had grown to become significant competitors to German manufacturers VDMA's Impuls Foundation was founded in 1989. It deals with tasks in the fields of science and research, the promotion of young talents, and international cooperation.

=== 1990 - 2025 ===
in 1998 the VDMA Gesellschaft für Forschung und Innovation mbH (society for research and innovation, VFI) was founded That same year, VDMA's Berlin office was inaugurated. In 2010, the VDMA launched its “Blue Competence” initiative, which aims to promote sustainability in mechanical and plant engineering. In 2024, the VDMA General Assembly decided to officially change the name: The new association name is VDMA e.V. In 2025 the VDMA launched a new brand design.

== Presidents ==
Verein Deutscher Maschinenbau-Anstalten

- 1892–1893 Hugo Jacobi, GHH, Sterkrade
- 1893–1910 Heinrich Lueg, Haniel & Lueg, Düsseldorf
- 1910–1915 Ernst Klein, Maschinenbau AG, vorm. Gebr. Klein, Dahlbruch
- 1915–1920 Kurt Sorge, Krupp Gruson, Magdeburg
- 1920–1923 Ernst Borsig, A. Borsig, Berlin
- 1923–1934 Wolfgang Reuter, Demag, Duisburg

Wirtschaftsgruppe Maschinenbau

- 1934–1945 Otto Sack, Rud. Sack, Leipzig

Wirtschaftsverband Maschinenbau Düsseldorf

- 1946–1949 Gerhard Wolff, Alexanderwerk, Remscheid

Wirtschaftsvereinigung Maschinenbau in Hessen

- 1946–1949 Alfred Mößner, Diskus-Werke, Frankfurt am Main

Vereinigung der Maschinenbau-Anstalten von Württemberg-Baden

- 1946–1949 Emil Möhrlin, E. Möhrlin, Stuttgart

Verein Bayerischer Maschinenbau-Anstalten e.V.

- 1946–1949 Everhard Bungartz, Bungartz, München

Verein Deutscher Maschinenbau-Anstalten e.V.

- 1949–1959 Gustav Möllenberg, Westfalia Dinnendahl Gröppel, Bochum
- 1959–1962 Max Knorr, Fortuna-Werke, Stuttgart
- 1962–1965 Bernhard Weiss, Siemag, Siegen
- 1965–1968 Walter Reiners, Schlafhorst, Mönchengladbach
- 1968–1971 Heinz zur Nieden, Ankerwerke, Bielefeld
- 1971–1974 Hugo Rupf, Voith, Heidenheim
- 1975–1977 Kurt Werner, Goebel, Darmstadt

Verband Deutscher Maschinen- und Anlagenbau e.V.

- 1978–1981 Bernhard Kapp, Kapp, Coburg
- 1981–1983 Tyll Necker, Hako, Bad Oldesloe
- 1984–1986 Otto H. Schiele, KSB, Frankenthal
- 1987–1989 Frank Paetzold, Schlafhorst, Mönchengladbach
- 1990–1992 Berthold Leibinger, Trumpf, Ditzingen
- 1993–1995 Jan Kleinewefers, Kleinewefers, Krefeld
- 1995–1998 Michael Rogowski, Voith, Heidenheim
- 1998–2001 Eberhard Reuther, Körber, Hamburg
- 2001–2004 Diether Klingelnberg, Klingelnberg, Hückeswagen
- 2004–2007 Dieter Brucklacher, Leitz, Oberkochen
- 2007–2010 Manfred Wittenstein, Wittenstein AG, Igersheim
- 2010–2013 Thomas Lindner, Groz-Beckert KG, Albstadt
- 2013-2016 Reinhold Festge, Haver & Boecker OHG, Oelde
- 2016 - 2020 Carl Martin Welcker, Alfred H. Schuette GmbH & Co. KG, Köln
- 2020 - 2024 Karl Haeusgen, HAWE Hydraulik, München
- since 2024 Bertram Kawlath, Schubert & Salzer Group, Ingolstadt

== Works cited ==
- Pohl, Hans; Markner, Johannes (1992). VDMA – 100 Jahre im Dienste des Maschinenbaus. Festschrift Band 1. Verbandsgeschichte und Zeitgeschichte [VDMA – 100 years of service to mechanical engineering. Commemorative publication, Volume 1. History of the association and contemporary history] (in German). Frankfurt am Main: MaschinenbauVerlag GmbH.
