= British Fluid Power Association =

UK trade industry representatives

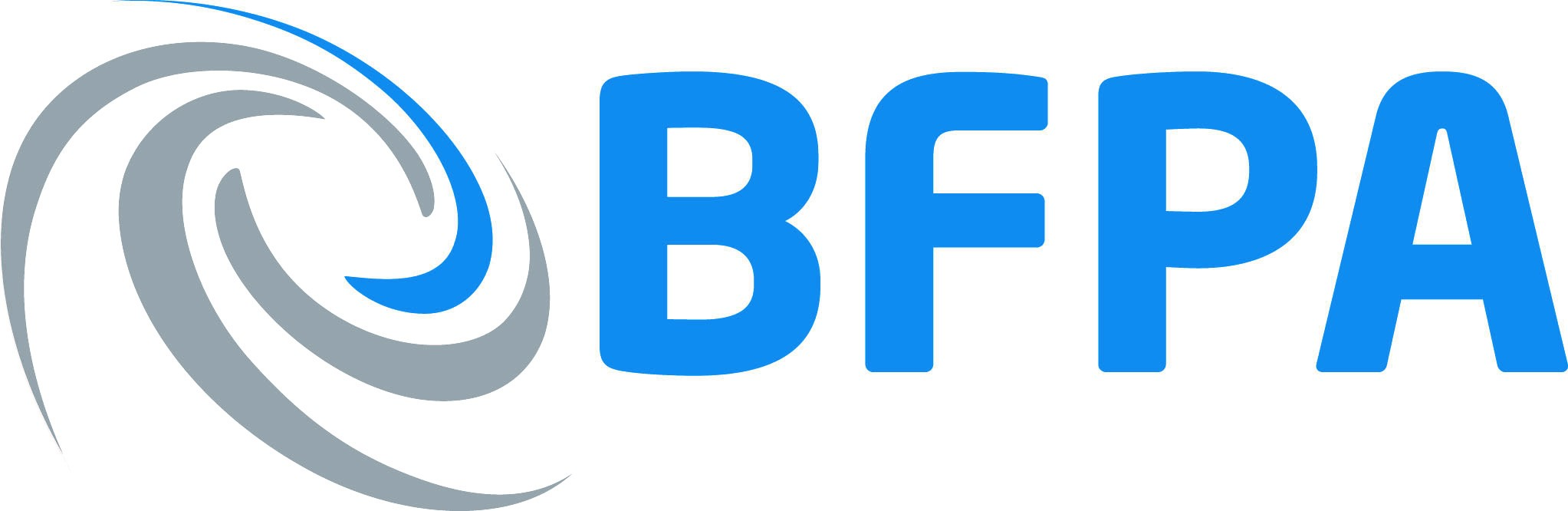
- British Fluid Power Association logo
- Abbreviation: BFPA
- Formation: 1959
- Legal status: Non-profit company
- Purpose: Hydraulic and pneumatic businesses in the United Kingdom
- Location: Cheriton House, Cromwell Park, Chipping Norton, Oxon, OX7 5SR
- Region served: UK
- Members: c. 220 including distribution and manufacturing companies
- President: J Serkumian
- Main organ: BFPA Executive Committee
- Affiliations: CETOP European Fluid Power (Comité Européen des Transmissions Oléohydrauliques et Pneumatiques)
- Website: BFPA

The British Fluid Power Association is a trade association in the United Kingdom that represents the hydraulic and pneumatic equipment industry, utilising properties of fluid power.

== History ==
It started in 1959 as AHEM, becoming BFPA in 1986. A division of the organisation, the British Fluid Power Distributors Association (BFPDA) was formed in 1989.

== Structure ==
It is based in Chipping Norton in Oxfordshire, just off the northern spur of the A44 in the north-east of the town. There are three types of membership: Full, Associate and Education.

== Function ==
It acts as a marketing organisation (mostly abroad) for the industry and collects industry-wide statistics. Its technical committees also help in implementation and origination of standards for the BSI Group.

It represents companies involved with:

- Electrohydraulics (e.g.power steering)
- Pneumatic controls
- Motion control
- Linear motion
- Hydraulic accumulators
- Hydraulic pumps and Hydraulic motors
- Valves
- Pneumatic and hydraulic cylinders
- Hydraulic seals
- Hose and fittings
- Marketing and industry statistical information

== See also ==
- National Fluid Power Association
- International Association of Hydraulic Engineering and Research
