= British Compressed Air Society =

British Compressed Air Society Ltd
- Abbreviation: BCAS
- Formation: 8 January 1930; 96 years ago
- Legal status: Non-profit company
- Purpose: Trade association for compressed air and vacuum equipment companies in the UK
- Headquarters: Rotherwick House, 3 Thomas More Street, London, E1W 1YZ
- Location(s): Tower Hill; London, E1
- Region served: United Kingdom
- Members: Compressed air businesses
- Executive Director: Vanda Jones
- Main organ: Board of Directors (President - Mark Ranger)
- Affiliations: Pneurop, BSI, ISO, CBI, Make Uk, EAMA, EURIS
- Website: www.bcas.org.uk

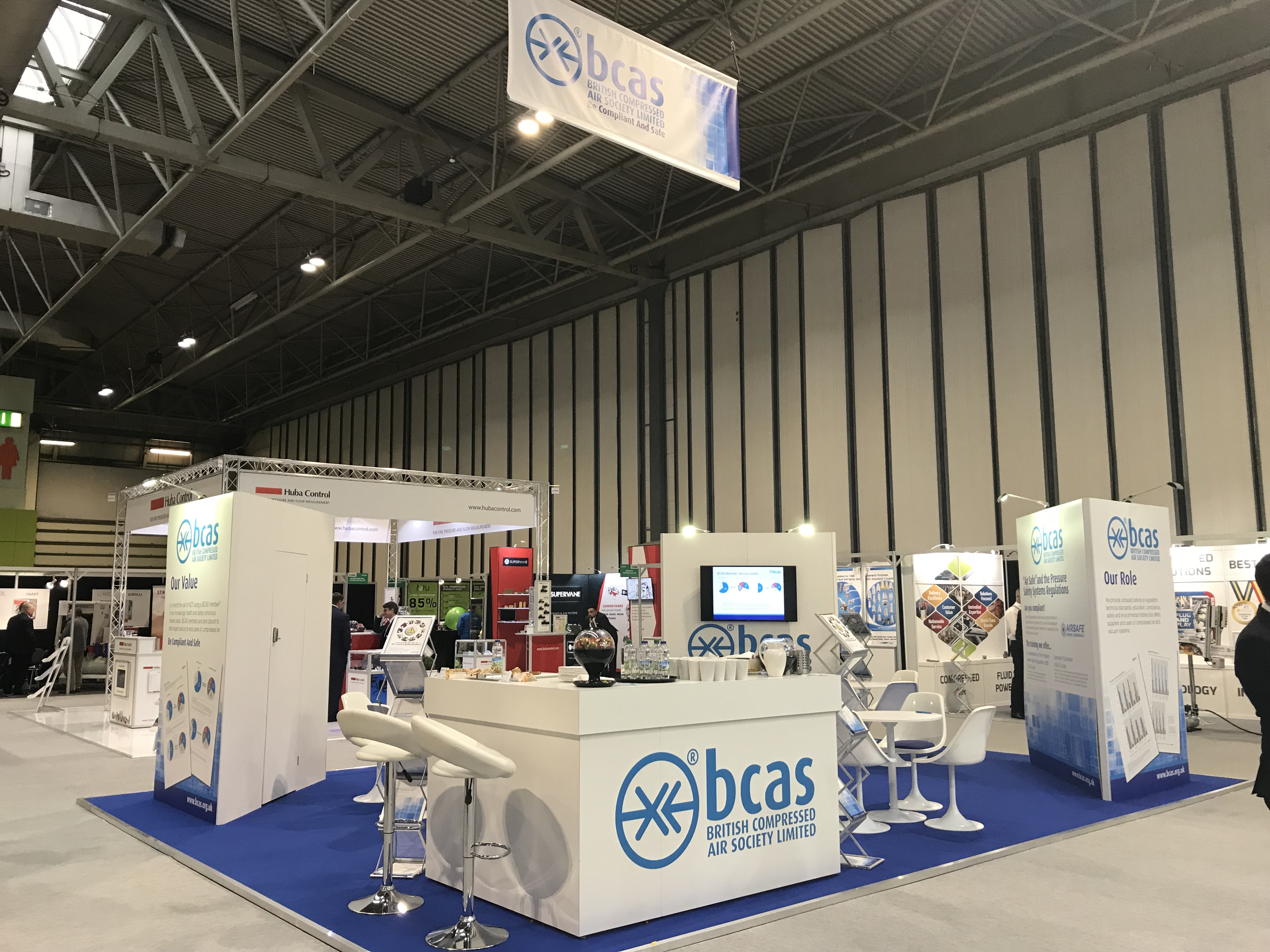
British Compressed Air Society at the Airtech exhibition

The British Compressed Air Society (BCAS) is the self appointed compressed air and vacuum trade association in the United Kingdom. It has membership for Manufacturers, Distributors, Suppliers and End-Users of compressed air equipment and systems.

== History ==
BCAS was formed in 1930 and represents manufacturers, distributors and users of compressed air and vacuum equipment. It became a company on 24 June 1998.

== Members ==
The organization is situated near to the Tower of London, at Rotherwick House.

Members include a diverse set of firms and organizations, including many of the following:

- Major Manufacturers & Importers based in the UK
- Major UK Distributors, Resellers and Suppliers

== Function ==
The BCAS plays a key role in setting standards and codes of practice within the industry. BCAS also lobbies the UK government on behalf of UK industry and business, e.g. to outlaw non-compliant products. It works with a range of organisations and government departments, including the Health and Safety Executive, standards agencies, and training initiatives.

It publishes statistical information on the state of the compressed air equipment UK market.

== See also ==
- British Fluid Power Association - similar organisation for hydraulic equipment
