= Orgalim =

European engineering industry trade association

- Organisme de Liaison des Industries Métalliques Européennes
- Formation: 1954; 72 years ago
- Founders: A number of European countries industry groups
- Type: Trade association
- Legal status: International Non-Profit Association in Belgium
- Purpose: Advocate for European engineering industries
- Location: Brussels, Belgium
- Region served: Europe
- Members: 35 trade federations (2018)
- Director General: Ulrich Adam (2025)
- Funding: Membership fees
- Website: orgalim.eu

Orgalim (derived originally from the French Organisme de Liaison des Industries Métalliques Européennes) is a European trade association represents Europe’s engineering and technology industries. It represent over 35 trade associations from 28 European countries that have over 770,000 member companies between them.

Orgalim is a European-level federation that engages with EU policymakers on behalf of its membership, speaking for 28 national industry associations and 20 European sector associations. Orgalim is registered under the European Union Transparency Register as part of European Union lobbying rules. – ID number: 20210641335-88.

== History ==
Orgalim was formally created in late 1954, therefore pre-dating the official European Union project. Founding associations came from Austria, Belgium, France, West Germany, Italy, the Netherlands, Switzerland, the UK, Sweden, Finland, Denmark and Norway. Meetings and informal collaboration between industries had begun in 1948, and although initially created as an informal club without any financial demands, the organisation became increasingly structured and eventually developed a secretariat in the early 1950s.

Various other engineering groups had been created at the same time as the European Coal and Steel Community developed, such as MEFTA and COLIME. Orgalim members decided in 1960 to incorporate the groups into Orgalim as working groups.

== Services ==
Orgalim's advocacy work addresses a broad spectrum of policy and regulatory issues from digital transformation and trade to Internal Market and environment policies.

As part of its service, Orgalim publishes legal publications to provide companies with contractual solutions for business-to-business relations – with use cases ranging from product supply, product installation, repair and maintenance, to agency contracts and distributor abroad contracts.

Orgalim is a member of the Alliance for a Competitive European Industry (ACEI) and the European Forum for Manufacturing (EFM).
